= Schoonebeek =

- Village
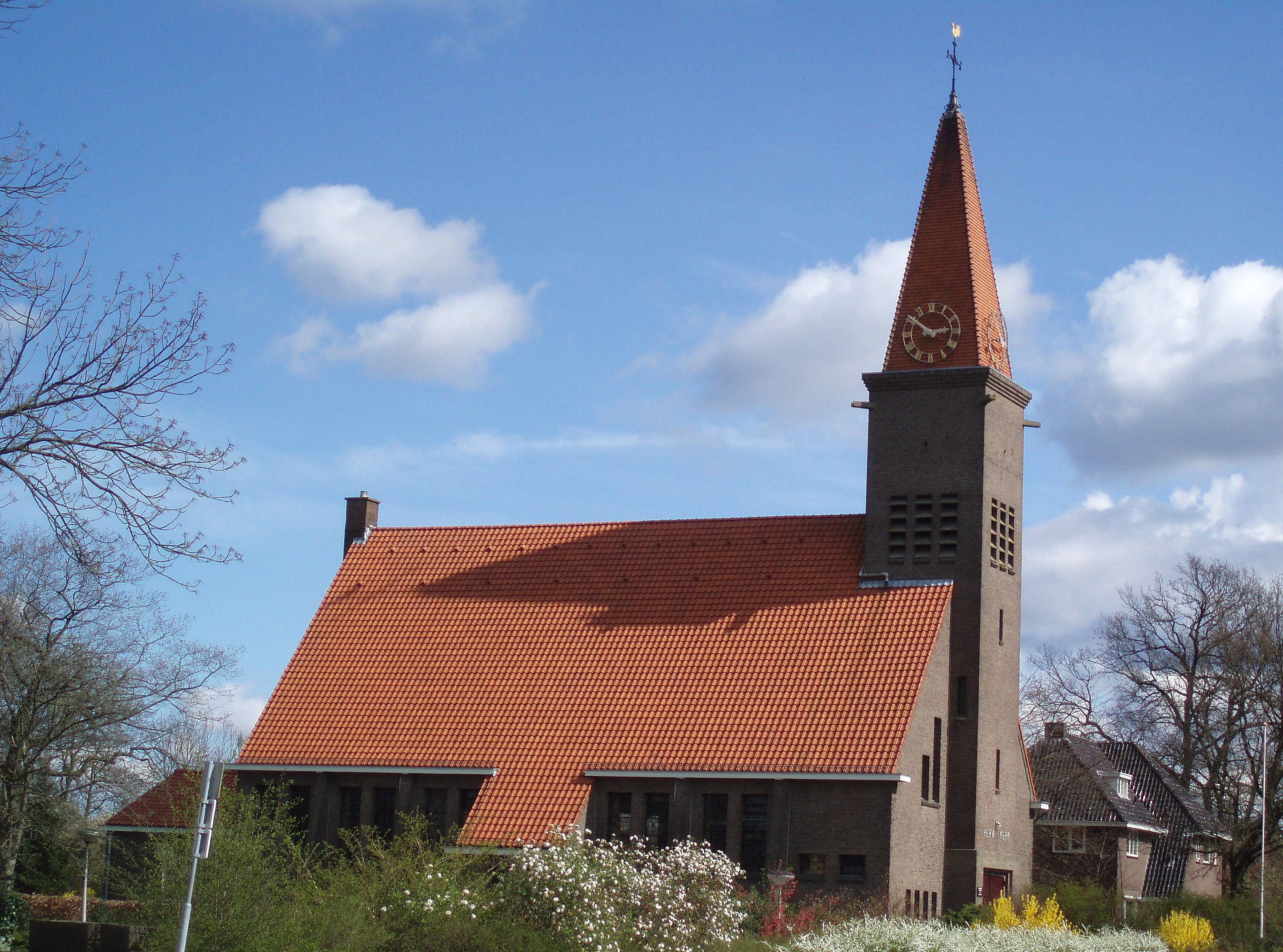
- Church in Schoonebeek

- Location in province of Drenthe in the Netherlands Schoonebeek (Netherlands)
- Coordinates: 52.6612°N 6.8801°E
- Country: Netherlands
- Province: Drenthe
- Municipality: Emmen

Area
  - Total: 26.49 km^{2} (10.23 sq mi)
- Elevation: 13 m (43 ft)

Population (2021)
  - Total: 4,865
  - Density: 183.7/km^{2} (475.7/sq mi)
- Postal code: 7761
- Dialing code: 0591

Schoonebeek is a village in the Dutch province of Drenthe. It is located in the municipality of Emmen, about 12 km (7 mi) south of that city. Schoonebeek was a separate municipality from 1884 to 1997, when it merged with Emmen. The area is home of the largest onshore oil field in Europe; known as the Schoonebeek oil field.

== History ==
Schoonebeek is a village which developed on a sandy ridge in the moorland. It was first mentioned in 1341 as "van Sconebeke" and means "brook with clean water". The Saint Nicolas Church was built in 1419, but was demolished in 1951. The economy of the village mainly depended on the exploitation of peat. In 1809, it became part of the municipality of Dalen. In 1840, it was home to 629 people.

Schoonebeek became an independent municipality in 1884. In 1943, oil was discovered in the neighbourhood of Schoonebeek. The population successfully sabotaged the wells which prevented the Germans from knowing how much oil was underneath the ground. After the war, pumpjacks became a feature of the landscape around the village. The discovery led to an increase in population, and the construction of new neighbourhoods. In 1998, it became part of the municipality of Emmen.

== Notable people ==
- Maruschka Detmers (born 1962), actress
- Erik Regtop (born 1968), footballer
- Albert Zwaveling (born 1927), surgeon specializing in oncology
- Jacquelien Scherpen (born 1966), mathematician specializing in control theory and rector magnificus of the University of Groningen

== Gallery ==
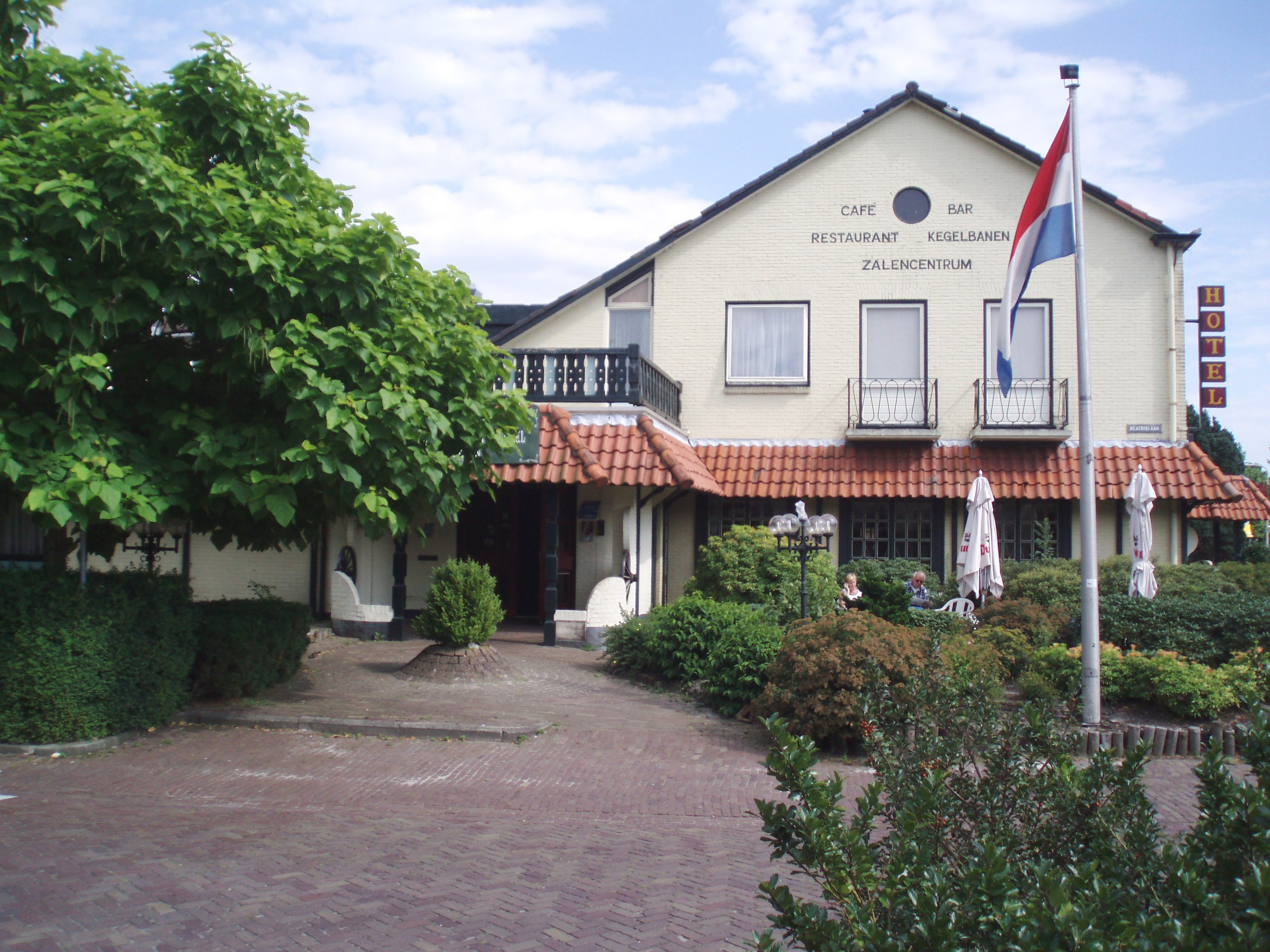
Wolfshoeve

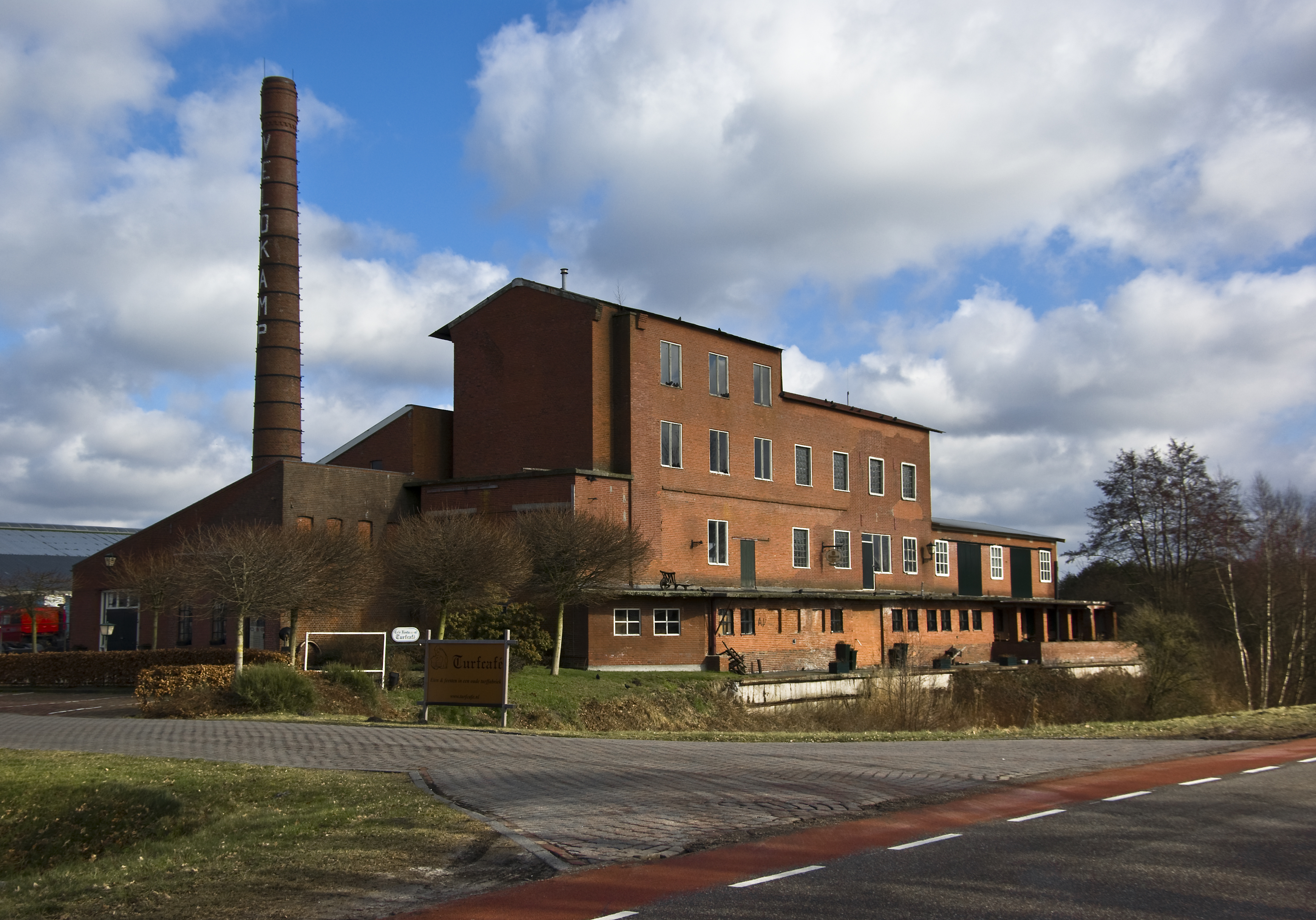
Peat factory

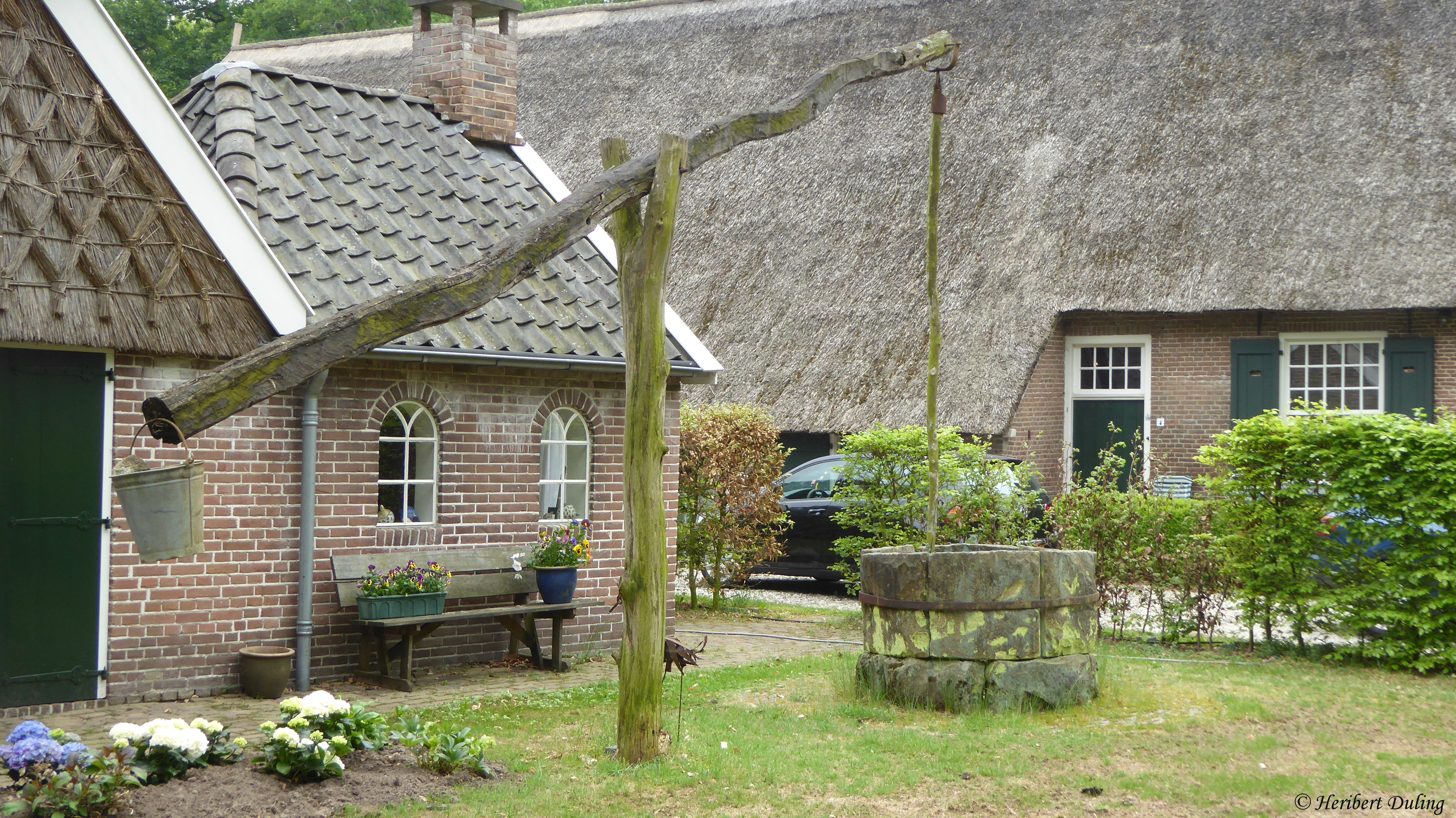
Farm with well

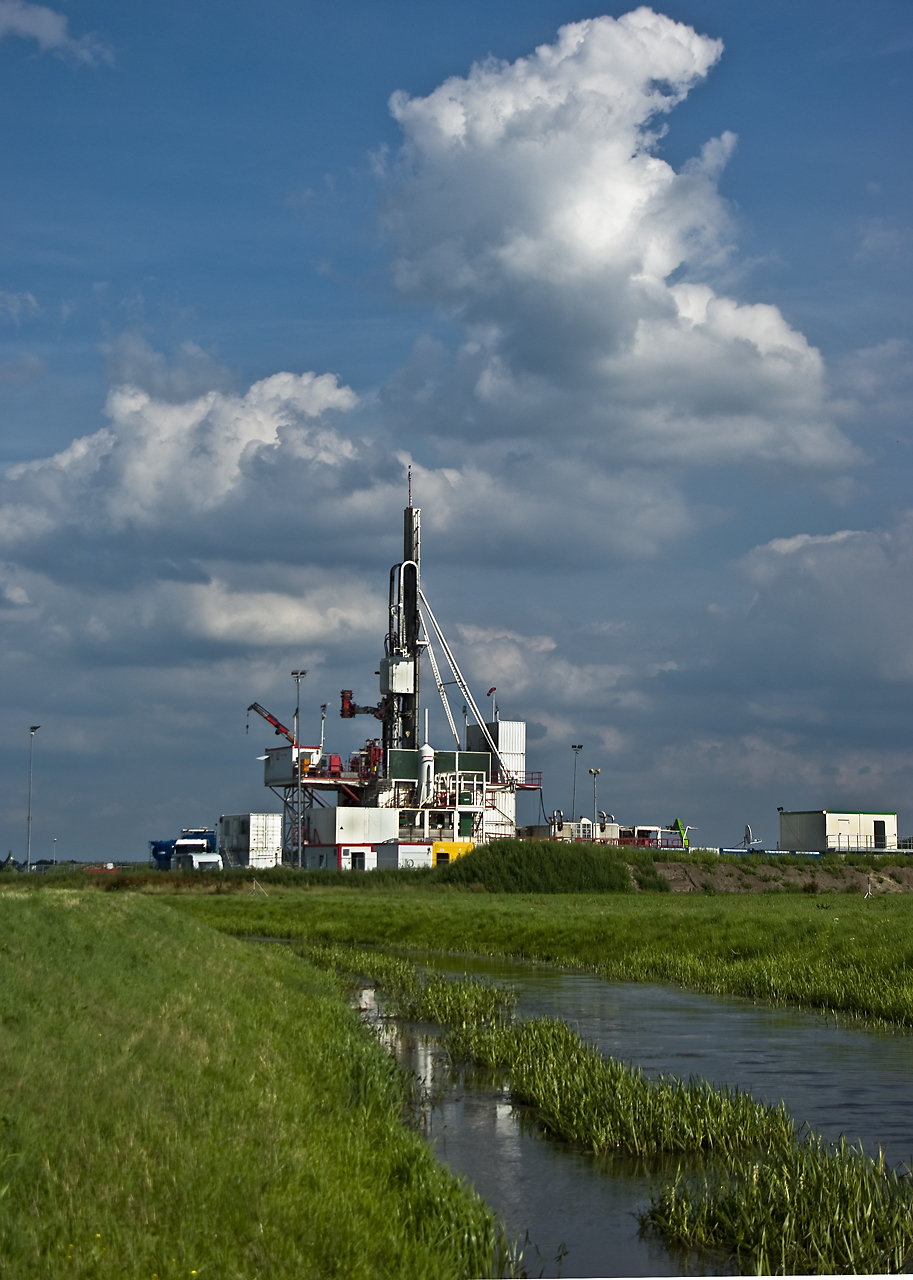
Drilling for oil
