= Sijbren Otto =

Dutch systems chemistry professor

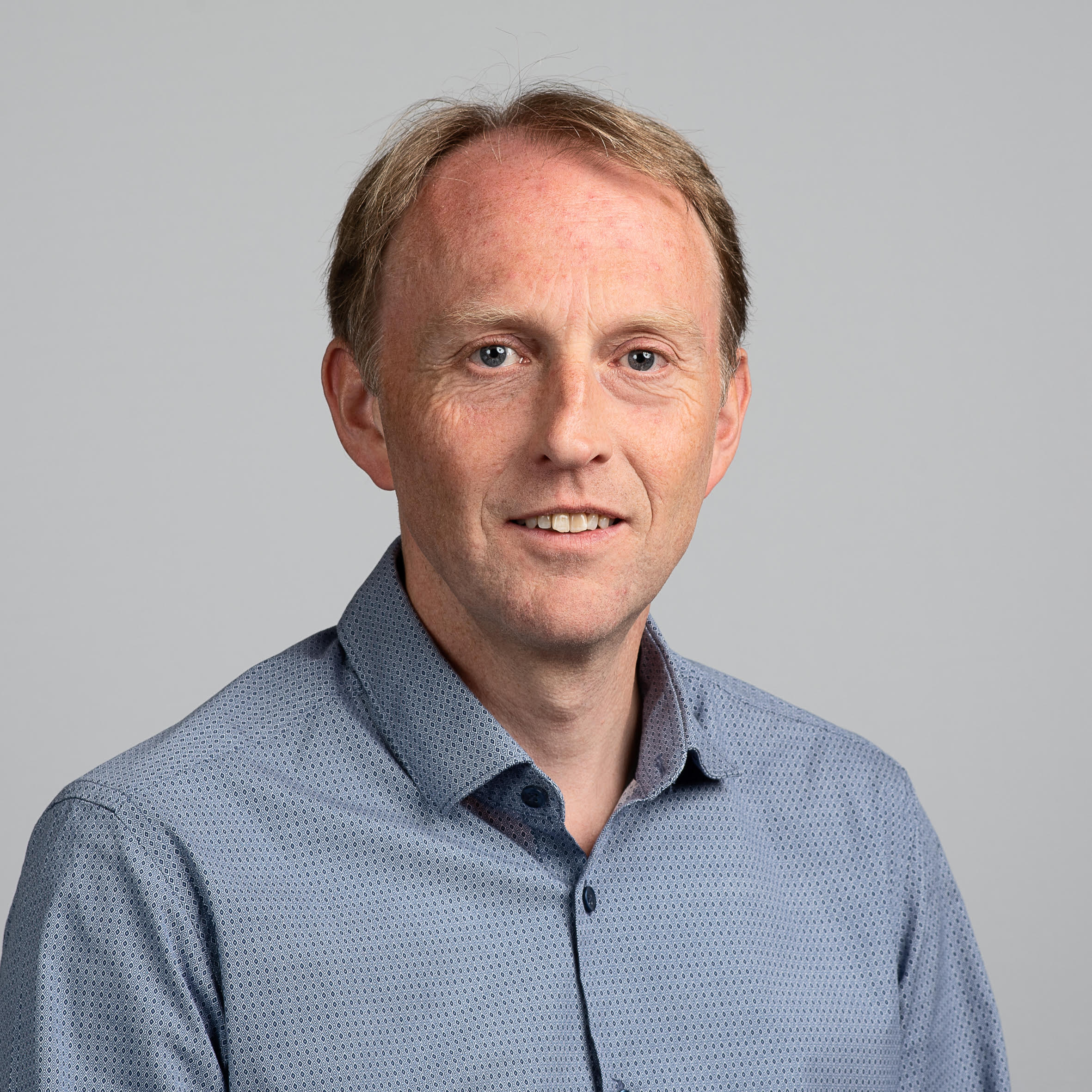
- Born: Sijbren Otto; 3 August 1971 (age 55); Groningen, Netherlands
- Education: University of Groningen
- Known for: Occurrence and making of life, development of new materials
- Awards: Supramolecular chemistry prize of the Royal Society of Chemistry. (2018)
- Scientific career
- Fields: Systems chemistry
- Workplaces: University of Groningen, 2009–present University of Cambridge, 2001–2009
- Thesis: Catalysis of Diels-Alder reactions in water (1998)
- Doctoral advisor: Prof. dr. Jan B.F.N. Engberts
- Website: www.otto-lab.com

Sybren Otto (Groningen, 3 August 1971) is Professor of Systems chemistry at the Stratingh Institute for Chemistry, University of Groningen.

== Career ==
Otto studied chemistry at the University of Groningen and in 1994, he received his Master's degree, focusing on physical organic chemistry and biochemistry, with the distinction cum laude. In 1998, he obtained his PhD, again with the distinction cum laude, from his supervisor Prof. Jan B.F.N. Engberts for his thesis entitled Catalysis of Diels-Alder reactions in water.

After his subsequent research in both the United States (in 1998, with Prof. Steven L. Regen) at Lehigh University and in the United Kingdom (first with Prof. Jeremy K.M. Sanders and then, from 2001 onwards, as a Royal Society University Research Fellow, both at the University of Cambridge), he was appointed assistant professor at the University of Groningen in 2009. In 2011, he was promoted to associate professor and in 2016, to full professor. From 2014 to 2019, he coordinated the master's degree programme in chemistry.

Alongside his work at the university, Otto is also one of the six principal investigators of the Dutch national gravity programme for functional molecular systems (FMS; €26 million, over 10 years, 2013–2023). The ambition of this programme is to gain control over molecular self-assembly. With this technology, nanomotors could be made, for example, or biomaterials to repair damaged bodily tissues. Otto was the lead applicant and chair of the European Cooperation in Science & Technology (COST) Action CM1304 (Emergence and Evolution of Complex Chemical Systems), which united more than 95 European research groups. He is the chair of the Gordon Research Conference on Systems Chemistry 2020 and is editor-in-chief of the Journal of Systems Chemistry.

Otto is a member of the Royal Dutch Chemical Society (KNCV), fellow of the Royal Society of Chemistry and member of the American Chemical Society. He is member of the steering committee of the Origins Center. The Origins Center is a Dutch research platform for scientists who are involved in the key questions of the Dutch Research Agenda on the origin, evolution and future of life on Earth and in the universe. Otto is active on several fronts in both the Netherlands and abroad. Otto was elected a member of the Royal Netherlands Academy of Arts and Sciences in 2020.

== Research ==
The research conducted by Otto and his research group is focused on various fields, varying from the origin of life (self-replicating systems and the Darwinian evolution thereof), to materials chemistry (self-synthesizing fibres, hydrogels and nanoparticle surfaces).

Specific interests include self-replicating molecules, foldamers, catalysis, molecular recognition of biomolecules and self-synthesizing materials (materials of which their self-assembly drives the synthesis of the molecules that assemble). The complex chemical mixtures that are designed, made and researched often display new properties that are relevant to understanding how new traits are able to arise in nature. The final goal of all of this research is the de novo synthesis of new forms of life via the integration of self-replicating systems with metabolism and compartmentalization. His 114 publications have been cited a total of 8,873 times by other scientists. His h-index is 51.

== Grants and prizes ==
- 1999 Marie Curie Fellowship, University of Cambridge, United Kingdom.
- 2000 Junior Research Fellowship, Wolfson College, Cambridge, United Kingdom.
- 2001 Royal Society University Research Fellowship, University of Cambridge, United Kingdom.
- 2011 ERC Starting Grant (subsidy) from the European Research Council for research into: Self-replication in dynamic molecular networks
- 2013 Vici grant from the Dutch Research Council (NWO) for research into: the Darwinian evolution of molecules. (Vici grants are intended for excellent senior researchers who can demonstrably develop their own innovative research lines and who are suitable for coaching early-career researchers.
- 2013 Appointed as Fellow of the Royal Society of Chemistry.
- 2013 Visiting professor, University of Strasbourg, France.
- 2017 ERC Advanced Grant (subsidy) from the European Research Council.
- 2018 Visiting professor, LMU Munich, Germany.
- 2018 Supramolecular chemistry prize of the Royal Society of Chemistry.
- 2020 Member of the Royal Dutch Academy of Science (link).
- 2023 ERC Synergy Grant (subsidy) from the European Research Council.
