= Scherpen =

Scherpen is a surname. Notable people with the surname include:

- Jacquelien Scherpen, Dutch applied mathematician
- Kjell Scherpen (born 2000), Dutch footballer
- Martijn Scherpen (born 1988), Dutch bicycle motocross competitor
- Uwe Scherpen (born 1963), German badminton player
