= Stratingh Institute for Chemistry =

Dutch research institute

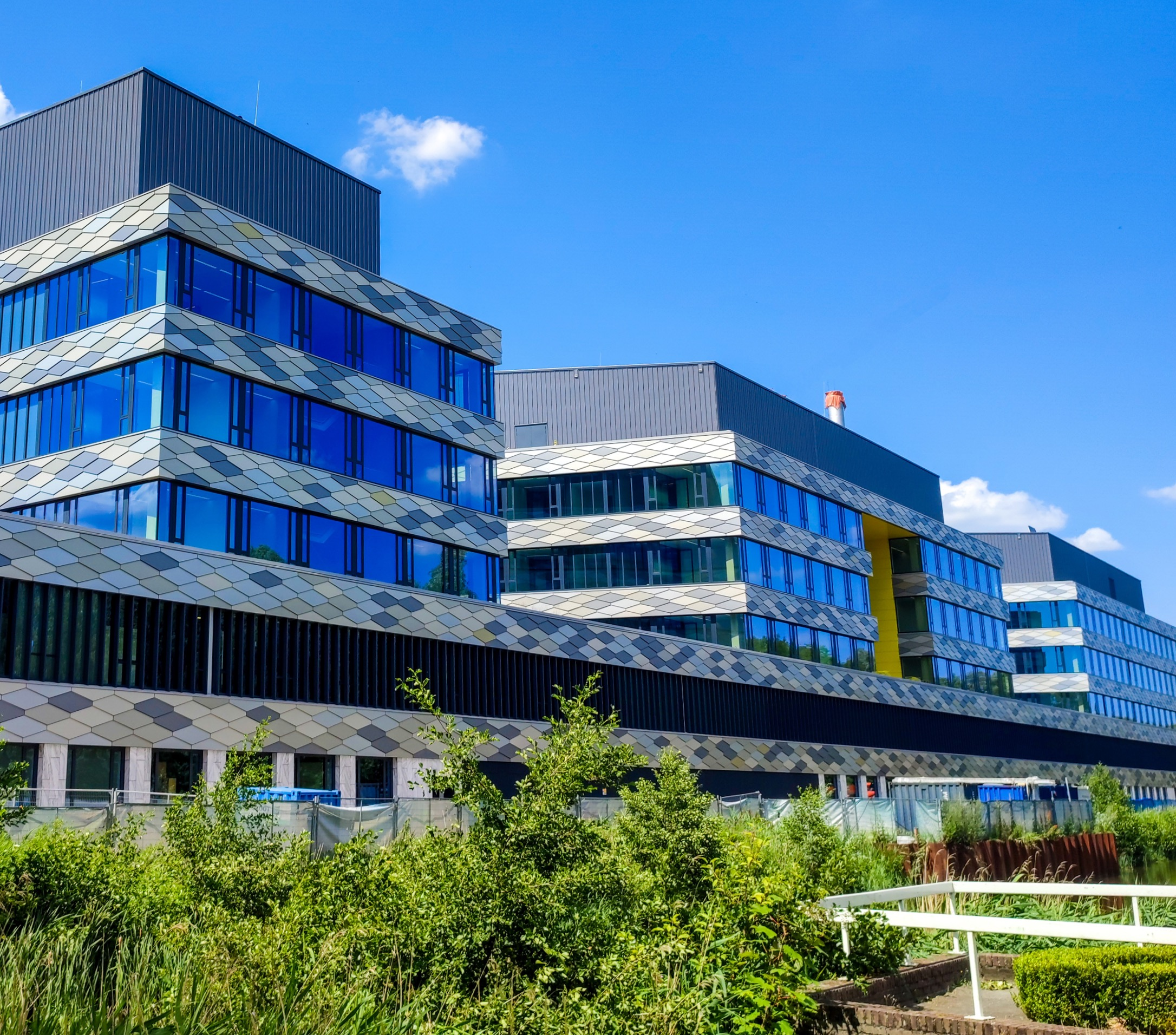
- Feringa Building
- Research type: Chemistry
- Field of research: Organic Chemistry; Catalysis; Inorganic Chemistry; Supramolecular Chemistry; Chemical biology; Materials Chemistry; Systems Chemistry
- Director: Prof. Gerard Roelfes
- Staff: 150
- Location: Zernike Campus, Nijenborgh 3 & Nijenborgh 7, Groningen, The Netherlands, Groningen, The Netherlands; 53.239°N 6.540°E
- Website: www.rug.nl/research/stratingh/

The Stratingh Institute for Chemistry is a research institute of the Faculty of Science and Engineering of the University of Groningen (The Netherlands). It is named after Sibrandus Stratingh, who is known for being the inventor of the first battery powered electric car. As of 2020, about 150 people (from over 30 nationalities) are employed within the Stratingh Institute for Chemistry. The staff members include Ben Feringa, who won the 2016 Nobel Prize in Chemistry "for the design and synthesis of molecular machines", Nathalie Katsonis and Sijbren Otto. The institute is currently located on the Zernike Campus in Groningen, in the Feringa Building and Linnaeusborg.

== Research topics ==
The research carried out within the institute falls within the following research areas:

- chemistry of life: the study of biological phenomena and medicinally relevant problems from a molecular perspective. This comprises the chemical synthesis of complex natural products, the design and synthesis of small molecules to study and steer biochemical processes, and steps towards the creation of new life (mimicking abiogenesis).
- chemical conversion: the development and synthesis of new catalysts. This includes asymmetric catalysis and catalytic oxidation, designing (artificial) enzymes, the use of bio-based raw material and development of sustainable processes, and homogeneous catalysis methods using earth-abundant metals.
- chemistry of materials: the development of molecular switches and motors, photovoltaics, functional polymers, molecular electronics, supramolecular materials, functional surfaces and synthetic membrane.
