= University of Groningen =

Public university in Groningen, the Netherlands

University of Groningen (UG)
- Rijksuniversiteit Groningen (RUG)
- Latin: Academia Groningana
- Motto: Verbum Domini Lucerna Pedibus Nostris (Latin)
- Motto in English: The word of the Lord is a light for our feet
- Type: Public research university
- Established: 1614; 412 years ago
- Affiliations: Coimbra Group; Guild of European Research-Intensive Universities
- President: Jouke de Vries
- Rector: Jacquelien Scherpen
- Academic staff: 7,200 employees (in 2025)
- Administrative staff: 7,200 employees (2025)
- Students: 33,000 (in 2025)
- Doctoral students: 4,600 (in 2024)
- Location: Groningen, Netherlands; 53°13′9″N 6°33′46″E
- Colours: UG Red, White & Black
- Website: www.rug.nl

The University of Groningen (abbreviated as UG; Dutch: Rijksuniversiteit Groningen, abbreviated as RUG) is a public research university of more than 30,000 students in the city of Groningen, Netherlands. Founded in 1614, the university is the second oldest in the country (after Leiden).

The University of Groningen has eleven faculties, nine graduate schools, 27 research centres and institutes, and more than 175-degree programmes. The university's alumni and faculty include Johann Bernoulli, Aletta Jacobs, four Nobel Prize winners, nine Spinoza Prize winners, one Stevin Prize winner, various members of the Dutch royal family, several politicians, the first president of the European Central Bank, and a secretary general of NATO.

== History ==
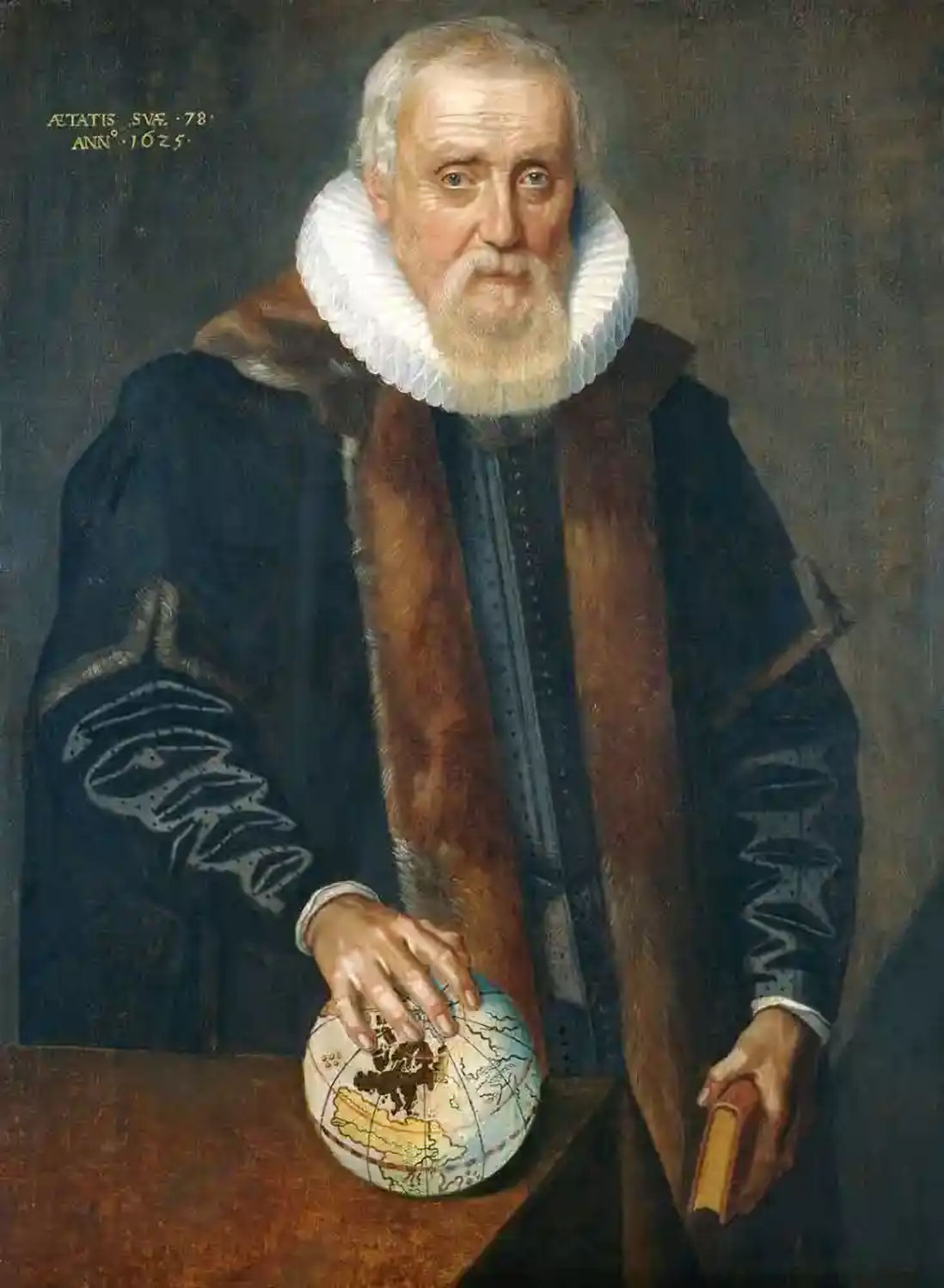
Ubbo Emmius was the first rector magnificus of the University of Groningen.

The institution was founded as a college in 1614 in an initiative taken by the Regional Assembly of the city of Groningen and the Ommelanden, or surrounding region. There were four faculties – Theology, Law, Medicine, and Philosophy.

The coat of arms of the university was confirmed by The Estates of the City and County of Groningen in 1615. It consists of the provincial arms, charged with an open book inscribed with the abbreviated words VER/BVM/DNI LV/CER/NA, short for Verbum Domini Lucerna Pedibus Nostris. The shield is surmounted by a golden crown of five leaves and four pearls.

In the first 75 years of its existence about 100 students enrolled every year. Almost half of the students and lecturers came from outside the Netherlands – the first rector magnificus, Ubbo Emmius, came from East Frisia in modern-day Germany, for instance – but at the same time there was already a close relationship between the university and the city and the surrounding region.

The development of the university came to a standstill at the end of the seventeenth and during the eighteenth century because of theological differences of opinion, a difficult relationship with the Regional Assembly and political problems that included the month-long siege of the city by the prince-bishop of Münster ‘Bommen Berend (Bombing Bernhard)’ in 1672 during which the university fielded a voluntary student company (VSC). On average two to three hundred students were registered with the university at any one time during this period.

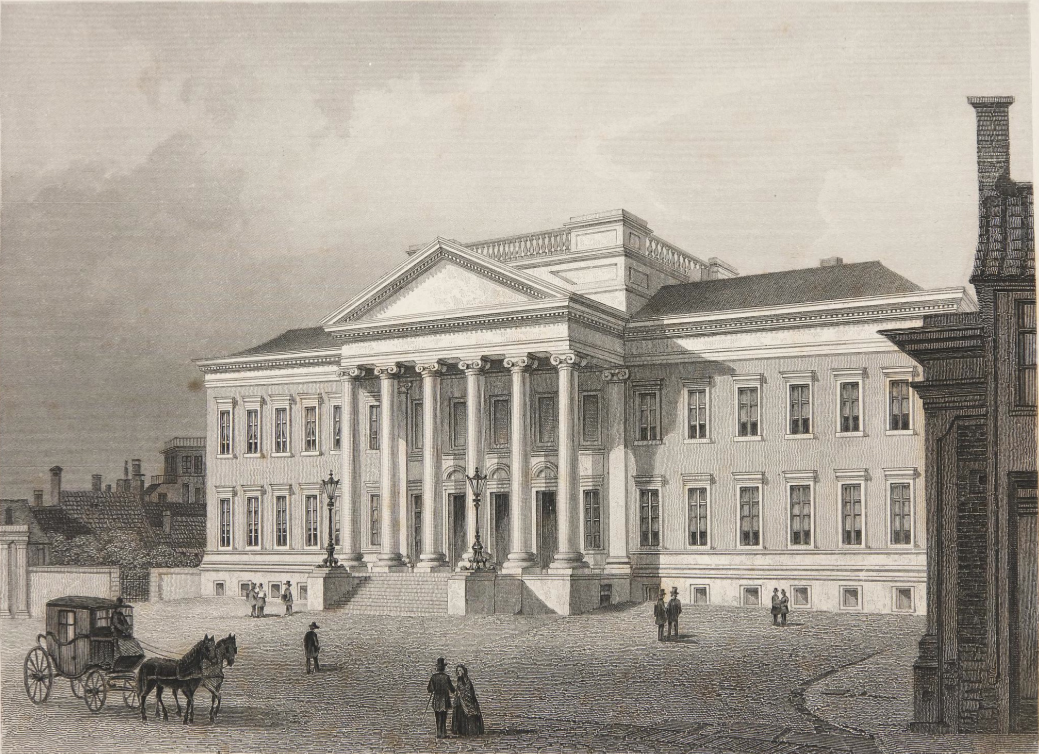
The 19th-century main building in 1858

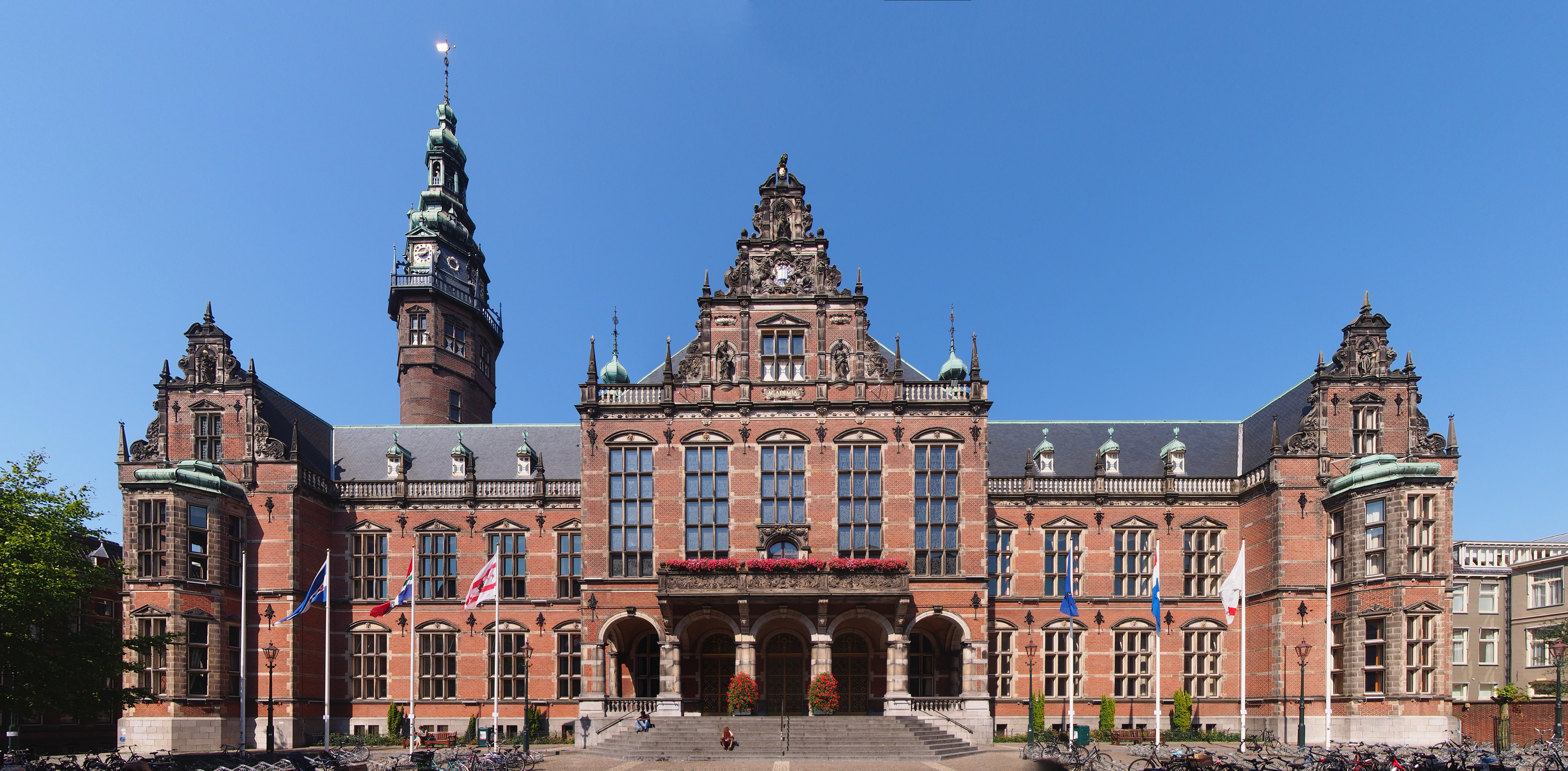
The 20th-century main building in 2016

During the French occupation between 1775 and 1814 the University of Groningen was administered by the Imperial University of Paris. Unlike Leiden University, it was not shut down and the institute was renamed Imperial University of Groningen (Keizerlijke Universiteit Groningen). During this time period, it remained the only open university in the Kingdom of Holland. In 1815 after the Napoleonic Wars, at the same time as Leiden and Utrecht, the university gained recognition as a national college of higher education, but this was followed by discussions about closure. The situation improved when a new main university building, the Academiegebouw, was constructed in 1850, a building that was largely financed by the people of Groningen. A fire completely destroyed the building in 1906.

In the meantime, the Higher Education Act of 1876 had radically improved the position of the university, which was renamed the "Rijksuniversiteit Groningen" (RUG). Teaching took place in Dutch and Latin, and the university was given a research duty as well as an educational duty.

The University of Groningen developed during the first decades of the twentieth century. The number of faculties and courses grew steadily while the number of students grew rapidly. When the university celebrated its first 300 years in 1914 there were 611 registered students; this had grown to 1,000 by 1924. After a drop back during the Depression, and in particular during the Second World War, the number of students grew rapidly from 1945 to reach 20,000 in 1994. In recent times there are about 32,700 students registered at the University of Groningen with the number of foreign students again growing steadily, and following the tradition set by the first Rector Magnificus, the number of German students and researchers has grown strongly.

In March 2015, the RUG signed an agreement with the China Agricultural University to establish a campus in the Chinese city of Yantai. This would have made the RUG the first Dutch university to open a campus in China. The plan was heavily criticised, mainly due to worries about the restriction of academic freedom caused by censorship in China. In January 2018, the plans were cancelled by the Executive Board of the UG, based on the "insufficient support for the project".

== Facts and figures ==
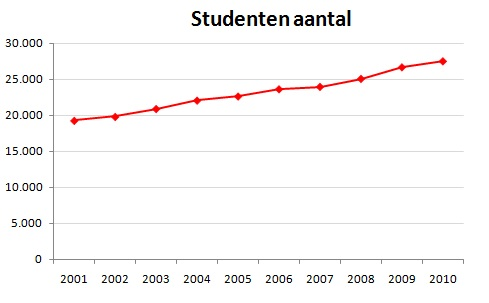
Students numbers

Key facts and figures about the University of Groningen are:

- The university, as of 2025, has 33,000 students enrolled in various programs from the undergraduate level up to doctorate students. This includes 8,250 international students.
- The university currently has 3,600 individuals in its academic staff. The UMCG included, a third of the academic staff is international.
- 425 full professors
- 45+ bachelor's degree programmes (35+ bachelor's degree programmes are taught in English)
- 120+ master's degree programmes taught in English
- 40+ research master's and top programmes
- 11 faculties (one in the Frisian capital of Leeuwarden), nine graduate schools
- 140,000 alumni
- 120+ nationalities
- 8,000 research publications
- 4,350 PhD candidates (51% international)
- 1.0 billion EUR budget
- Research grants from the Dutch Research Council (NWO): 14 starting grants (Veni), 5 experienced research grants (Vidi) and 4 senior research grants (Vici) awarded in 2020
- Research grants from the European Research Council (ERC): 1 Starting Grant, 1 Consolidator Grant, 3 Advanced Grants and 1 Proof of Concept Grant awarded in 2020
- 18 patent applications in 2020

The university operates under the BSA (Binding Study Advice) system, under which a first year undergraduate (bachelor) student must achieve a certain number of ECTS in order to progress to the second year. This varies from 30 ECTS to 45 ECTS among various degrees.

RUG has its own newspaper: the Universiteitskrant.

The university's Center for Information Technology (CIT) houses an IBM Blue Gene/L supercomputer and data center of Target used by the LOFAR project as well as a Virtual Reality and 3D-visualisation center.

== Rankings and reputation ==
University rankings

Global – Overall
- ARWU World: 73 (2025)
- CWUR World: 104 (2025)
- CWTS World: 122 (2025)
- QS World: =147 (2026)
- THE World: =82 (2026)
- USNWR Global: =75 (2026)

- The University of Groningen (RUG) is a member of the so-called Excellence Group of universities in Europe. The Excellence Group has 56 members, which is 1.3 percent of the approximately 4,500 European institutions of higher education.
- RUG belongs to the top 100 large comprehensive research universities in the world.
- RUG was #80 in the Times Higher Education World University Rankings 2021.
- According to the 2019 U.S. News & World Report, the Faculty of Economics and Business ranks as 3rd in the Netherlands, 10th in Europe and 32nd in the world for Economics and Business.
- In 2021, the university ranked #64 in the Academic Ranking of World Universities (ARWU). In addition to this overall score, the university falls within the global top 100 for several specific fields and subjects: Psychology (41), Clinical Medicine (51–75), Business Administration (37), Ecology (51–75).
- RUG was ranked #139 worldwide in the QS WUR 2024.
- The university was ranked #73 worldwide in 2019 by the National Taiwan University that publishes the Performance Ranking of Scientific Papers for World Universities.
- The Webometrics placed the university #85 worldwide and #14 in Europe.
- The university was ranked 3rd place in the UI GreenMetric World University Ranking in 2021, which includes 780 universities. UI GreenMetric World University Rankings was launched by Universitas Indonesia (UI) to focus awareness on sustainability in university policy-making. Universities are ranked in the basis of self-reported data in the areas of Setting and Infrastructure, Energy and Climate Change, Waste, Water, Transportation, and Education and Research.
- From 2019 to 2020, the university was ranked 91st place in the Centre for World University Rankings (CWUR).
- In 2019, Times Higher Education introduced a new ranking: the Europe Teaching Rankings. The university was ranked 26th place, which includes more than 200 universities. This new ranking focusses on higher education institutions' teaching quality and learning environments for students.
- The university was ranked 1st in the Netherlands by U-Multirank (UMR)in 2019. UMR was developed by a consortium consisting of the Centre for Higher Education Policy Studies (CHEPS) in Twente, the Centre for Higher Education (CHE) in Germany and the Centre for Science and Technology Studies (CWTS) in Leiden. The university achieved the highest score on 16 indicators that include International Orientation dimension, Research and Knowledge Transfer.
- The Faculty of Economics and Business is accredited by both AACSB and EQUIS.

== Organisation ==
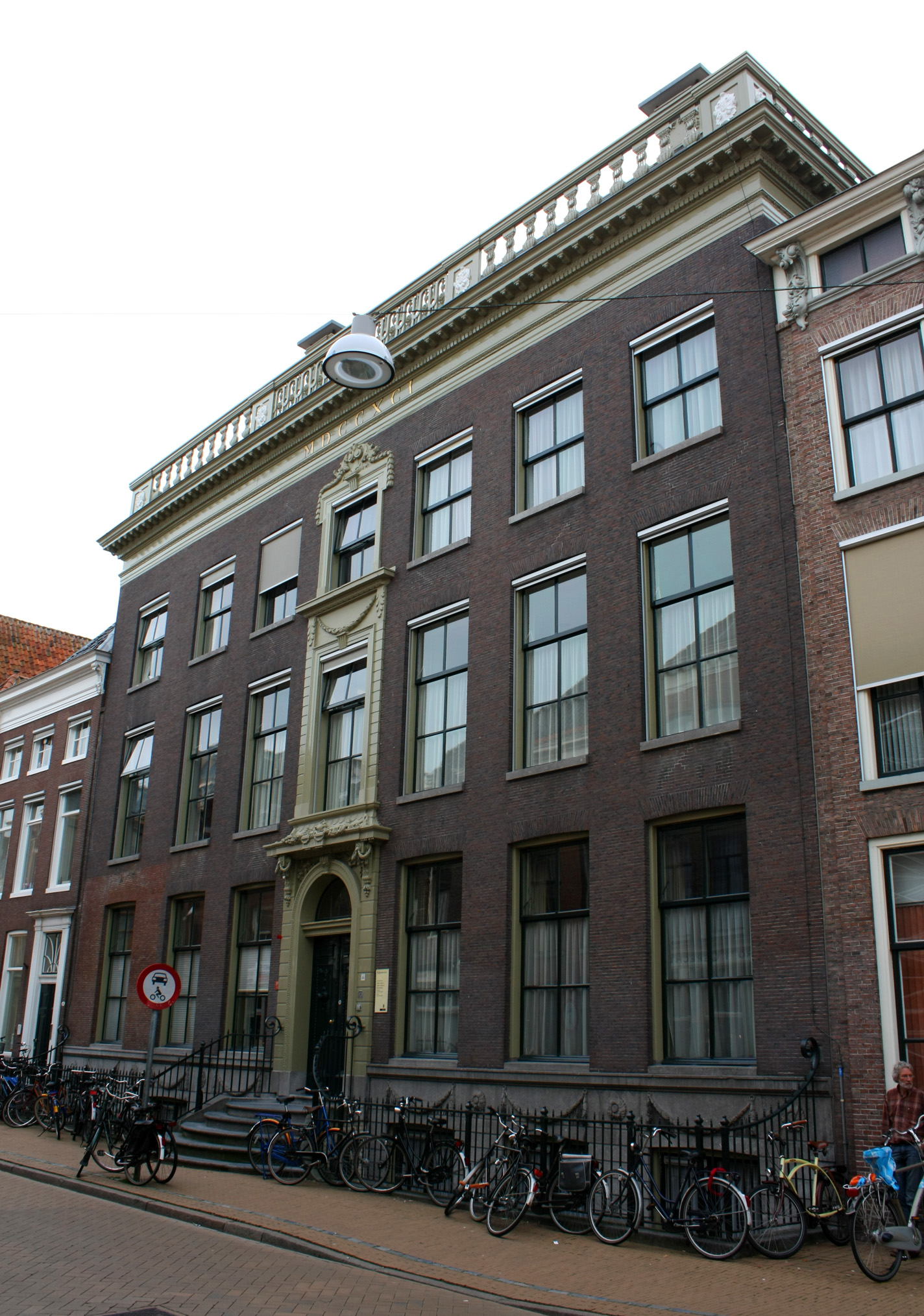
Administration Building, Oude Boteringestraat 44

The RUG has 6,250 employees.

The university library was renovated between 2013 and 2017. The RUG has a branch in Leeuwarden. Plans to establish a "branch campus" in China's Yantai were called off in January 2018, and the University Museum is now in the process of being established.

The University of Groningen is represented in the Academic Heritage Foundation, a foundation that aims to preserve university collections and cultural treasures.

=== Faculties ===
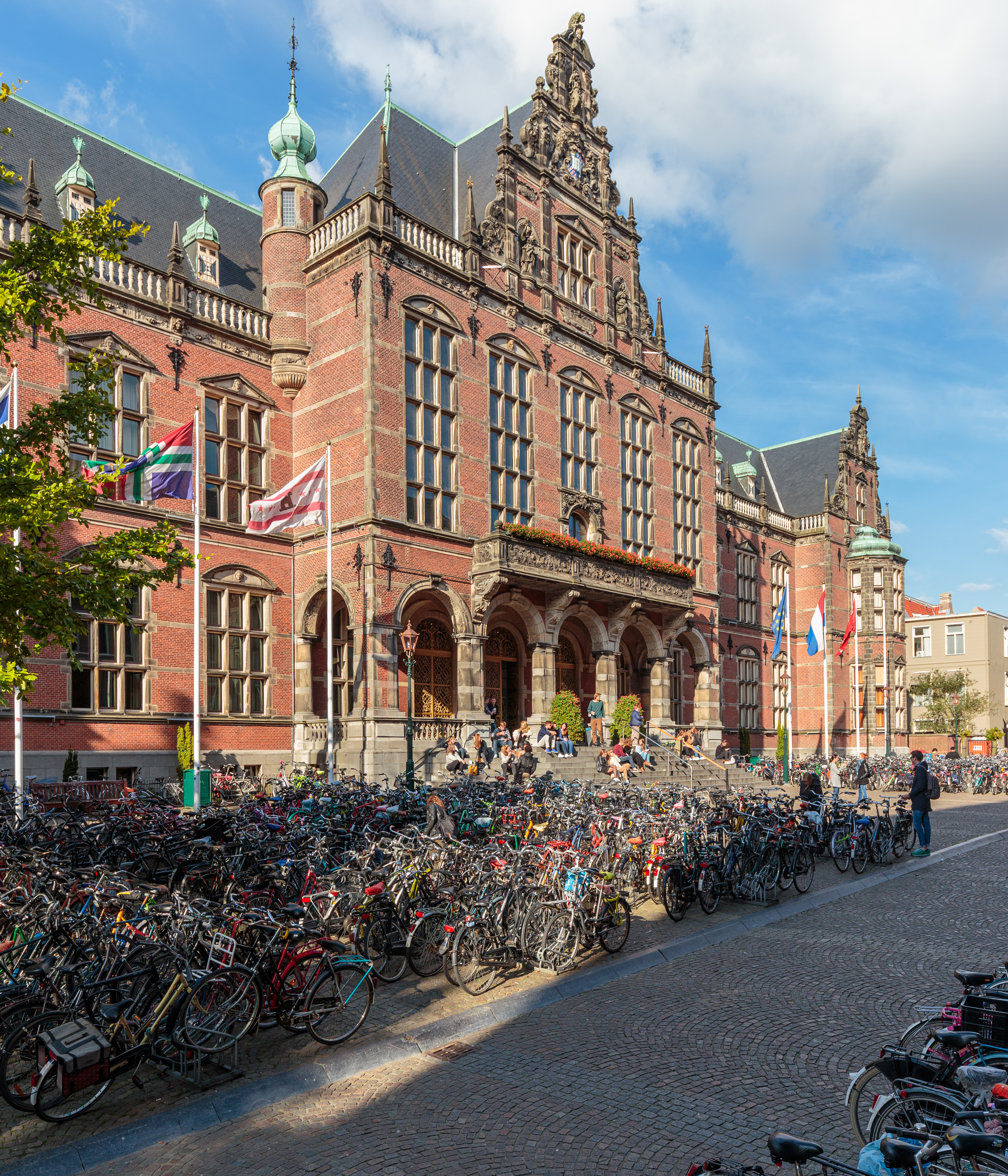
Academy Building of the University of Groningen

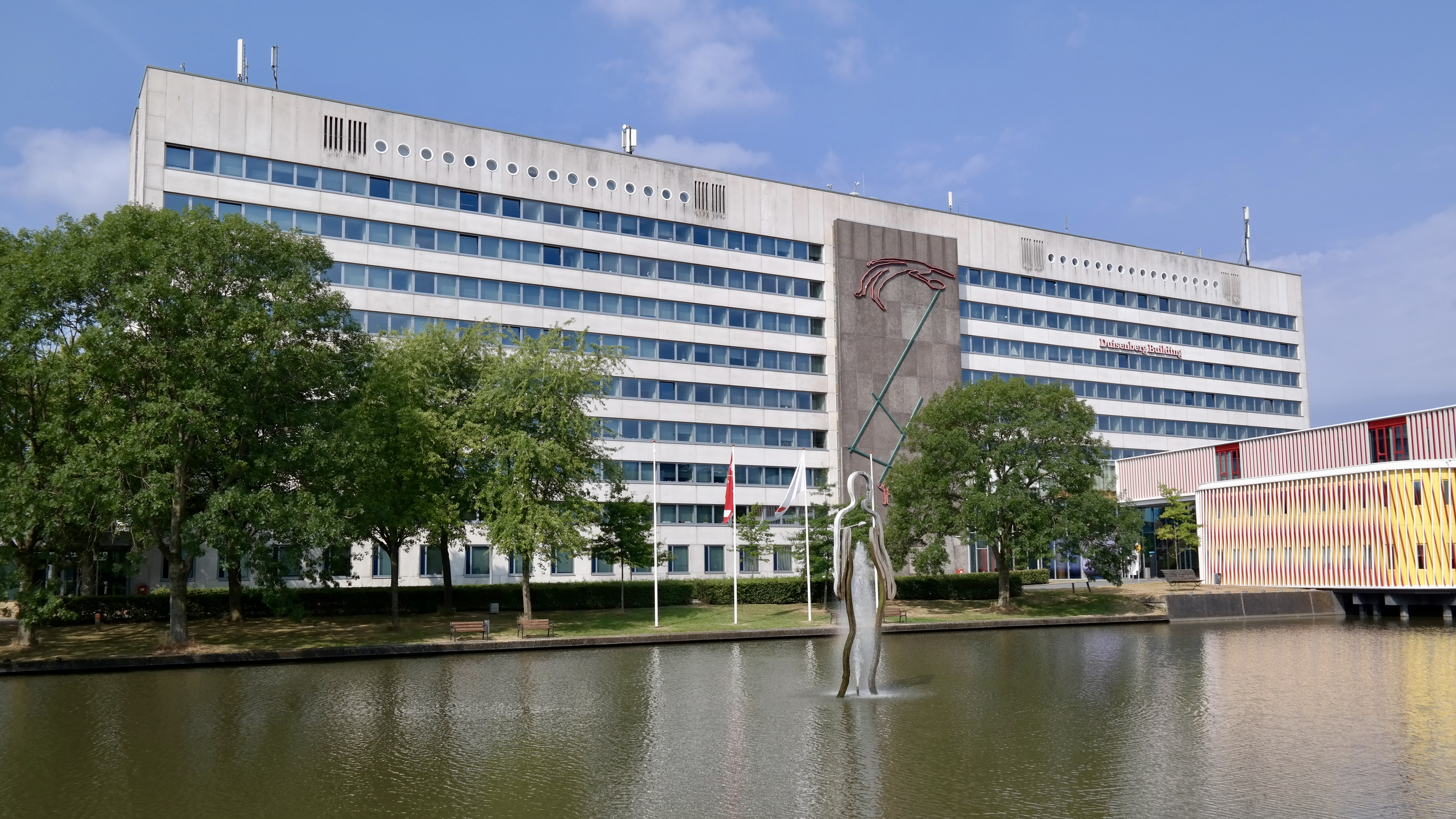
Duisenberg building (Faculty of Economics and Business)

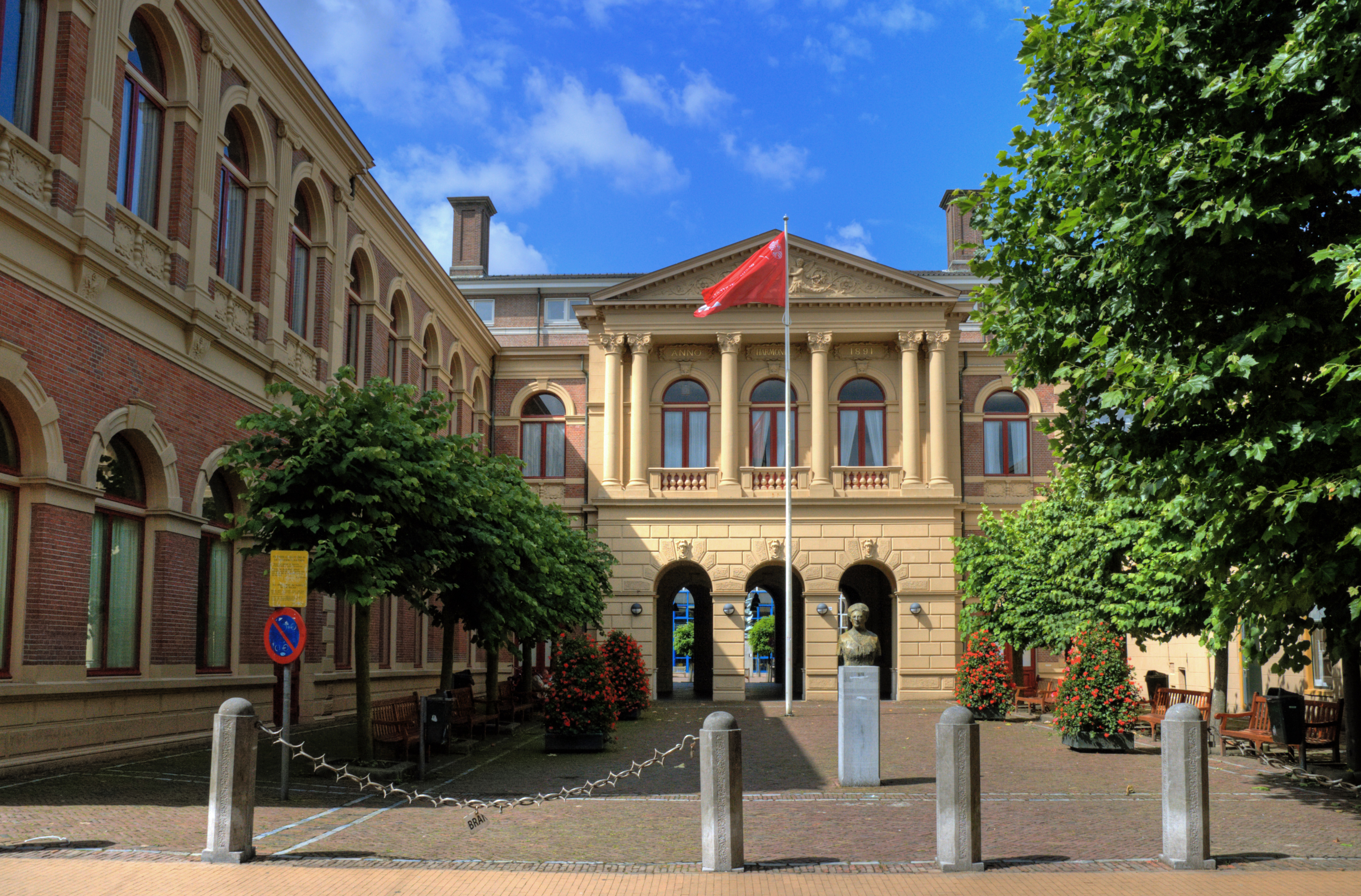
Harmoniecomplex (Faculty of Arts and Language Centre)

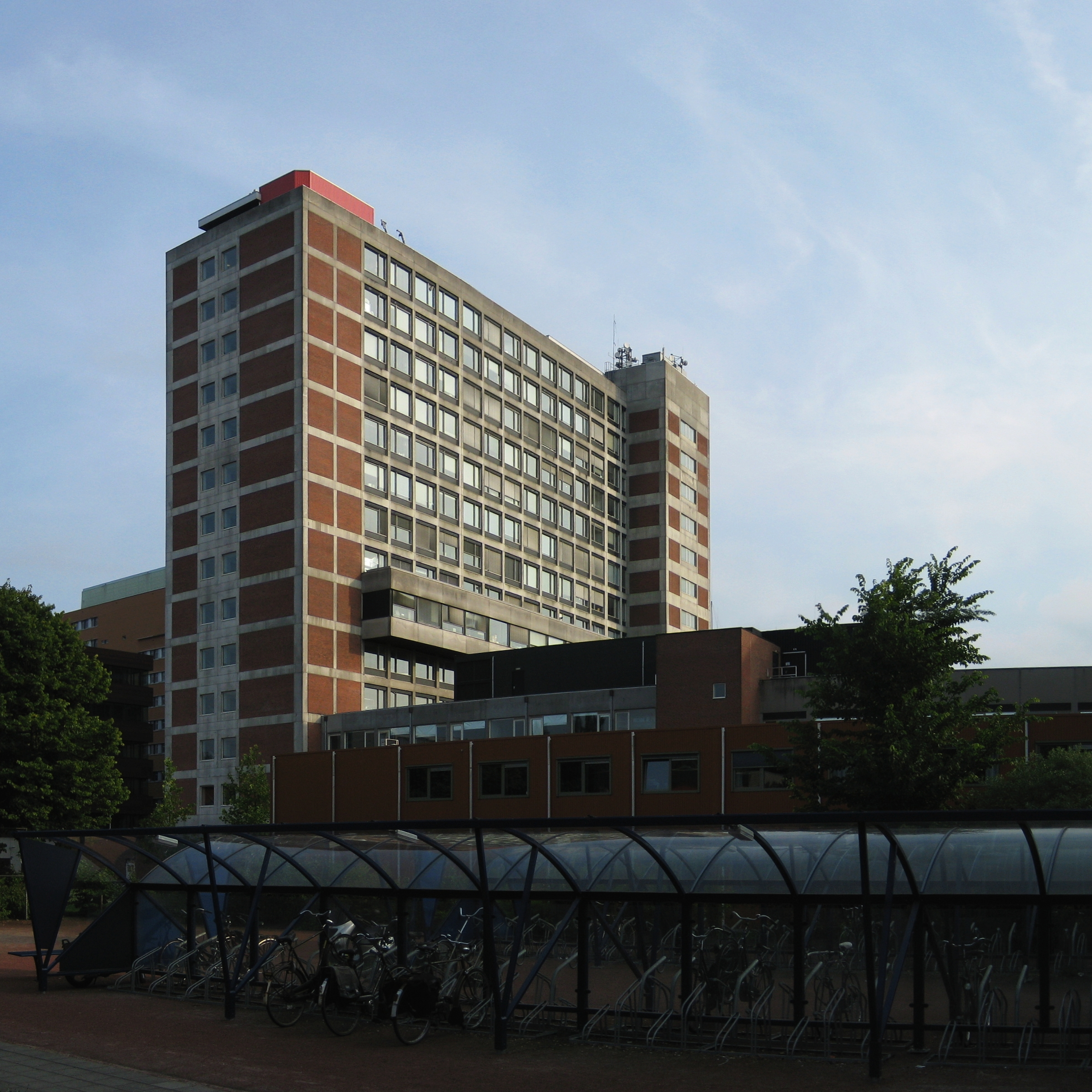
Faculty of Medical Sciences

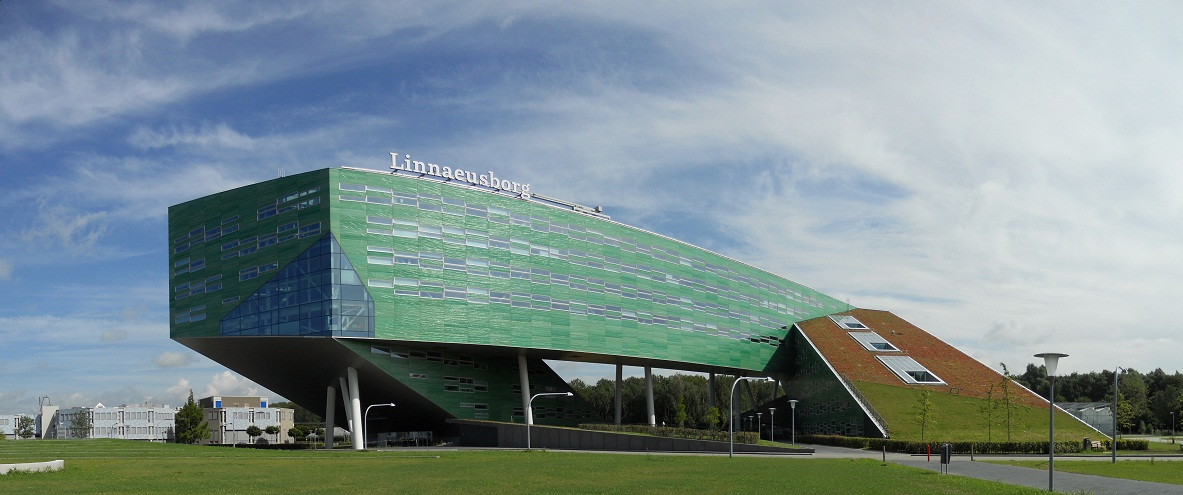
Linnaeusborg (Faculty of Science and Engineering)

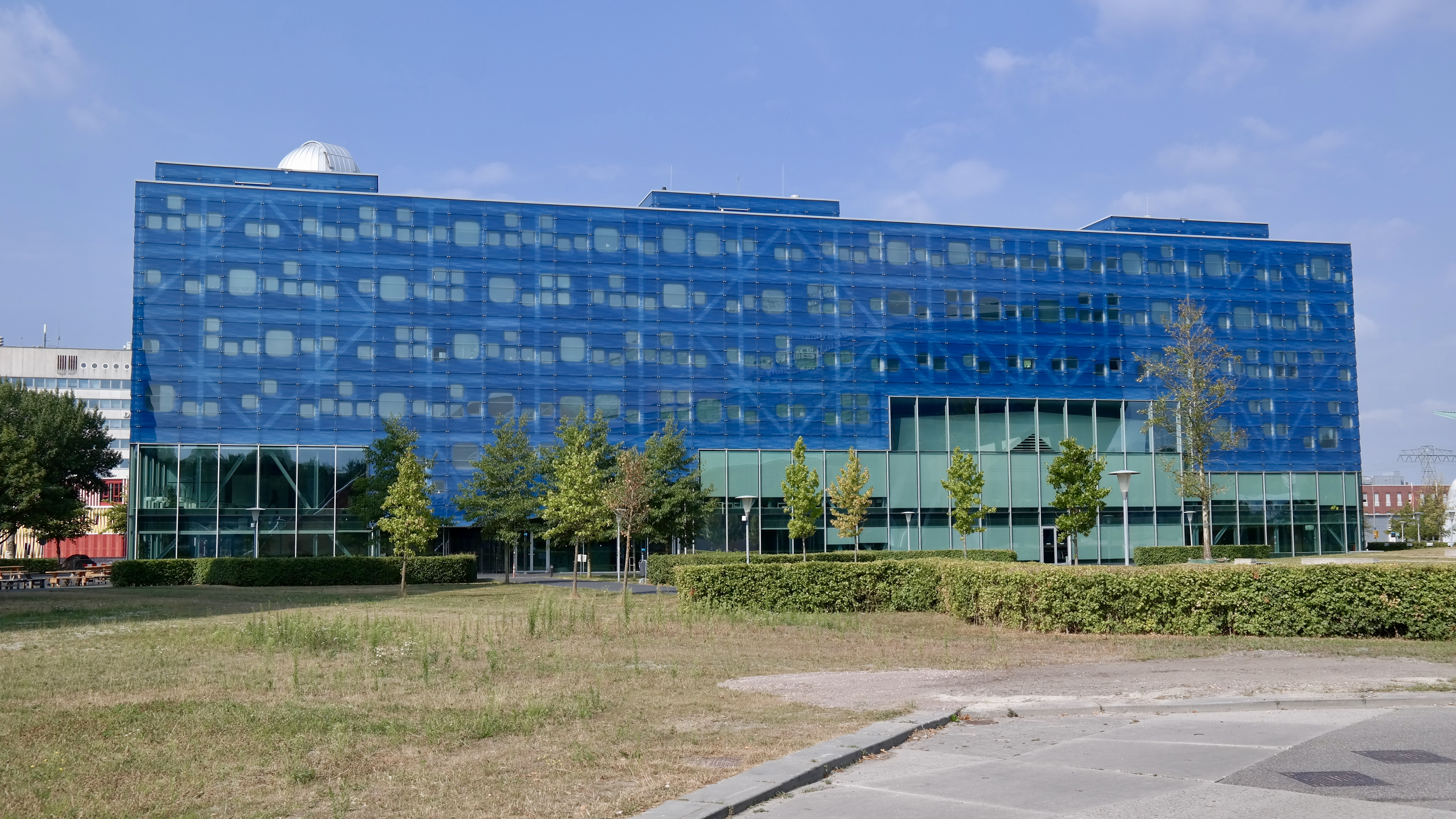
Bernoulliborg (Faculty of Science and Engineering)

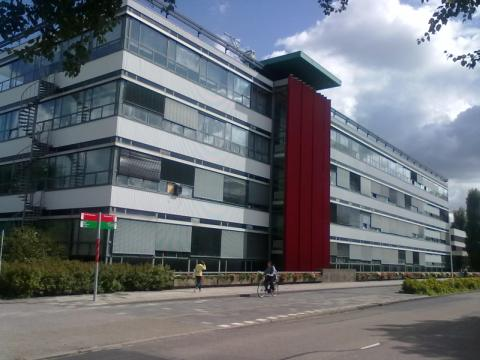
Faculty of Science and Engineering

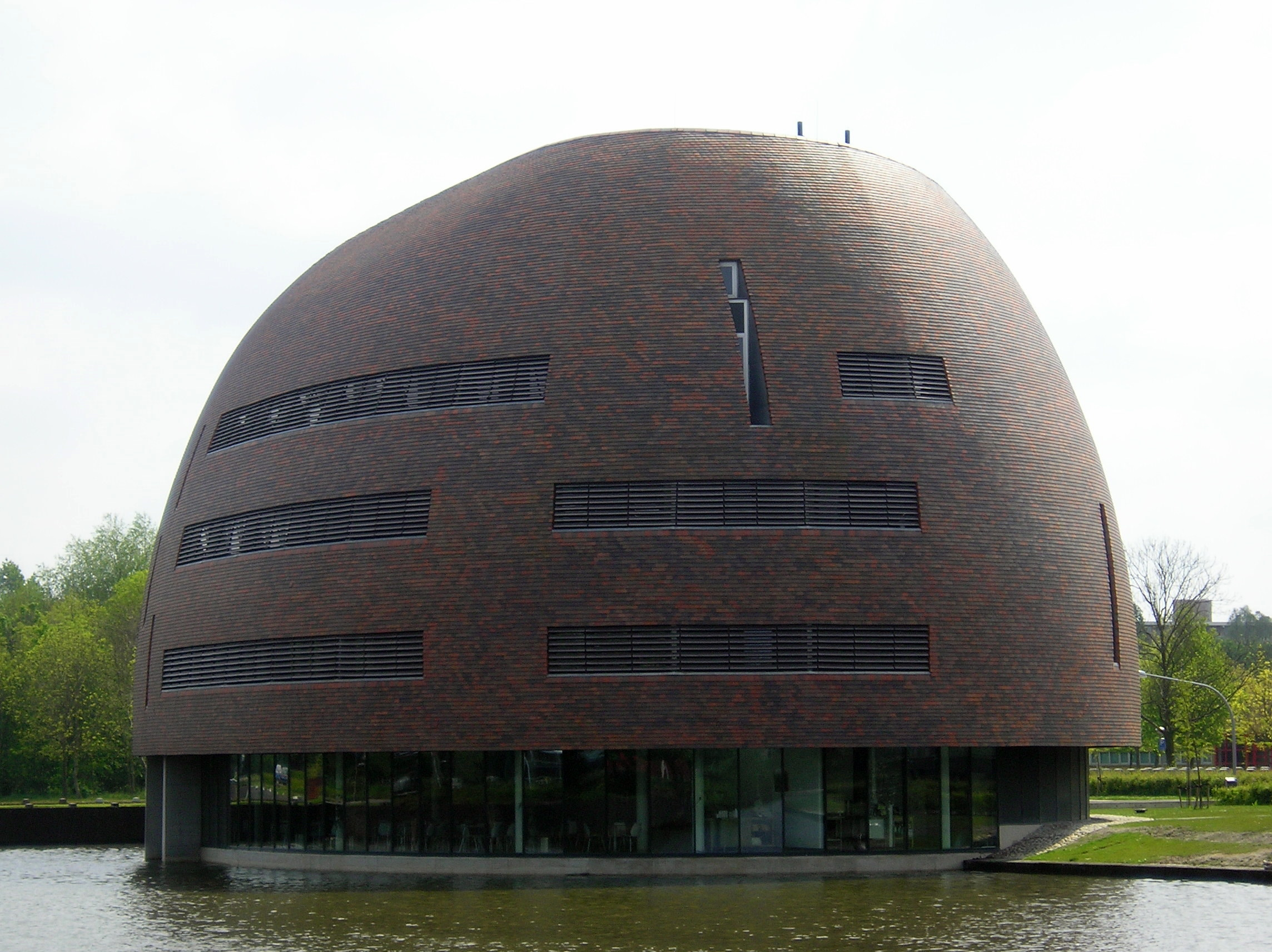
Smitsborg (Donald Smits Centre of Information Technology, CIT)

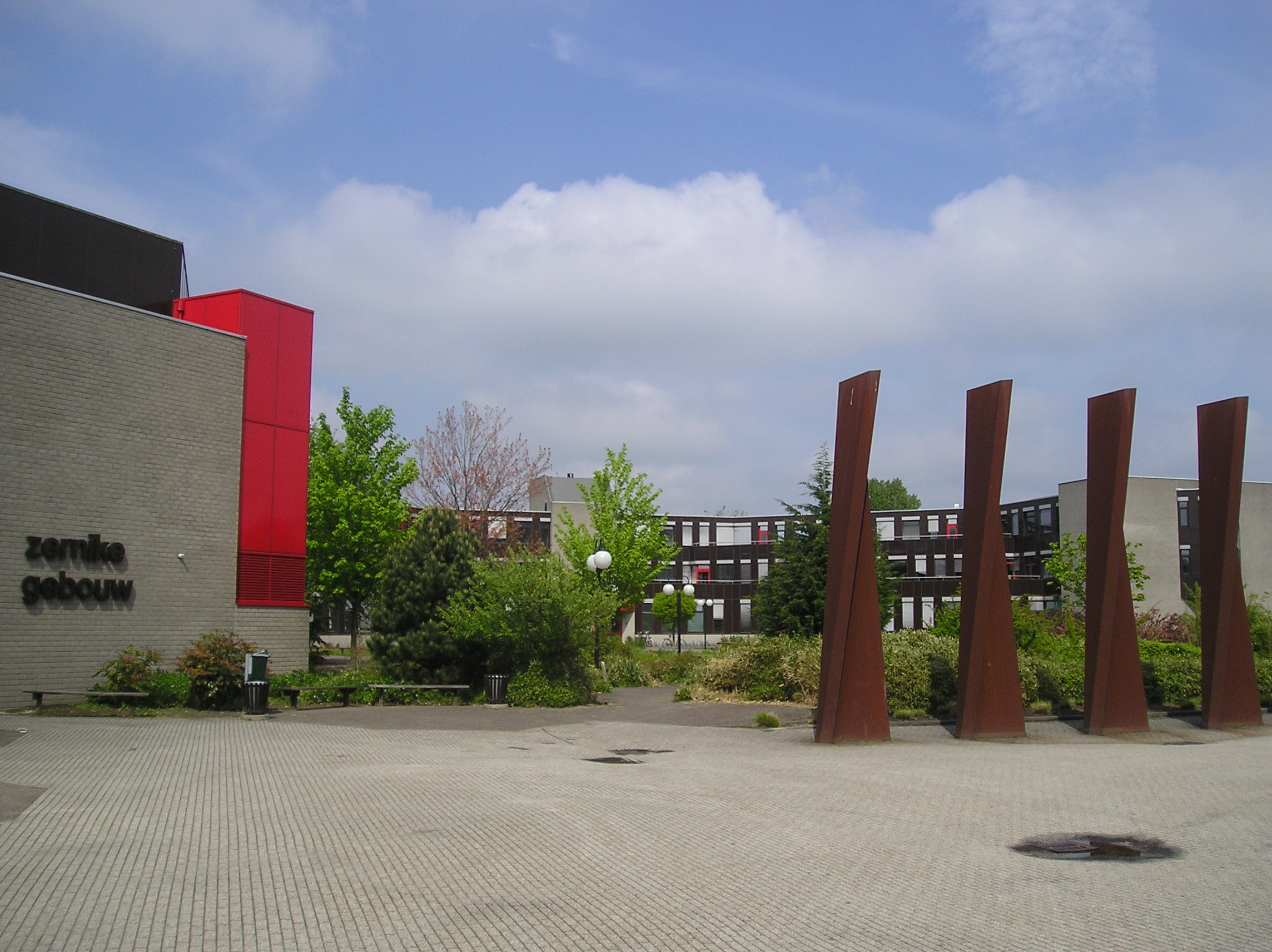
Kapteynborg (Astronomy)

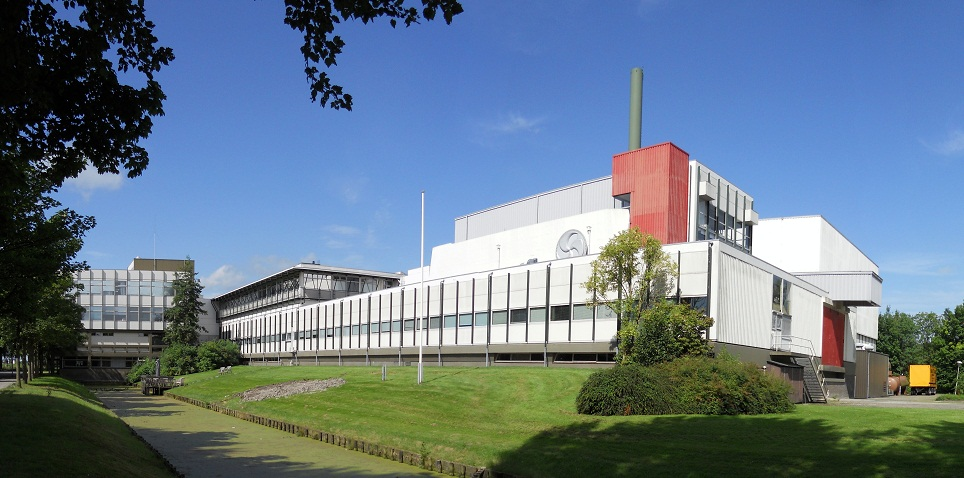
KVI-CART Research institute

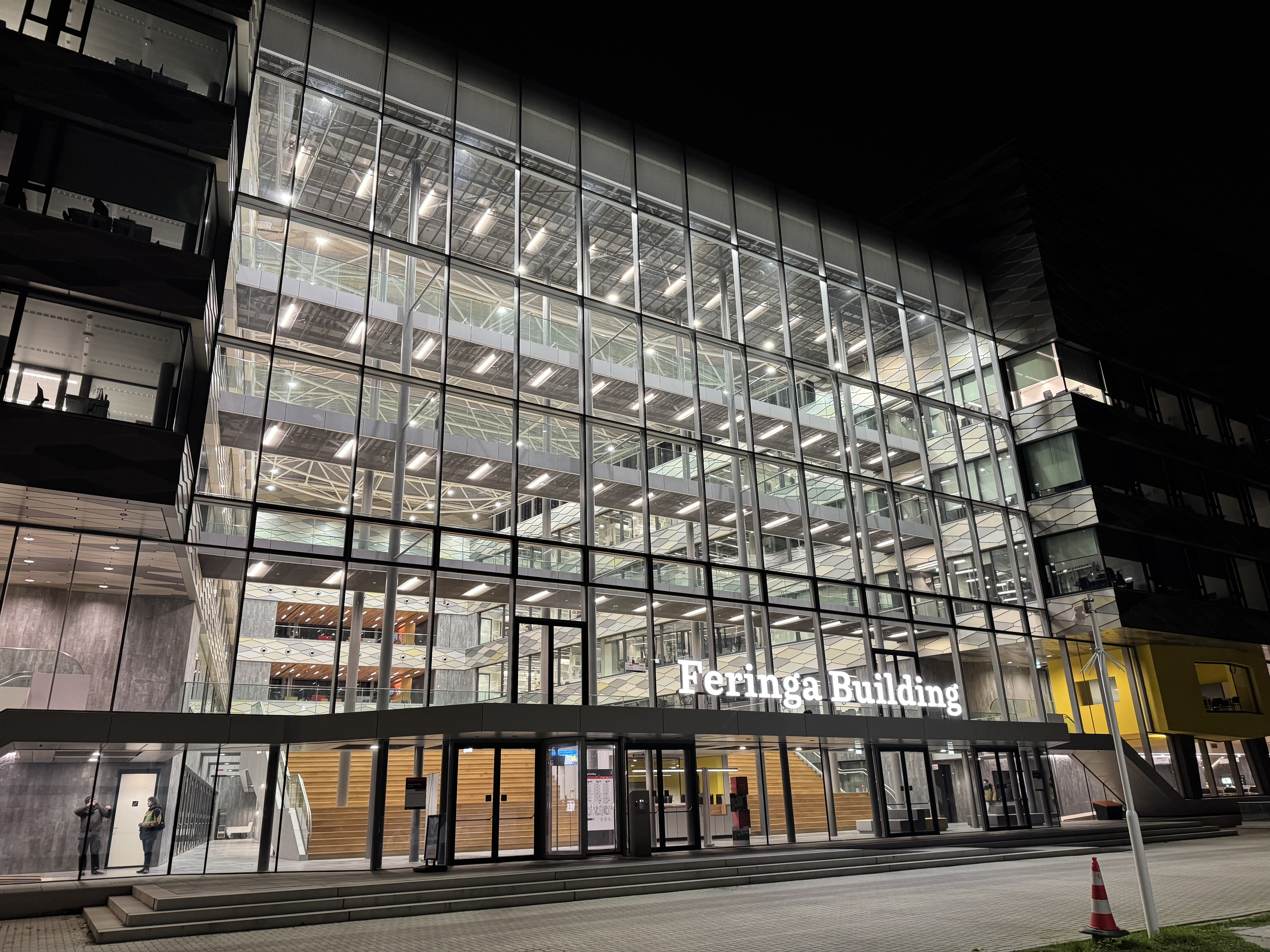
Feringa Building (Faculty of Science and Engineering)

The University of Groningen is organized in eleven faculties that offer programmes and courses in the fields of humanities, social sciences, law, economics and business, spatial sciences, life sciences, and natural sciences and technology. Each faculty (cf., College in the USA or School in Europe) is a formal grouping of academic degree programmes, schools and institutes, discipline areas, research centres, and/or any combination of these drawn together for educational purposes. Each faculty offers bachelor's, master's, PhD, and exchange programmes, while some also offer short certificate courses.

Since 2014, the RUG also has a partly independent liberal arts college, University College Groningen (UCG).

- Faculty of Economics and Business
- Faculty of Arts
- Faculty of Law
- Faculty of Religion, Culture and Society
- Faculty of Philosophy
- Faculty of Behavioural and Social Sciences
- Faculty of Medical Sciences
- Faculty of Science and Engineering
- Faculty of Spatial Sciences
- University College Groningen
- Campus Fryslân

=== National cooperation ===
- Exposome-NL, Dutch consortium cooperating in the field of exposome research.

=== International cooperation ===
The University of Groningen engages in many types of international cooperation throughout both teaching and research. The main networks and partners of the university are:

- Enlight, an alliance of nine European universities, The Guild of European research-intensive universities and the Coimbra group, a network of 37 long established European multidisciplinary universities.
- Strategic partnerships (academic connection): Universität Hamburg (UHH) and Carl von Ossietzky Universität Oldenburg
- Global strategic partnerships: Nanyang Technological University (Singapore), Osaka University (Japan), Macquarie University (Australia), Universitas Gadjah Mada (Indonesia), Universidad de Antioquia (Colombia), Universidad de Chile (Chile), Universidad Nacional Autónoma de México (Mexico), Universidade de São Paulo (Brazil), Stellenbosch University (South Africa)

== Campus ==
The various faculties are housed around the city. Most of the faculties- including the faculties of Law, Arts and Philosophy are located in and around the city center. The university's original building, which acts as the main administrative building, lies exactly in the center of the city at the Broerstraat. The faculty of medical sciences is located close by at the University Medical Center Groningen (UMCG). The Faculties of Economics and Business, Spatial Sciences, and Science and Engineering are housed in the northern outskirts of the city, at the Zernike Campus, named after Nobel Prize winner Frits Zernike. The Zernike campus is also shared by the Hanze University of Applied Sciences, the other big university in the city, making the total number of students studying there around 40,000.

The university has libraries in three locations: the main one at the city center, one in the Duisenberg building in Zernike Campus, and one in the faculty of medicine, that includes a vast array of books and online material for students. The university has also recently opened another campus in Leeuwarden, Friesland, referred to as "Campus Fryslân", that offers multiple disciplines in both undergraduate and postgraduate levels.

== Student life ==
The city of Groningen is known as the student city of the Netherlands; around one-third of the city's residents are students at either The University of Groningen or at the Hanze University of Applied Sciences. The university, through ACLO, offers a wide range of sporting activities, and courses. Almost each sport has its own association, and offers the use of its facilities at discount rates for students.

The university also has multiple student societies that organize social events for its members, as well as student and study associations, that are mostly concerned with specific faculties and courses.

The use of bicycles as the means for transport is particularly prevalent for locals and students alike, and has integrated, labelled bike paths from the city center to Zernike. The city is popularly referred to as "The World Cycling City" because of this.

=== Student housing ===
The University of Groningen does not have student accommodation. It does, however, offer students with accommodation via SSH Student Housing, which operates student houses in various locations in Groningen, and various other cities within the Netherlands. A significant number of students live in private accommodations within the city, however, a recent addition to the housing options for students is The Student Hotel as well. In an effort to combat the annual housing shortage, the city of Groningen has incentivized the construction of short-term accommodation such as The Village which is made of shipping containers for international students. The Dutch government has strict laws for private accommodations for both tenants (students) and the landlords, so that fair rent prices, and renting conditions can be maintained.

In 2018, the university received national attention due to the housing crisis in the city of Groningen. Due to the fact that most incoming students at the university are primarily from other parts of the country, or the world, there has been a lack of housing options for students. Especially in the fall semester of 2021 the housing crisis hit its peak with hundreds of students reportedly not having any accommodation and resorting to emergency shelters. The housing shorting evoked a protest in the city centre which culminated in the Academy building being temporarily occupied by students to put pressure on the city to extend emergency housing.

== Research ==
In 2023, 635 PhDs were awarded (12% of the total for the Netherlands). Around 60% of newly-admitted PhD students came from abroad.

=== Research schools, centres and institutes ===
Humanities and Social Sciences

- Center for Language and Cognition Groningen (CLCG)
- Centre for Religion and Heritage
- Centre for Religion, Conflict and Globalization (CRCG)
- Centre Religion, Health and Wellbeing
- CRASIS, Culture, Religion and Society in Graeco-Roman Antiquity
- Globalisation Studies Groningen (GSG)
- Groningen Institute of Archeology (GIA)
- Groningen Institute for Educational research (GION)
- Groningen Research Institute of Philosophy (GRIPH)
- Groningen Research Institute for the Study of Culture (ICOG)
- Heymans Institute
- Institute of Indian Studies
- Interuniversity Center for Social Science Theory and Methodology (ICS)
- Qumran Institute
- Urban and Regional Studies Institute (URSI)

Law

- Centre for Law, Administration and Society (CRBS)
- Groningen Centre of Energy Law (GCEL)

Economics & Business

- SOM research institute

Life Sciences

- Research School of Behavioral and Cognitive Sciences (BCN) / UMCG
- Research Institute BCN-BRAIN / UMCG
- Cancer Research Center Groningen (CRCG) / UMCG
- Groningen Institute for Evolutionary Life Sciences (GELIFES)
- Groningen University Institute for Drug Exploration (GUIDE) / UMCG
- Groningen Biomolecular Sciences and Biotechnology (GBB)
- Groningen Research Institute of Pharmacy (GRIP)
- Science in Healthy Ageing and healthcaRE (SHARE), UMCG
- W.J. Kolff Institute for Biomedical Engineering and Materials Science / UMCG

Science and Engineering

- Bernoulli Institute for Mathematics, Computer Science and Artificial Intelligence
- ENTEG - Engineering and Technology Institute Groningen
- ESRIG - Energy and Sustainability Research Institute Groningen
- GBB - Groningen Biomolecular Sciences and Biotechnology Institute
- GELIFES - Groningen Institute for Evolutionary Life Sciences
- GRIP - Groningen Research Institute of Pharmacy
- ISEC - Institute for Science Education and Communication
- Kapteyn Astronomical Institute
- Stratingh Institute for Chemistry
- Van Swinderen Institute for Particle Physics and Gravity
- Zernike Institute for Advanced Materials (ZIAM)

=== Graduate schools ===
The University of Groningen's Graduate Schools are organized somewhat different from its international counterparts. The main difference is that the Graduate Schools do not contain all Master's programmes; Graduate Schools manage and facilitate the two-year Master's programmes: top master's degree programmes and Research master's degree programmes.

- Graduate School of Behavioural and Social Sciences
- Graduate School of Economics and Business
- Graduate School of Humanities
- Graduate School of Law
- Graduate School of Medical Sciences
- Graduate School of Philosophy
- Graduate School of Science
- Graduate School of Spatial Sciences
- Graduate School of Religion, Culture and Society

== Notable alumni ==
Notable alumni of the University of Groningen include:

=== Heads of government ===
- Paramanga Ernest Yonli, Prime Minister of Burkina Faso
- John Stuart, 3rd Earl of Bute, Prime Minister of Great Britain
- Suzanne Camelia-Römer, Prime Minister of the Netherlands Antilles
- Etienne Ys, Prime Minister of the Netherlands Antilles
- Johan Remkes, Deputy Prime Minister of the Netherlands

=== Business leaders ===
- Bart Becht, former CEO of Reckitt Benckiser and former partner of JAB Holding Company
- Maarten van den Bergh, Chairman of Lloyds Bank
- Marc Bolland, former CEO of Heineken, Morrisons and Marks & Spencer
- Dolf van den Brink, CEO of Heineken N.V.
- Paul Polman, CEO of Unilever
- Roel de Vries, Global Head of Marketing at Nissan Motor Corporation
- Hans Wijers, Chairman of the Supervisory Board of ING, former CEO of AkzoNobel
- George Möller, CEO of Robeco, former CEO of Euronext
- Chris Vogelzang, CEO of Danske Bank
- Volkert Engelsman, CEO of Eosta
- Paul Fentener van Vlissingen, CEO of SHV Holdings
- Marjan Rintel, CEO of KLM, former CEO of Dutch Railways
- Louise Gunning-Schepers, chairman of the Supervisory Board of the Schiphol Group
- Maria Oudeman, president of Utrecht University, former director of Equinor

=== Economists and scientists ===
- Wim Duisenberg, first president of the European Central Bank
- Klaas Knot, current President of the Dutch central bank De Nederlandsche Bank (DNB)
- Dirk Stikker, Secretary General of NATO
- Gerbrand Bakker, early 19th century physician
- Johan van Benthem, logician
- Johann Bernoulli, mathematician
- Bart Bok, astronomer
- Hans van Abeelen, first Dutch behavior geneticist
- Corina Brussaard, Antarctic researcher in viral ecology and phytoplankton
- Anita Buma, Antarctic researcher in marine ecophysiology
- Wei Ji Ma, professor of psychology and neuroscience
- Ben Feringa, recipient of the Nobel Prize in Chemistry in 2016 for his work on molecular motors
- Heike Kamerlingh Onnes, recipient of the Nobel Prize in Physics while professor in Leiden for his experiments on the properties of matter at low temperatures which made the production of liquid helium possible
- Frits Zernike, recipient of the Nobel Prize in Physics for his invention of the phase-contrast optical microscope in 1953.

=== Politicians ===
- Bruno Bruins, former Dutch State Secretary for Education, Culture and Science
- Job Cohen, former mayor of Amsterdam and former leader of the Dutch Labour Party
- Pim Fortuyn, lecturer, later politician and founder of the Pim Fortuyn List (and assassinated in 2002)
- Niccolò Invidia, member of parliament Italy
- Pavela Mitova, member of parliament Bulgaria
- Agnes Mulder, politician (King's Commissioner of Drenthe)
- Jacques Wallage, former mayor of Groningen
- Halbe Zijlstra, former Dutch Minister of Foreign Affairs

=== Others ===
- Albert Hofman, epidemiologist at the Harvard T.H. Chan School of Public Health
- Matthijs Valstar (oral and maxillofacial surgeon), scientist at the Netherlands Cancer Institute, led the discovery of the Tubarial salivary gland in 2020
- Turtle Bunbury, Irish historian and author
- James Burnett, Scottish judge and a founder of modern comparative historical linguistics
- Lex van Dam, hedge fund manager, featured on Million Dollar Traders on BBC2
- Ubbo Emmius, founder of the University of Groningen and first rector magnificus
- Willem Frederik Hermans, lecturer and writer
- Gerardus Heymans, philosopher and psychologist
- Jack Hoeksema, linguist and professor in the Department of Dutch Language and Culture
- Pieter Crull, jurist, attorney-general of Suriname and acting governor
- Peter Hofstee, professor of theoretical physics, joined IBM in 1996, currently the chief architect of the Synergistic Processor Element (SPE) of the Cell microprocessor
- Johan Huizinga, historian
- Aletta Jacobs, first woman in the Netherlands to receive an MD
- Ashin Jinarakkhita, Indonesian Buddhist monk
- Roland Kupers, Dutch theoretical physicist
- Johann Heinrich Alting, theologian
- Annemarie, Duchess of Parma, journalist, consultant, and member of the Dutch royal family
- Jaap Kunst, ethnomusicologist (studied law)
- Prince Maurits van Oranje Nassau, first cousin of King Willem-Alexander of the Netherlands
- John Nerbonne, professor of humanities computing, expert in dialectology, member of the Dutch Royal Academy of Science
- Wubbo Ockels, first Dutch astronaut, received a PhD degree in physics and mathematics, 1973
- Jan Oort, astronomer
- Johannes Jacobus Poortman, philosopher, psychologist
- Dagmar Reichardt, professor of Cultural Industry at University of Latvia
- James Renwick (1662–1688) Scottish Covenanter
- Willem de Sitter, astronomer
- Tom Snijders, statistician and sociologist, expert on multilevel analysis and developer of Siena in R, a program for longitudinal social network analysis
- Henk G. Sol, Professor of Business Engineering and ICT
- Pieter Jelles Troelstra, lawyer, politician (early 20th century)
- René Veenstra, professor of sociology, expert on social network analysis and group processes in bullying
- Wietse Venema, programmer and physicist
- Clemens von Bönninghausen, lawyer, botanist, homeopathic physician
- Epke Zonderland, 2012 Olympics gold medalist

== Notable researchers ==
- Dirk Bezemer (born 1971), economist
- Mineke Bosch, historian
- Cornelis de Bot, linguist
- Marijn van Dijk, developmental psychologist
- Caroline van Eck, art historian
- Paul van Geert, developmental psychologist
- Henk de Haan, economist and politician
- Nathalie Katsonis, chemist
- Wander Lowie, linguist
- Angus Maddison, British economist
- Lodi Nauta, professor of the History
- Sijbren Otto, chemist of Philosophy
- Erik Scherder
- Wolfgang Stroebe, social psychologist
- Albert Szent-Györgyi, biochemist, awarded the Nobel Prize in Physiology or Medicine in 1937
- Marjolijn Verspoor, linguist
- Ben Feringa, synthetic organic chemist, awarded the Nobel Prize in Chemistry in 2016
- Pauline Kleingeld, professor of Ethics and its history
- Amina Helmi, Argentine astronomer, and a professor of dynamics, structure and formation of the milky way
- Cisca Wijmenga, professor of Human Genetics
- Theunis Piersma, professor of Global Flyway Ecology
- Bert Röling, Professor of Law and progenitor of the field of Polemology in the Netherlands
- Linda Steg, professor of environmental psychology, and a pioneer and world leader in the field of environmental psychology
- Sabeth Verpoorte professor of microfluidics and miniaturized "lab-on-a-chip" systems in the Faculty of Science and Engineering
- Jacques Zeelen, professor of globalization studies and humanitarian action

== See also ==
- Education in the Netherlands
- Energy Delta Institute
- List of early modern universities in Europe
