= European Business Awards for the Environment =

- Description: Recognizing companies that combine competitiveness with environmental protection
- Country: European Union
- Presented by: European Commission
- Website: ec.europa.eu/environment/awards/

European Business Awards for the Environment are awarded by the European Union to recognise companies that combine competitiveness with respect for the environment.

The awards take into consideration voluntary schemes such as EMAS and Ecolabel, together with other comparable projects, which demonstrate commitment to develop and apply sustainable management practices. The awards were originally established in 1987 as the European Better Environment Awards for Industry, renamed in 2000 as the European Awards for the Environment, and renamed again in 2004 as the current European Business Awards for the Environment.

The award is presented in five categories: Management, Product and services, Process innovation, International business cooperation and Business and biodiversity.

== Recent Winners ==
Source: European Commission

=== Management Award ===
- 2018/19 A&B Laboratorios de Biotecnología S.A.U (Spain), for Integration of the Sustainable Development Goals in their strategy for a sustainable and competitive growth
- 2016/17 (Large Company) CMS Window Systems (UK), for CMS Innovation Hub
- 2014/15 Eczacıbaşı Yapı Gereçleri (VitrA) (Turkey), for Blue Life Integrated Sustainability Management System
- 2012 Marks & Spencer (UK), for Marks & Spencer Plan A - Doing the Right Thing
- 2010 Findus Group (UK), for Fish for Life: Supporting Sustainable Fisheries
- 2008 The Co-operative Group Ltd (UK), for The Co-operative Group’s Approach to Sustainable Development

=== The Product and Services Award ===
- 2018/19 AFULudine (France), for An environmentally-neutral lubricant
- 2016/17 Hydromx International A.S. (Turkey), for Energy Efficient Heat Transfer Fluid for Heating and Cooling
- 2014/15 EcoNation (Belgium), for Lighten the Energy Bill
- 2012 Aquamarine Power (UK), for Aquamarine Power's Oyster wave energy technology
- 2010 EnergyICT (Belgium), for Implementation of the Advanced Energy Management System, EIServer, at the British Retailer TESCO
- 2008 Ertex-Solar GmbH (Austria), for Ertex-Solar – photovoltaic modules in laminated safety glass technology

=== The Process Innovation Award ===
- 2018/19 DSM-Niaga (Netherlands), for Redesign product from scratch for the circular economy, using only recyclable materials and a reversible glue
- 2016/17 M2i Life Sciences (France), for Pheromonal mating disruption through paintball against the pine processionary moth
- 2014/15 Daimler AG (Germany), for CO_{2} Reduction and Lightweight Construction for Combustion Engines
- 2012 Umicore (Belgium), for Recycling of NiMH and Li-ion batteries: a sustainable new business
- 2010 Zenergy Power GmbH and Bültmann GmbH (Germany), for Cutting energy consumption by 50% using magnetic billet heating based on superconductor technology
- 2008 CHOREN GmbH (Germany), for Sustainable production of synthetic biofuel (BTL) using the Carbo-V process

=== The International Business Cooperation Award ===
- 2018/19 EOSTA B.V. (Netherlands), for the "True Cost of Food” campaign which calculates and communicates the hidden costs of the food system
- 2016/17 Fairphone BV (Netherlands), for ethical electronics
- 2014/15 Interface Nederland BV (Netherlands), for Net-Works
- 2012 INENSUS GmbH (Germany), for MicroPowerEconomy – a Private Public Partnership model for comprehensive island-grid village electrification with renewable energy
- 2010 Ferrovial (Spain), for ‘Maji ni Uhai’ (Water is life). Water supply and sanitation in Serengueti District, Tanzania
- 2008 KIT (Royal Tropical Institute) Holding/Mali BioCarburant SA (Netherlands), for Sustainable Biodiesel Production in Mali

=== The Business and Biodiversity Award ===
- 2018/19 Suez Spain (Spain), for From water treatment plants to Biodiversity Reserves
- 2016/17 HiPP-Werk Georg Hipp OHG (Germany), for 20 Years of HiPP Sustainability Management
- 2014/15 Red Eléctrica de España, S.A.U. (Spain), for Birds and Electricity Transmission Lines: Mapping of Flight Paths
- 2012 Slovenské elektrárne, a.s. (Slovakia), for Energy for Nature: Saving most precious animal species in the Slovak mountains

== See also ==
- List of business awards
- List of environmental awards
