= Nathalie Katsonis =

Organic chemist

- Born: 22 February 1978 (age 48); Vienna, Austria
- Education: Chimie ParisTech; Pierre and Marie Curie University
- Known for: Bioinspired molecular systems
- Scientific career
- Workplaces: University of Groningen; University of Twente; Centre National de la Recherche Scientifique

Nathalie Helene Katsonis (born 22 February 1978 in Vienna, Austria) is a Professor of Active Molecular Systems at the Stratingh Institute for Chemistry, University of Groningen. In 2016 she was awarded the Royal Netherlands Chemical Society Gold Medal.

== Early life and education ==
Katsonis was born in Vienna. She grew up in Orsay, in Paris Region. She is half French and half Greek. She studied chemical engineering at the Chimie ParisTech, before moving to Ecole Normal Superieure for her graduate studies with Ludovic Jullien. Katsonis earned her doctoral degree at the Pierre and Marie Curie University. She worked on nanoscale probes of two dimensional molecular self-assemblies with Denis Fichou. She joined the research group of Ben Feringa at the University of Groningen, where she worked on self-assembly of motors and switches. Whilst at Groningen Katsonis developed scanning probe microscopy for the determination of molecular chirality.

== Research and career ==
Katsonis joined the Centre National de la Recherche Scientifique (CNRS) in 2007 and started to work on light-responsive chiral liquid crystals. She was made a Group Leader at the University of Groningen and held a visiting position at KU Leuven. In 2012 she was awarded a Royal Society International Exchange grant to work with Steve Fletcher on light responsive polymers. Katsonis proposed the materials could be used for microfluidics or soft robotics. Her research is inspired by nature, where helical structures are often created for movement.

She moved to the University of Twente in 2013, and was promoted to Professor in 2016. She returned to the University of Groningen as Professor of Active Molecular Systems in 2020. Katsonis has worked on squishy light responsive materials, which can convert light energy into mechanical work. She demonstrated that it is possible to switch between left and right-handed helixes in cholesteric liquid crystals using light. She has also showed that it is possible to use twisted liquid crystals as organising templates to design self-assemblies of superparamagnetic nanoparticles. In 2017 she was awarded a European Research Council Consolidator Grant in nanotechnology. Her recent work has been concerned with unravelling the molecular origin of purposeful motion, both in space and time at the nanoscale.

=== Awards and honours ===
Her awards and honours include;

- 2012 European Research Council Starting Grant
- 2012 University of Twente De Winter Prize
- 2014 Elected to the Royal Netherlands Academy of Arts and Sciences Young Academy
- 2016 Netherlands Organisation for Scientific Research Athena Award
- 2016 Elected a member of the Global Young Academy
- 2016 Elected to the Council for Physics and Chemistry
- 2017 Royal Netherlands Chemical Society Gold Medal
- 2018 European Research Council Consolidator Grant
- 2021 Elected member of the Royal Holland Society of Sciences and Humanities (KHMW)
- 2022 Professor Werdelmann Lectureship of the University of Duisburg-Essen
- 2024 Sauvage-Stoddart-Feringa Senior Prize for Molecular Machines
- 2025 The Ammodo Science Award

=== Selected publications ===
Her publications include;

- Eelkema, Rienk; Katsonis, Nathalie; Feringa, Ben (2006). "Molecular machines: nanomotor rotates microscale objects" (PDF). Nature. 440 (7081): 163. Bibcode:2006Natur.440..163E. doi:10.1038/440163a. PMID 16525460. S2CID 4384254.
- Kudernac, Tibor; Katsonis, Nathalie; Feringa, Ben (2011). "Electrically driven directional motion of a four-wheeled molecule on a metal surface". Nature. 479 (7372): 208–11. Bibcode:2011Natur.479..208K. doi:10.1038/nature10587. hdl:11370/9fad779e-2a93-4927-8750-7a197ecea952. PMID 22071765. S2CID 6175720.
- Katsonis, Nathalie; Kudernac, Tibor; Feringa, Ben (2006). "Reversible conductance switching of single diarylethenes on a gold surface". Advanced Materials. 18 (11): 1397–1400. Bibcode:2006AdM....18.1397K. doi:10.1002/adma.200600210. S2CID 94100738.
- Iamsaard, Supitchaya; Fletcher, Stephen; Katsonis, Nathalie (2014). "Conversion of light into macroscopic helical motion". Nature Chemistry. 6 (3): 229–35. Bibcode:2014NatCh...6..229I. doi:10.1038/nchem.1859. hdl:11370/dbe14fb1-8781-4ea6-b37a-db0e9aab0863. PMID 24557138. S2CID 205292584.
- Alexander Ryabchun, Federico Lancia, Nathalie Katsonis (2023). "Light‐Responsive Springs from Electropatterned Liquid Crystal Polymer Networks" Advanced Optical Materials. 11: 2300358. https://doi.org/10.1002/adom.202300358

=== Academic service ===
Katsonis serves on the Nature Travel Grants panel. She is an Editor of the journals Communications Chemistry and ChemPhotoChem.

== Personal life ==
Katsonis is in partnership with Tibor Kudernac and has three children.
