= Jacques Zeelen =

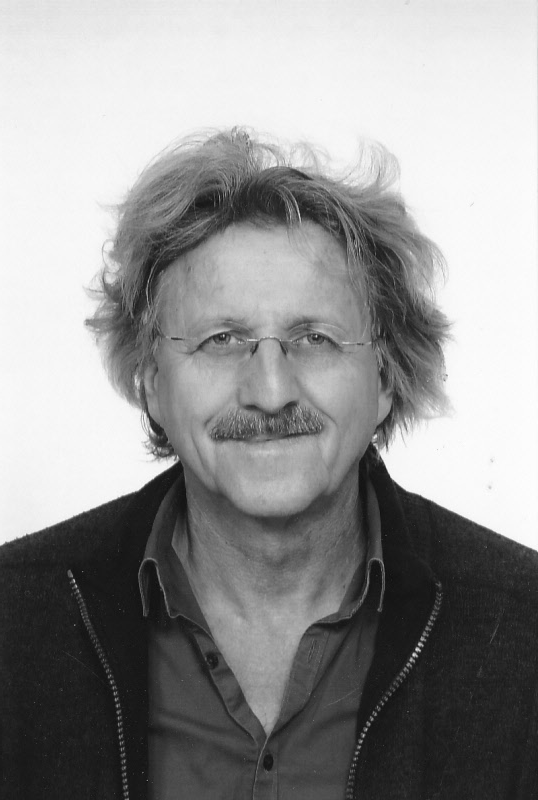
- Portrait Jacques Zeelen
- Born: 1951 (age 74–75)
- Education: University of Amsterdam, Free University Berlin
- Scientific career
- Fields: Social Sciences, Adult education, Andragogy, Development Cooperation, Mental Health
- Workplaces: University of Groningen

J.J.M. "Jacques" Zeelen (born 1951) is Professor of Lifelong Learning and Social Intervention in the Context of Globalisation at the Faculty of Arts, University of Groningen. Zeelen is also working as an associate professor at the department of Pedagogy, Faculty of Behavioural and Social Sciences of the same university. In 2016 Prof. Jacques Zeelen was appointed UNESCO Chair Lifelong Learning, Youth and Work, Gulu University Uganda.

== Work ==
With a background in psychology, Jacques Zeelen headed the research program 'Rehabilitation issues in mental health' in the 1980s and 1990s. After this he worked at the University of Limpopo in South Africa from 1998 to 2004. During this period he initiated the Early School Leaving in Africa (ESLA) project that aims at contributing to the combat of social exclusion of early school leavers in African countries. Due to the growing urgency around early school leaving and vocational education worldwide, this network was renamed Youth, Education and Work (YEW).

Among his current research areas are lifelong learning, social exclusion, action research, international development cooperation, professionalization in health care, social welfare and education. Zeelen's work is characterized by a combination of research and development, aiming at socially relevant research topics and methodology. Consistent with a research agenda tackling social exclusion, Zeelen proposes an action research approach to social research.
