= Cisca Wijmenga =

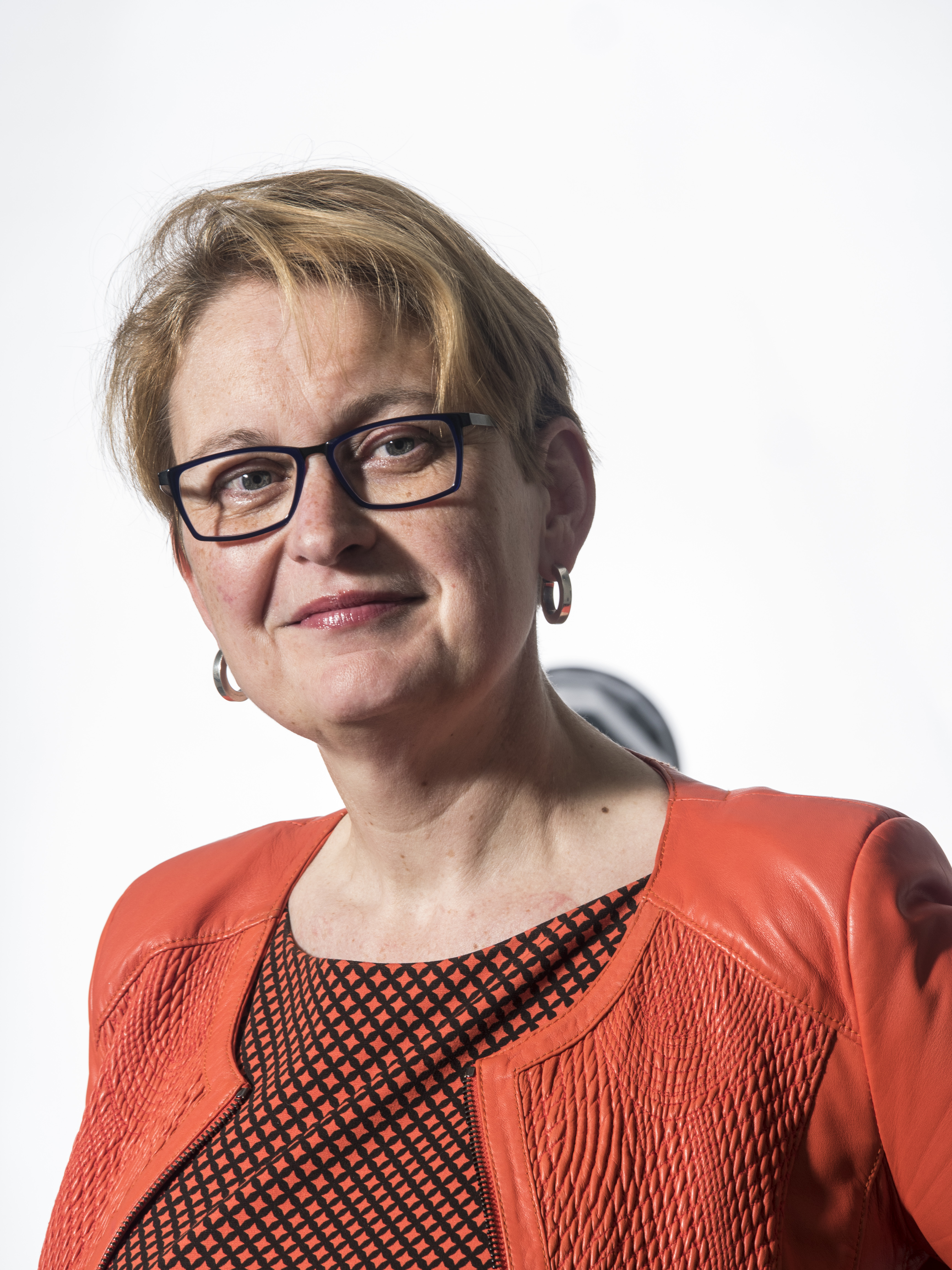
- Wijmenga in 2015
- Born: Tjitske Nienke Wijmenga; 16 February 1964 (age 62); Drachten, Netherlands
- Citizenship: Dutch
- Education: University of Groningen (B.S. in Biology); Leiden University (PhD)
- Known for: Research on coeliac disease and other autoimmune diseases
- Awards: Spinoza Prize
- Scientific career
- Fields: Human genetics
- Workplaces: University of Groningen
- Thesis: Facioscapulohumeral muscular dystrophy: from genetic mapping towards gene cloning (1993 Cum laude)
- Website: Personnel page of Cisca Wijmenga

Tjitske Nienke "Cisca" Wijmenga (born 16 February 1964) is a Dutch professor of Human Genetics at the University of Groningen and the University Medical Center Groningen. She was Rector Magnificus of the University between September 2019 and September 2023.

== Life ==
Wijmenga was born on 16 February 1964 in Drachten. She studied biology at the University of Groningen and obtained her PhD at Leiden University in 1993 with a thesis titled: "Facioscapulohumeral muscular dystrophy: from genetic mapping towards gene cloning". In 1999 she became a university lecturer of medical genetics at the University Medical Center Utrecht. In 2003 she became professor of human genetics at Utrecht University. In 2007 Wijmenga switched to the University of Groningen where she also became professor of human genetics.

She was appointed as Rector Magnificus of the University per September 2019, becoming the first female to hold the position. During her time in office she strived for more recognition of the education part of the university. In November 2022 she announced she did not aspire a second term for personal reasons. She was succeeded on 1 September 2023 by Jacquelien Scherpen.

== Awards and honours ==
Wijmenga was appointed a member of the Royal Netherlands Academy of Arts and Sciences in 2012. In 2013 she became a member of the Academia Europaea. In 2015 she was one of four winners of the Dutch Spinoza Prize, the highest Dutch distinction for academics working in the Netherlands. The award comprises €2.5 million. She was awarded the prize mainly for her research into the genetic factors associated with coeliac disease. She has also shown that several autoimmune diseases share common genetic factors. In 2018, she was awarded the United European Gastroenterology Research Prize of €100,000. In the same year she was made a Knight in the Order of the Netherlands Lion. In 2022 Wijmenga was elected a member of the European Molecular Biology Organization.
