= Albert Zwaveling =

Dutch surgeon (1927–2023)

- Born: 21 July 1927; Schoonebeek, Netherlands
- Died: 10 May 2023 (aged 95); Hoogmade, Netherlands
- Education: Leiden University Medical Center (PhD)
- Known for: Founder of surgical oncology in the Netherlands
- Scientific career
- Fields: Surgical oncology
- Workplaces: Leiden University Medical Center
- Thesis: Implantatie-metastasen : chemotherapeutische prophylaxe en groei in geïnfecteerd milieu (1960)

Albert Zwaveling (21 July 1927 – 10 May 2023) was a Dutch surgeon specialising in oncology, who worked as a professor at Leiden University between 1972 and 1992. He implemented chemotherapy in Dutch surgery and is considered to be one of the founders of surgical oncology in the Netherlands.

== Career ==
Albert Zwaveling was born on 21 July 1927 in Schoonebeek, in the province of Drenthe, the Netherlands. During his youth in World War II he was one of the first one the scene at the site of a shot down British De Havilland Mosquito at Nieuwlande on 29 September 1944 and made a cross of remembrance for the occupants. Zwaveling worked as a doctor on the island of Ternate in Indonesia before returning to the Netherlands. In July 1958 he started a surgical residency at the department of surgery of the Leiden University Medical Center under professor Maarten Vink. At the start of his studies there were limited treatment options for cancer, consisting of only surgery and radiation therapy.

In 1960 Zwaveling obtained his PhD at Leiden University on the subject of experimental chemotherapeutical treatment of implantation metastases with a thesis titled: Implantatie-metastasen : chemotherapeutische prophylaxe en groei in geïnfecteerd milieu. At the time, these were the first research papers on cancer chemotherapy in the Netherlands and led to the clinical implementation of chemotherapy in Dutch surgery. Vink and Zwaveling published the pivotal paper ‘Chancing Concepts in Cancer Surgery”in 1962. In addition to regular cancerchemotherapy isolated perfusion was introduced, followed by intra-arterial infusion two years later. In 1963 Zwaveling followed a one-year fellowship at the surgical department of the UW Health University Hospital in Madison, Wisconsin (USA) for one year to be familiarized with American surgical procedures and the use of chemotherapy in surgery. Zwaveling became a lector of surgery, specializing in clinical oncology, at Leiden University in 1968 and was appointed a full professor of surgical oncology in 1972. During the 1960s Zwaveling helped develop modern cancersurgery in the Netherlands and strengthened ties with other branches of medicine, including internal medicine.

In 1971, together with radiotherapist professor Piet Thomas and Emile van Slooten, surgeon at the Antoni van Leeuwenhoekziekenhuis, Zwaveling published the first breast cancer treatment protocol in the Netherlands. Moreover, in 1973 he initiated the first national multicenter randomized trial on adjuvant chemotherapy in breastcancer. Along with publishing scientific papers, he was actively involved in the training of students, residents and surgeons. For this purpose, Zwaveling wrote and co-edited multiple textbooks and educational articles. The textbook Oncology (co-edited with the sociologist R.van Zonneveld) appeared in 1973 and the first Dutch textbook of general surgery (Leerboek Chirurgie) was published in 1983. Because of these achievements Zwaveling is considered one of the founders of surgical oncology in the Netherlands, together with his colleagues professor Jan Oldhoff of the University Medical Center Groningen and Emile van Slooten. In 1981 their efforts led to the establishment of the “Dutch society of Surgical Oncology”, of which they became honorary members in 1991. In 1981 Zwaveling succeeded Vink as Head of the department of surgery in Leiden. His teaching assignment was then broadened to general surgery and the surgical oncology section came to be headed by professor Kees Welvaart and professor Cornelis van de Velde. Zwaveling retired from his clinical work in 1992. Until 2010 he worked as a medical adviser and interim manager and, in this context, advised on establishing the new specialism Technical Medicine at the University of Twente.

Zwaveling was elected a member of the Royal Netherlands Academy of Arts and Sciences in 1979. In 1992 he was made Knight in the Order of the Netherlands Lion.

== Death ==
Zwaveling died in Hoogmade on 10 May 2023, at the age of 95.
