= New Energy Business School =

Coordinates: 53.2401°N 6.5377°E

- Established: 2002, as Energy Delta Institute
- Location: Groningen, Netherlands
- Website: www.nebs.nl

New Energy Business School (NEBS), until 2022 called Energy Delta Institute (EDI) is an international energy business school, with a primary focus on natural gas. EDI was founded in 2002 by Gasunie, GasTerra, Gazprom and the University of Groningen, later joined by Royal Dutch Shell.

EDI coordinated research projects and organised training programmes with a focus on the economic, management, legal and geopolitical aspects of the energy business. In 2017 EDI merged with Energy Academy Europe and Energy Valley and became part of New Energy Coalition. In 2022 the school was rebranded as New Energy Business School.

In 2022 the collaboration with Gazprom was discontinued because of the Russian invasion of Ukraine.
