= Schoonebeek oil field =

Oilfield in Schoonebeek, Netherlands

Schoonebeek
- Country: Netherlands
- Region: Drenthe
- Offshore/onshore: onshore
- Operator: Royal Dutch Shell

Field history
- Discovery: 1943
- Start of development: 1943
- Start of production: 1947

Production
- Current production of oil: 300,000 barrels per day (~1.5×10^{7} t/a)
- Estimated oil in place: 133.8 million tonnes (~ 200×10^{6} m^{3} or 1000 million bbl)

The Schoonebeek oil field is an oil field located in Schoonebeek, Drenthe. It was discovered in 1943 and developed by Royal Dutch Shell. It began production in 1947 and produces oil. The total proven reserves of the Schoonebeek oil field are around 1 billion barrels (1.34×10^{8}tonnes), and production is centered on 300,000 barrels per day (48,000 m^{3}/d).
