= Sabeth Verpoorte =

Professor of microfluidics

Sabeth Verpoorte, Ph.D.
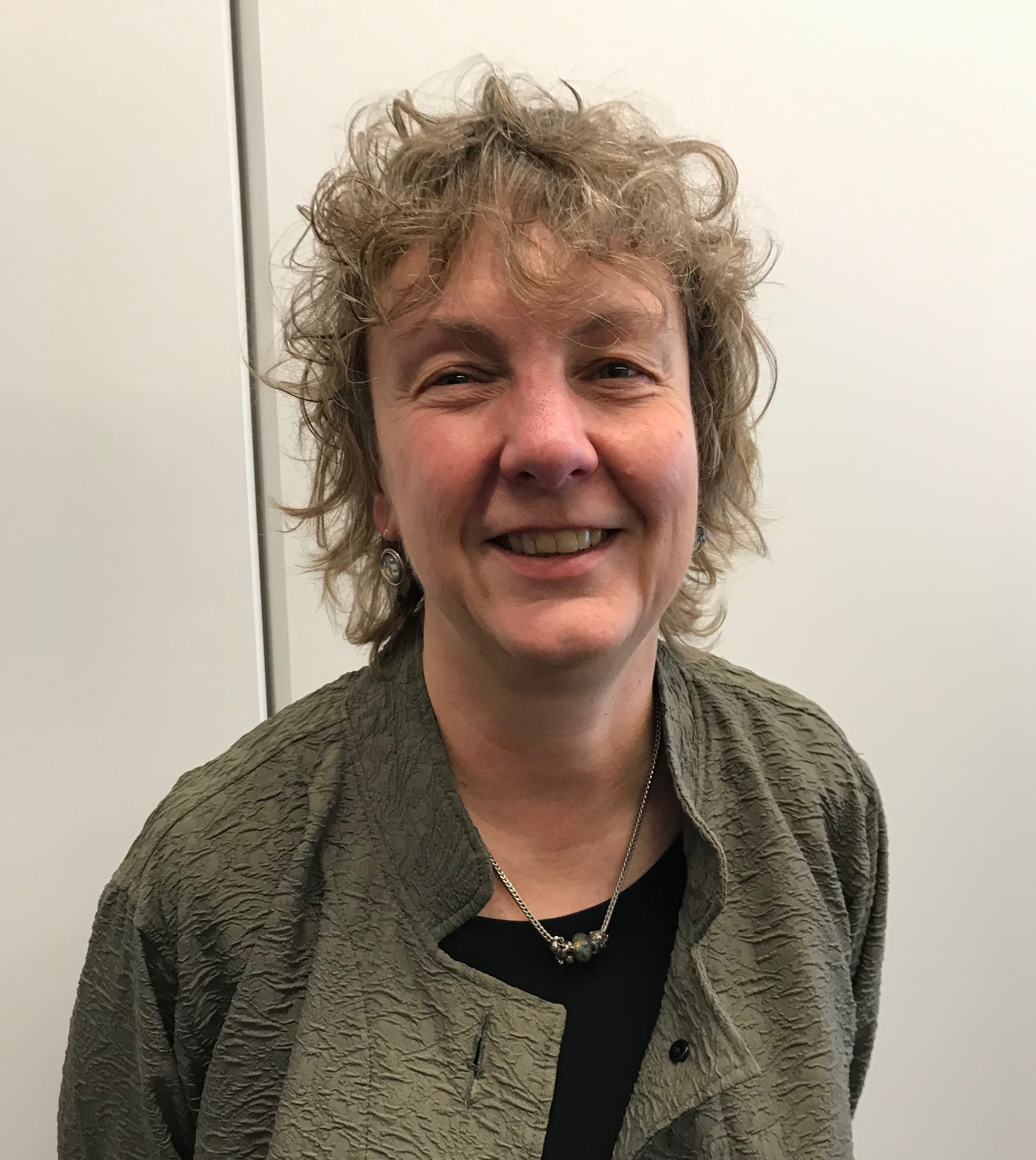
- Citizenship: Canadian
- Known for: Microfluidics, Lab-on-a-chip
- Website: https://www.rug.nl/staff/e.m.j.verpoorte/

Elisabeth MJ Verpoorte is a professor of microfluidics and miniaturized "lab-on-a-chip" systems in the Faculty of Science and Engineering at the University of Groningen, Netherlands.

== Education ==
Sabeth Verpoorte has over 30 years of experience in microfluidics and lab-on-a-chip technologies. She began her career in 1990 as a postdoctoral researcher in Professor Andreas Manz's pioneering lab-on-a-chip group at Ciba Ltd. in Basel, Switzerland. In 1996, she became a team leader under Professor Nico F. de Rooij at the Institute of Microtechnology, University of Neuchâtel, focusing on microfluidics for (bio)analytical applications. Since 2003, Verpoorte has held a chair at the Groningen Research Institute of Pharmacy (GRIP), University of Groningen, integrating microfluidic technology with pharmaceutical research. Her current projects include developing organ-on-a-chip systems to study drug metabolism, assessing organ interactions, and diagnose endothelial dysfunction. She also explores continuous-flow particle separation, paper microfluidics, and miniaturized analytical instrumentation. Verpoorte actively collaborates across disciplines and participates in international scientific organizations and editorial boards.

== Research ==
Sabeth Verpoorte's research focuses on microfluidic and lab-on-a-chip technologies for biomedical applications. She develops chemical detectors and separation modules on silicon dioxide chips, enabling miniaturized analytical processes that require fewer analytes, solutions, and cells.

Her work on electrokinetic control allows precise manipulation of substances in microfluidic systems, advancing drug discovery, biomarker detection, and personalized medicine. At the Groningen Research Institute of Pharmacy (GRIP), she also contributes to organ-on-a-chip models, which replicate human biological processes for improved drug testing and disease research.

== Volunteer activities ==
Sabeth Verpoorte was the 2018 President for the Society of Laboratory Automation and Screening. She has also held leadership roles in the Dutch Pharmacy Association and multiple international conferences.

== Honours and awards ==
Sabeth Verpoorte was recognized as an Honorary Doctor by Tampere University in recognition of her outstanding contributions to lab-on-a-chip and organ-on-a-chip research, as well as her long-standing interdisciplinary collaborations. The honorary doctorate was conferred as part of Tampere University's honorary doctorate laureate programme, which acknowledges world-class research and education focusing on technology, health, and society.
