= Eosta =

Dutch organic food company

Eosta B.V.
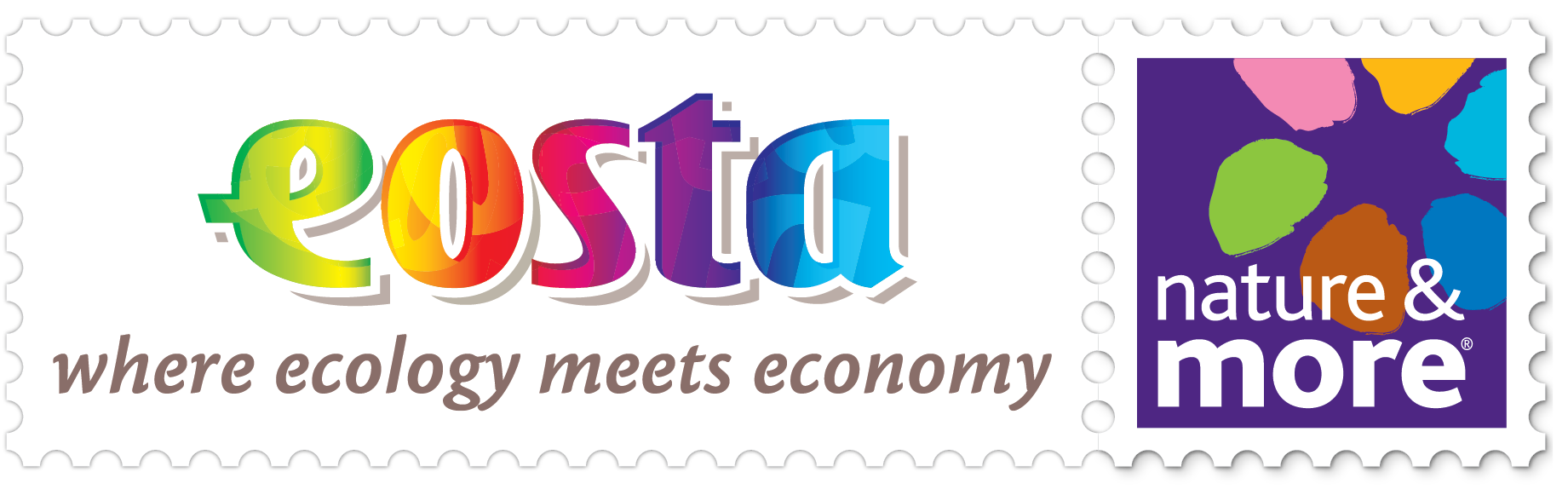

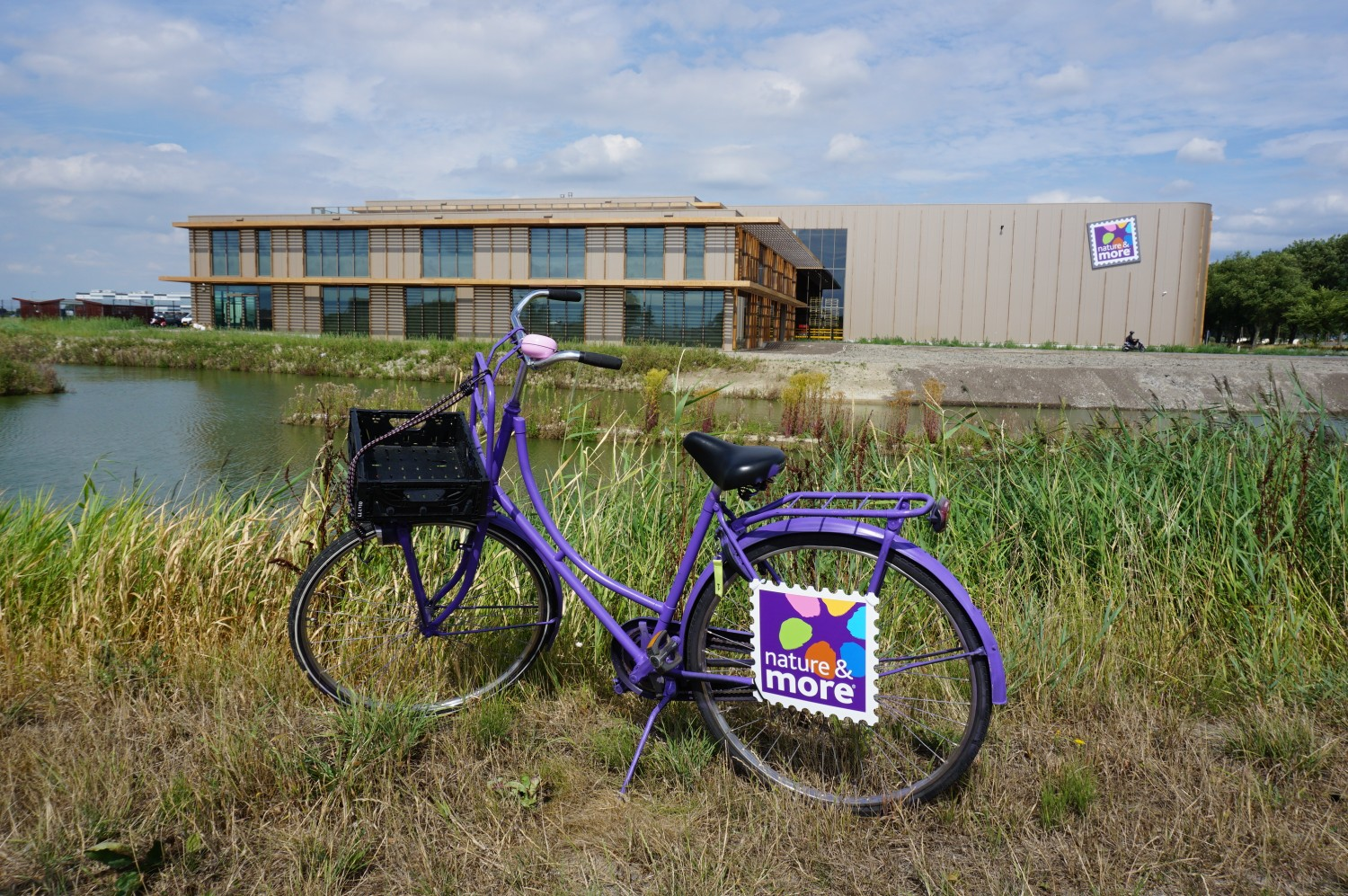
- Eosta's head office in the Netherlands
- Type: Multinational enterprise B.V.
- Industry: Food industry
- Founded: 1990; 36 years ago
- Founders: Volkert Engelsman
- Headquarters: Waddinxveen, Netherlands
- Key people: Volkert Engelsman (CEO)
- Products: Organic fruits and vegetables
- Revenue: ▲€100 million (2015)
- Net income: ▲€1.6 million (2015)
- Number of employees: 110 (2020)
- Website: www.eosta.com

Eosta is a Dutch company working in the field of organic food that is based in Waddinxveen. The company specializes in the import, export and distribution of fresh organic fruits and vegetables. Eosta imports overseas fruits from Africa, South America, Oceania, Asia and North America.

In 2017 Eosta's CEO, Volkert Engelsman, was elected Most Influential Sustainability Voice of the Netherlands in the yearly sustainability top-100 list by the newspaper Trouw, who called him "a greengrocer with a radical vision".

== Name ==
The name Eosta contains the Greek word "Eos", the goddess of sunrise.

== History ==
Eosta was founded in 1990 by Dutch entrepreneurs Volkert Engelsman and Willem van Wijk, in response to new rising demand in supermarkets for fresh organic food produce as well as the growth of the health food sector.

By 2007, the company had grown to be a major player in the European market for organic fruits and vegetables, exporting to Germany, the UK, Scandinavia, Belgium, France and other European countries, as well as the United States, Singapore and Hong Kong. In 2007 its subsidiary Soil & More Impacts was founded, as an agricultural consultancy enterprise.

== Transparency and Sustainability ==
Nature & More is a consumer trademark and online transparency system used by Eosta. Nature & More started out in 2004 as a nonprofit foundation, but was later integrated into the company. Products with the Nature & More brand carry a QR-code or a three-digit code, which buyers can enter on a website to access information about the organic grower behind the product. This allows them to inform themselves about the impact of the product on different aspects of ecological and social sustainability, which are measured by a GRI-based model called the Sustainability Flower. The transparency system won a Sustainable Entrepreneurship Award in Vienna, Austria, in 2013.

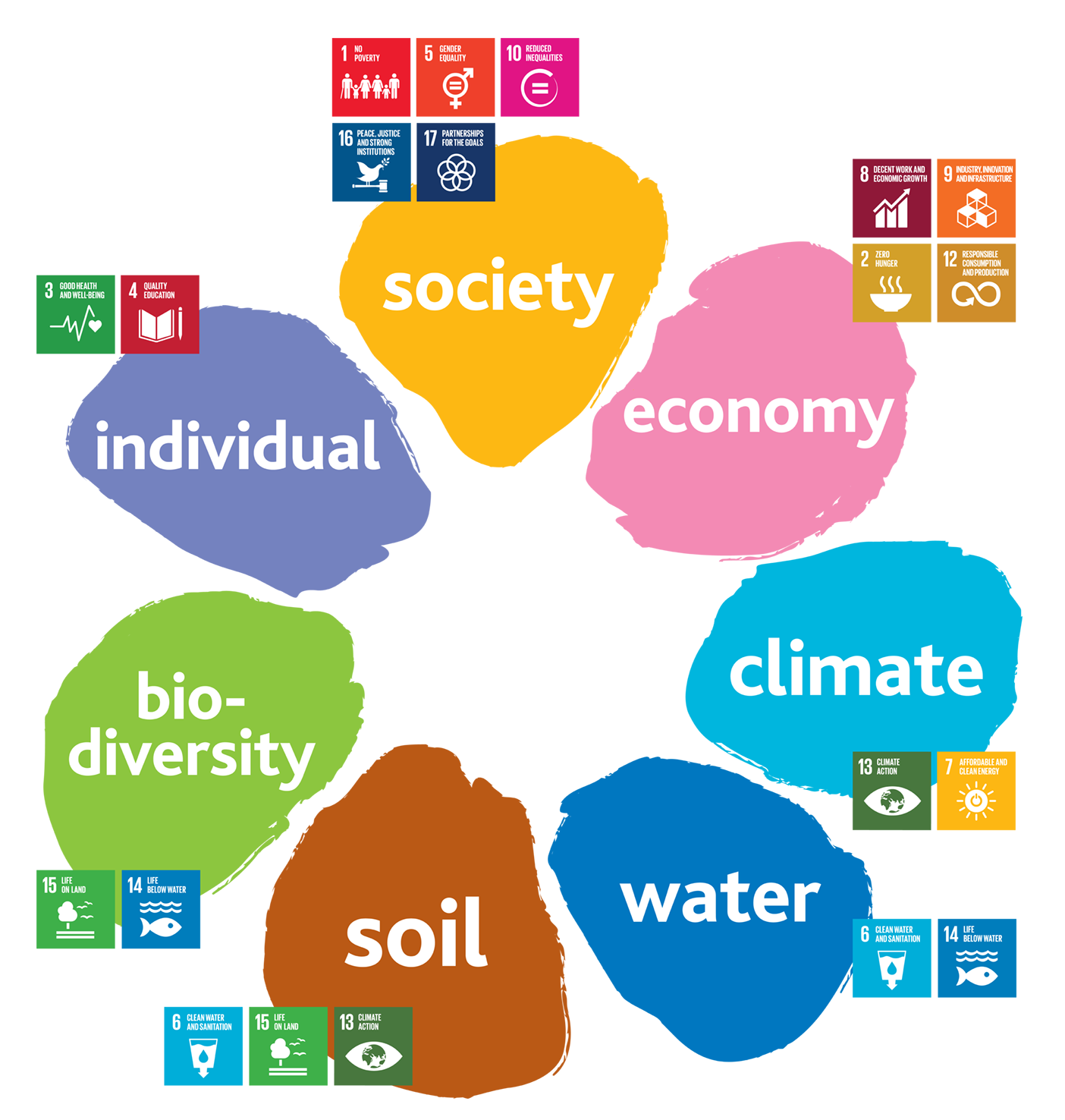
The Sustainability Flower, linked to the United Nations' Social Development Goals (SDGs)

The Sustainability Flower is the model for sustainability that Eosta uses to, as they say, "measure, manage, market and monetise" the impact of production on natural capital and social capital. The model was developed by an international group of companies and NGO's in 2009. Other companies in the organic field such as SEKEM (Egypt) and Soil & More Impacts (Germany) use the same model, but with a different graphic interpretation. Eosta's version of the Sustainability Flower has seven petals which each stand for a different aspect of ecological and social sustainability. These are evaluated quantitatively by Key Point Indicators based on GRI standards. The Sustainability Flower is used to assess the performance of organic farmers and growers. Subsequently, True Cost Accounting is used to put a monetary value on these impacts. According to Volker Engelsman, the company "[...] serves an awareness elite, people who are concerned about health, the environment, social issues. We don't try to compete with the lowest prices but to capitalize on the benefits of our growers – they are not just organic, but also socially and environmentally responsible."

== Campaigns and innovations ==
Eosta launched several innovations and campaigns in the field of sustainable food and packaging over the years. In 2018, Eosta won a European Business Award for the Environment for its True Cost of Food campaign, an awareness campaign about True Cost Accounting in food and agriculture. Another campaign in 2016 under the name "Natural Branding" introduced laser marking, whereby laser tattoos are applied to pieces of fruit and vegetables to reduce the use of plastic stickers and packaging materials. The Guardian reported on it.

== True Cost Accounting ==
In 2017 Eosta released a True Cost Accounting report on its impacts. The report, named "True Cost Accounting in Food, Farming and Finance" was presented to Prince Charles. Eosta's pilot calculated the impact costs of soil erosion and water pollution for several products, including organic apples from Argentina and organic oranges from South Africa. These numbers were compared with non-organic products. The report also included an integrated profit and loss statement for Eosta; one of the first to be published for a SME company worldwide. Eosta's CEO Volkert Engelsman said in Der Spiegel: "Apples in the supermarket for 99 cents per kilogram are not really a bargain, when the true costs for growing these apples are eventually put on the shoulders of the government and the tax payer." Experts at FAO estimate the hidden environmental costs of worldwide food production at 1900 billion Euro per year.

== Controversy ==
In 2016 Eosta's CEO, Volkert Engelsman, accused Dutch supermarkets, specifically Albert Heijn, of "criminal behaviour" in the Dutch financial daily paper Het Financieele Dagblad. Engelsman said: "Many supermarkets do not pay a realistic price to growers. By doing so, they avert health costs and environmental costs and put them on the shoulders of society. Academics call this a systemic failure, I call it criminal." Albert Heijn commented that it did not recognize itself in the description and would set up a meeting with Engelsman.
