= Jacquelien Scherpen =

Dutch control theorist

Jacquelien Maria Aleida Scherpen is a Dutch applied mathematician specializing in nonlinear control theory. She is a professor in the faculty of science and engineering at the University of Groningen, director of the Groningen Engineering Center, and former scientific director of the Engineering and Technology Institute Groningen (ENTEG). She has been rector magnificus of the university since September 2023.

== Education and career ==
Scherpen was born and raised in Schoonebeek. Subsequently she studied applied mathematics at the University of Twente, earning a master's degree in 1990 and completing her Ph.D. in 1994. Her doctoral dissertation, Balancing for Nonlinear Systems, was jointly promoted by Huibert Kwakernaak and Arjan van der Schaft.

She was affiliated with the Delft University of Technology from 1994 until 2006, when she moved to her present position at the University of Groningen. She was scientific director of ENTEG from 2013 to 2019, and has directed the Groningen Engineering Center since 2016.

On 1 September 2023 she became rector magnificus of the university, succeeding Cisca Wijmenga.

== Recognition ==
Scherpen was named an IEEE Fellow in 2021 "for contributions to nonlinear model reduction and passivity-based control". She is also a knight of the Order of the Netherlands Lion. In 2022, she was elected Chair of the Society for Industrial and Applied Mathematics Activity Group on Control and Systems Theory (SIAM SIAG/CST).
