= Systems chemistry =

Study of networks of interacting molecules and their emergent properties

Systems chemistry is the science of studying networks of interacting molecules, to create new functions from a set (or library) of molecules with different hierarchical levels and emergent properties.

Systems chemistry is also related to the origin of life (abiogenesis).

== Relations to systems biology ==
Systems chemistry is a relatively young sub-discipline of chemistry, where the focus does not lie on the individual chemical components but rather on the overall network of interacting molecules and on their emergent properties. Hence, it combines the classical knowledge of chemistry (structure, reactions and interactions of molecules) together with a systems approach inspired by systems biology and systems science.

== Examples ==
Dynamic combinatorial chemistry has been used as a method to develop ligands for biomolecules and receptors for small molecules.

Ligands that can recognize biomolecules are being identified by preparing libraries of potential ligands in the presence of a target biomacromolecule. This is relevant for application as biosensors for fast monitoring of imbalances and illnesses and therapeutic agents.

Individual components of certain chemical system will self-assemble to form receptors which are complementary to target molecule. In principle, the preferred library members will be selected and amplified based on the strongest interactions between the template and products.

== Molecular networks and equilibrium ==
A fundamental difference exists between chemistry as it is performed in most laboratories and chemistry as it occurs in life. Laboratory processes are mostly designed such that the (closed) system goes thermodynamically downhill; i.e. the product state is of lower Gibbs free energy, yielding stable molecules that can be isolated and stored. Yet the chemistry of life operates in a very different way: most molecules from which living systems are constituted are turned over continuously and are not necessarily thermodynamically stable. Nevertheless, living systems can be stable, but in a homeostatic sense. Such homeostatic (open) systems are far-from-equilibrium and are dissipative: they need energy to maintain themselves. In dissipative controlled systems the continuous supply of energy allows a continuous transition between different supramolecular states, where systems with unexpected properties may be discovered. One of the grand challenges of Systems Chemistry is to unveil complex reactions networks, where molecules continuously consume energy to perform specific functions.

== History ==
While multicomponent reactions have been studied for centuries, the idea of deliberately analyzing mixtures and reaction networks is more recent. The first mentions of systems chemistry as a field date from 2005. Early adopters focused on prebiotic chemistry combined with supramolecular chemistry, before it was generalized to the study of emergent properties and functions of any complex molecular systems. A 2017 review in the field of systems chemistry described the state of the art as out-of-equilibrium self-assembly, fuelled molecular motion, chemical networks in compartments and oscillating reactions.
