= List of language acquisition researchers =

Below are some notable researchers in language acquisition listed by intellectual orientation and research topic.

Nativists

- Eric Lenneberg
- Steven Pinker
- Stephen Crain
- Thomas Bever
- Susan Gelman
- Susan Carey
- Elizabeth Spelke
- Lila R. Gleitman

Empiricists

- Elizabeth Bates
- Michael Tomasello
- Brian MacWhinney
- Elissa L. Newport
- Linda B. Smith
- Jenny Saffran
- Elena Lieven
- Dan Slobin
- Barbara Landau
- Melissa Bowerman
- Adele Goldberg
- Richard N. Aslin
- Janet Werker
- Roger Brown
- LouAnn Gerken
- Jean Berko Gleason
- Edward Klima
- Ursula Bellugi
- Gary Marcus
- Paul Bloom
- Eve V. Clark

Generative Language Acquisition

- Lydia White
- Luigi Rizzi
- Thomas Bever
- Nina Hyams
- Rosemarie Tracy
- Maria Teresa Guasti

Second language acquisition researchers

- H. Douglas Brown
- Martin Bygate
- John Bissell Carroll
- Pit Corder
- Alister Cumming
- Nick Ellis
- Rod Ellis
- Susan Gass
- Fred Genesee
- François Grosjean
- Luke Harding
- Keith Johnson
- Judit Kormos
- Stephen Krashen
- Judith F. Kroll
- Alison Mackey
- Rosa Manchón
- Paul Kei Matsuda
- Lourdes Ortega
- Teresa Pica
- Paul Pimsleur
- Richard Schmidt
- Norbert Schmitt
- Larry Selinker
- Merrill Swain
- Elaine Tarone
- Jyotsna Vaid
- Bill VanPatten
- Lydia White
- Alison Wray
- Michael T. Ullman

Complex Dynamic Systems Theory approach

- Kees de Bot
- Marijn van Dijk
- Zoltán Dörnyei
- Paul van Geert
- Nick Ellis
- Diane Larsen-Freeman
- Wander Lowie
- Sarah Mercer
- Marjolijn Verspoor
