= Kathleen Bardovi-Harlig =

American linguist

- Born: 10 November 1955 (age 70); Los Angeles, California, U.S.
- Known for: Second language acquisition; Second language writing
- Awards: Distinguished Research Award (1999)

Academic background
- Education: California State University, Northridge; University of Chicago
- Thesis: A functional approach to English sentence stress (1983)

Academic work
- Discipline: Linguist
- Sub-discipline: Second language acquisition; Second language temporality; Tense-mood-aspect systems; Interlanguage pragmatics; Second language writing
- Institutions: Indiana University (Bloomington)
- Doctoral students: Scott Jarvis
- Website: Bardovi-Harlig on the website of Indiana University

Kathleen Bardovi-Harlig is an American linguist. She is currently Provost Professor and ESL Coordinator at Indiana University (Bloomington).

== Education and research ==
She obtained her Bachelor of Arts degree in Linguistics in 1976 and a Master of Arts degree in Linguistics in 1978 at the California State University, Northridge. She earned her PhD in linguistics from the University of Chicago in 1983, with a dissertation entitled, A Functional Approach to English Sentence Stress.

Her primary research interests are second-language temporality and tense-mood-aspect systems and interlanguage pragmatics.

Bardovi-Harlig is credited for the creation of the Coordination Index (CI) which was published in the TESOL Quarterly in 1992 and since then has been considered as the only reliable measure of coordination.

== Awards and honors ==
- 1999: TESOL- Newbury House Distinguished Research Award (with co-author: Zoltán Dörnyei) for "Do language learners recognize pragmatic violations? Pragmatic vs. grammatical awareness in instructed L2 learning." TESOL Quarterly, 32, 233-259. Original video task can be found at: https://www.iub.edu/~celtie/pedagogy/bardovi_harlig/scenes_from_school.html
- Professor Bardovi-Harlig served as president of the American Association for Applied Linguistics (AAAL) from 2007 to 2008.

== Selected publications ==
=== Books ===
- Bardovi-Harlig, K. (2000). Tense and aspect in second language acquisition: Form, meaning, and use. Oxford: Blackwell.
- Bardovi-Harlig, K., & Hartford, B. (Eds.) (2005). Interlanguage Pragmatics: Exploring Institutional Talk. Mahwah, NJ: Erlbaum.
- Bardovi-Harlig, K., & Mahan-Taylor, R. (2003). Teaching Pragmatics. Washington, DC: United States Department of State.
- Bardovi-Harlig, K. (2012). Second language acquisition. In R. Binnick (Ed.) Handbook of tense and aspect (pp. 481–503). Oxford: Oxford University Press.
- Bardovi-Harlig, K. (2012). Pragmatics in SLA. In S. M. Gass & A. Mackey (Eds.) The Routledge handbook of second language acquisition (pp. 147–162). London: Routledge/Taylor Francis.

=== Articles ===
- Bardovi-Harlig, K (1992). "A second look at T-unit analysis: Reconsidering the sentence". TESOL Quarterly. 26 (2): 390–395. doi:10.2307/3587016. JSTOR 3587016.
- Bardovi-Harlig, K (1992). "The use of adverbials and natural order in the development of temporal expression". IRAL. 30 (4): 299–320. doi:10.1515/iral.1992.30.4.299. S2CID 143062291.
- Bardovi-Harlig, K (1992). "The relationship of form and meaning: A cross-sectional study of tense and aspect in the interlanguage of learners of English as a second language". Applied Psycholinguistics. 13 (3): 253–278. doi:10.1017/s0142716400005634. S2CID 145180362.
- Bardovi-Harlig, K.; Hartford, B. S. (1993). "Learning the rules of academic talk: A longitudinal study of pragmatic development". Studies in Second Language Acquisition. 15: 279–304. doi:10.1017/s0272263100012122. S2CID 145791251.
- Bardovi-Harlig, K (1994). "Reverse-order reports and the acquisition of tense: Beyond the principle of chronological order". Language Learning. 44 (2): 243–282. doi:10.1111/j.1467-1770.1994.tb01102.x.
- Bardovi-Harlig, K.; Reynolds, D. W. (1995). "The role of lexical aspect in the acquisition of tense and aspect". TESOL Quarterly. 29 (1): 107–131. doi:10.2307/3587807. JSTOR 3587807.
- Bardovi-Harlig, K (1995). "A narrative perspective on the development of the tense/aspect system in second language acquisition". Studies in Second Language Acquisition. 17 (2): 263–291. doi:10.1017/s0272263100014182. S2CID 146666967.
- Bardovi-Harlig, K.; Hartford, B. S. (1996). "Input in an institutional setting". Studies in Second Language Acquisition. 18 (2): 171–188. doi:10.1017/s027226310001487x. S2CID 143825644.
- Bardovi-Harlig, K.; Bergström, A. (1996). "The acquisition of tense and aspect in SLA and FLL: A study of learner narratives in English (SL) and French (FL)". Canadian Modern Language Review. 52: 308–330. doi:10.3138/cmlr.52.2.308.
- Bardovi-Harlig, K (1997b). "Assessing grammatical development in interactional contexts". TESOL Quarterly. 31 (4): 797–806. doi:10.2307/3587764. JSTOR 3587764.
- Bardovi-Harlig, K (1997). "Another piece of the puzzle: The emergence of the present perfect". Language Learning. 47 (3): 375–422. doi:10.1111/0023-8333.00015.
- Bardovi-Harlig, K.; Dörnyei, Z. (1998). "Do language learners recognize pragmatic violations? Pragmatic vs. grammatical awareness in instructed L2 learning". TESOL Quarterly. 32: 233–259. doi:10.2307/3587583. JSTOR 3587583.
- Bardovi-Harlig, K (1998). "Narrative structure and lexical aspect: Conspiring factors in second language acquisition of tense-aspect morphology". Studies in Second Language Acquisition. 20: 471–508. doi:10.1017/s0272263198004021. S2CID 145523926.
- Bardovi-Harlig, K (1999). "Exploring the interlanguage of interlanguage pragmatics: A research agenda for acquisitional pragmatics". Language Learning. 49 (4): 677–713. doi:10.1111/0023-8333.00105.
- Bardovi-Harlig, K (1999). "From morpheme studies to temporal semantics: Tense-aspect research in SLA. State of the art article". Studies in Second Language Acquisition. 21 (3): 341–382. doi:10.1017/s0272263199003010. S2CID 145704718.
- Bardovi-Harlig, K (2002). "A New Starting Point? Investigating Formulaic Use and Input". Studies in Second Language Acquisition. 24: 189–198. doi:10.1017/s0272263102002036. S2CID 142889443.
- Bardovi-Harlig, K.; Griffin, R. (2005). "L2 Pragmatic Awareness: Evidence from the ESL Classroom". System. 33 (3): 401–415. doi:10.1016/j.system.2005.06.004.
- Wulff, S.; Ellis, N. C.; Römer, U.; Bardovi-Harlig, K.; LeBlanc, C. J. (2009). "The acquisition of tense-aspect: Converging evidence from corpora, cognition, and learner constructions". Modern Language Journal. 93: 336–369. doi:10.1111/j.1540-4781.2009.00895.x. hdl:2027.42/75534.
- Bardovi-Harlig, K.; Stringer, D. (2010). "Variables in second language attrition: Advancing the state of the art". Studies in Second Language Acquisition. 32: 1–45. doi:10.1017/s0272263109990246. S2CID 145433687.
- Bardovi-Harlig, K.; Vellenga, H. E. (2012). "The effect of instruction on conventional expressions in L2 pragmatics". System. 40: 77–89. doi:10.1016/j.system.2012.01.004.
- Bardovi-Harlig, K (2012). "Formulas, routines, and conventional expressions in pragmatics research". Annual Review of Applied Linguistics. 32: 206–227. doi:10.1017/s0267190512000086. S2CID 145063710.
- Bardovi-Harlig, K. (2013). Developing L2 pragmatics. Language Learning, 63:Suppl.1, 68–86.
- Bardovi-Harlig, K (2014). "Awareness of meaning of conventional expressions in second language pragmatics". Language Awareness. 23 (1–2): 41–56. doi:10.1080/09658416.2013.863894. S2CID 144082474.
- Bardovi-Harlig, K.; Mossman, S.; Vellenga, H. E. (2015). "The effect of instruction on pragmatic routines in academic discussion". Language Teaching Research. 19 (3): 324–350. doi:10.1177/1362168814541739. S2CID 56292731.
- Bardovi-Harlig, K (2015). "Disinvitations: You're not invited to my birthday party!". Journal of Pragmatics. 75: 91–110. doi:10.1016/j.pragma.2014.10.010.
- Bardovi-Harlig, K.; Stringer, D. (2017). "Unconventional expressions: Productive syntax in the L2 acquisition of formulaic language". Second Language Research. 33: 61–90. doi:10.1177/0267658316641725. S2CID 26479253.
- Bardovi-Harlig, K.; Su, Y. (2018). "The acquisition of conventional expressions as a pragmalinguistic resource in Chinese as a foreign language". Modern Language Journal. 102 (4): 732–757. doi:10.1111/modl.12517. S2CID 149527078.
- Bardovi-Harlig, K (2019). "Invitations as request-for-service mitigators in academic discourse". Journal of Pragmatics. 139: 64–78. doi:10.1016/j.pragma.2018.10.005. S2CID 150155195.
