= Richard F. Young =

British-born American applied linguist

- Born: October 15, 1948 (age 78); Bushey, Hertfordshire, England
- Known for: Interactional competence Discursive practice theory in language learning

Academic background
- Education: University of Oxford; University of Reading; University of Pennsylvania

Academic work
- Institutions: University of Wisconsin–Madison
- Notable works: Discursive Practice in Language Learning and Teaching (2009)

Richard Frederick Young (born 15 October 1948) is a British-born American applied linguist and professor of English linguistics and second-language acquisition at the University of Wisconsin–Madison. He is known for his work on interactional competence and discursive practice as frameworks for understanding second-language acquisition, teaching, and assessment.

== Early life and education ==
Young was born on 15 October 1948 in Bushey, Hertfordshire. On 5 April 1949 he was adopted and raised by Richard William Young and Edith Young of Acton, West London. He graduated from the University of Oxford with a degree in philosophy, politics, and economics. He taught at the University of Turin before earning an M.A. in applied linguistics from the University of Reading. He worked with the British Council in Hong Kong as Materials and Methodology Officer and settled in the United States in 1983. He received a Ph.D. in educational linguistics from the University of Pennsylvania in 1989.

== Career ==
Young joined the faculty of the University of Wisconsin–Madison in 1993 as Professor of English Linguistics and second-language acquisition. He retired in 2019 and was granted emeritus status. His research focuses on applied linguistics, linguistic anthropology, oral second language assessment, and classroom discourse.

== Research and contributions ==
Young’s scholarship examines the relationship between language use and social context in second-language acquisition. He has developed the concept of interactional competence - the co-constructed ability to participate effectively in face-to-face interaction - and a theory of discursive practice drawing on sociolinguistics, conversation analysis, and sociocultural theory.

In a 2019 chapter titled “Interactional competence and L2 pragmatics” in The Routledge Handbook of Second Language Acquisition and Pragmatics, Young examined the relationship between interactional competence and pragmatics.

His 2009 monograph Discursive Practice in Language Learning and Teaching (Wiley-Blackwell) has been described by reviewers as a comprehensive synthesis of his ideas on discursive practice and interactional competence. His earlier monograph Variation in Interlanguage Morphology (1991) applied multivariate quantitative methods to the analysis of learner language variation.

His chapter “Interactional competence in language learning, teaching, and testing” (2011, in the Handbook of Research in Second Language Teaching and Learning) has been referenced in studies on language learning and assessment. He also served as a consultant to the Educational Testing Service (ETS) on the major redesign of the TOEFL test.

== Leadership roles ==
Young served as President of the American Association for Applied Linguistics (AAAL) for the 2005–2006 term and chaired the 14th World Congress of Applied Linguistics (AILA 2005) in Madison, Wisconsin. He was General Editor of the Language Learning Monograph Series and has served on the editorial boards of several leading journals, including Studies in Second Language Acquisition, Language Learning, and the Journal of Applied Linguistics.

== Personal life ==
Young has lived in Italy, Hong Kong, and China. In 2024, he published Chronology of Desire, a collection of poetry, prose, and reflections.

== Selected publications ==
=== Books ===
- Young, Richard F. (1991). Variation in Interlanguage Morphology. New York: Peter Lang. Focus: An early, foundational text examining how second-language learners systematically vary their grammatical and morphological structures as they develop a new language.
- Young, Richard F.; He, Agnes Weiyun (1998). Talking and Testing: Discourse Approaches to the Assessment of Oral Proficiency. Amsterdam/Philadelphia: John Benjamins. Focus: A critical volume examining the interactional mechanics of Language Proficiency Interviews (LPIs), bringing discourse analysis and conversation analysis directly into language assessment frameworks.
- Young, Richard F. (2008). Language and Interaction: An Advanced Resource Book. London & New York: Routledge. ISBN 978-0-415-38553-4. Focus: A comprehensive textbook and resource that outlines the major themes, questions, and structural layers of language treated as social interaction.
- Young, Richard F. (2009). Discursive Practice in Language Learning and Teaching. Malden, MA: Wiley-Blackwell. ISBN 978-1-4051-8444-1. Focus: This landmark text details his framework for "Discursive Practice Theory," arguing that language learning is fundamentally a social phenomenon and that interactional competence is co-constructed by all participants within specific cultural contexts.

=== Refereed articles and chapters ===
- Young, Richard F. (2017). "World languages, world Englishes and local identities". World Englishes. 36 (4): 488–508.
- Young, Richard F. (2018). Habits of mind: How do we know what we know?. Palgrave Macmillan. pp. 41–53.
- Hulstijn, J. H.; Young, R. F.; Ortega, L.; et al. (2014). "Bridging the gap: Cognitive and social approaches to research in second language learning and teaching". Studies in Second Language Acquisition. 36 (3): 361–421.
- Young, R. F.; Astarita, A. C. (2013). "Practice theory in language learning". Language Learning. 63 (Supplement 1): 171–189.
- Young, R. F. (2012). Social dimensions of language testing (1st ed.). Routledge. pp. 178–193.
- Young, R. F. (2012). Qualitative research. Routledge. pp. 536–539.
- Young, R. F. (2011). Interactional competence in language learning, teaching, and testing. Vol. 2. Routledge. pp. 426–443.
- Garrett, P.; Young, R. F. (2009). "Theorizing affect in foreign language learning: An analysis of one learner's responses to a communicative-based Portuguese course". The Modern Language Journal. 93 (2): 209–226.
- Young, R. F.; Miller, E. R. (2004). "Learning as changing participation: Discourse roles in ESL writing conferences". The Modern Language Journal. 88 (4): 519–535.
- Young, R. F.; Lee, J. (2004). "Identifying units in interaction: Reactive tokens in Korean and English conversations". Journal of Sociolinguistics. 8 (3): 380–407.
- Young, R. F.; Nguyen, H. T. (2002). "Modes of meaning in high school science". Applied Linguistics. 23 (3): 348–372.
- Young, R. F. (2002). "Discourse approaches to oral language assessment". Annual Review of Applied Linguistics. 22: 243–262.
