= Kenneth W. Mildenberger Prize =

Annual prize awarded by the Modern Language Association

The Kenneth W. Mildenberger Prize is an annual prize given to a language translator by the Modern Language Association.

== Eligibility ==
The 2017 prize will be awarded for a book published in 2015 or 2016.

== Notable winners ==
Past winners of the prize include:

Year	Linguist	Institution	Research output	Publisher
2015-16	Erin Kearney	University at Buffalo, State University of New York	Intercultural Learning in Modern Language Education: Expanding Meaning-Making Potentials	Multilingual Matters, 2016
2015-16	Rod Ellis	Curtin University	Understanding Second Language Acquisition, 2nd ed.	Oxford University Press, 2015 (Honorable mention)
2013-14	James Lantolf; Matthew Poehner	Penn State University	Sociocultural Theory and the Pedagogical Imperative in L2 Education: Vygotskian Praxis and the Research/Practice Divide	Routledge, 2014
2011-12	Susan Gass; Alison Mackey	Michigan State University; Georgetown University	The Routledge Handbook of Second Language Acquisition	Routledge, 2012
2010	Norman Segalowitz	Concordia University	Cognitive Bases of Second Language Fluency	Routledge, 2010
2009	Claire Kramsch	University of California, Berkeley	The Multilingual Subject: What Foreign Language Learners Say about Their Experience and Why It Matters	Oxford University Press, 2009
2008	Diane Larsen-Freeman; Lynne Cameron	University of Michigan; Open University	Complex Systems and Applied Linguistics	Oxford University Press, 2008
2007	B. Kumaravadivelu	San José State University	Cultural Globalization and Language Education	Yale University Press, 2007
2006	Penny McKay	Queensland University of Technology	Assessing Young Language Learners	Cambridge University Press, 2006
2005	Cristina Sanz	Georgetown University	Mind and Context in Adult Second Language Acquisition: Methods, Theory, and Practice	Georgetown University Press, 2005
2004	Paul Seedhouse	University of Newcastle upon Tyne	The Interactional Architecture of the Language Classroom: A Conversation Analysis Perspective	Blackwell, 2004
2003	Janina Brutt-Griffler	University of York	World English: A Study of Its Development	Multilingual Matters, 2003
2003	Ken Hyland	University of London	Second Language Writing	Cambridge University Press, 2003 (Honorable mention)
2000	Hossein Nassaji; Gordon Wells	Centennial College; University of California, Santa Cruz	What's the Use of 'Triadic Dialogue'? An Investigation of Teacher-Student Interaction	Applied Linguistics 21.3
1999	Guy Cook	University of Reading	Language Play, Language	Oxford University Press, 1999
1998	Richard Clément; Zoltán Dörnyei; Peter Macintyre; Kimberly Noels	University of Nottingham	"Conceptualizing Willingness to Communicate in a L2: A Situational Model of L2 Confidence and Affiliation"	The Modern Language Journal, Winter 1998
1997	Peter Skehan	Thames Valley University	A Cognitive Approach to Language Learning	Oxford University Press, 1997
1996	Lyle F. Bachman; Adrian S. Palmer	University of California, Los Angeles; University of Utah	Language Testing in Practice	Oxford University Press, 1996
