= Alison Mackey =

Linguist

- Known for: Second language acquisition; Task-based language learning; Research Methodology
- Awards: Condé Nast Award, Georgetown College of Arts and Sciences (2025), International Task-Based Language Teaching and Learning Association's Distinguished Achievement award (2023), American Association for Applied Linguistics's Distinguished Scholarship and Service Award (2022), Georgetown University's Presidential Scholar-Teacher Award (2019), Georgetown's Provost’s Career Research Award (2019), Kenneth W. Mildenberger Prize (2016)

Academic work
- Discipline: Linguist
- Sub-discipline: Second language acquisition
- Institutions: Georgetown University; Lancaster University (summer)
- Doctoral students: Paula Winke
- Website: Mackey on the website of Georgetown University

Alison Mackey is a linguist who specializes in applied linguistics, second language acquisition and research methodology and is one of the most highly cited scholars in the world in these areas.

== Career ==
Since 1998, Alison Mackey has been a professor at Georgetown University. Since 2012 she has been a researcher during the summers in the Department of Linguistics and English Language at Lancaster University where she now holds the title of Distinguished Professor. Since 2020 Mackey has been Chair of the Department of Linguistics at Georgetown and co-Director of the grant-funded Assessment and Evaluation Language Research Center.

From 2014-2025, Alison Mackey was the Editor-in-Chief of the Cambridge University Press journal, Annual Review of Applied Linguistics.

Since 2014, Mackey has been a co-founder of IRIS (the Instruments for Second Language Research digital repository).

Since 2000, Mackey has been a series editor of the Routledge Second Language Acquisition Research series and since 2015 of the accompanying Taylor and Francis Handbooks in SLA series.

=== Work for a general audience ===
Mackey has published two articles in The Guardian, one suggesting that different types and levels of motivation might be one key to second language learning, and a cognitively-oriented follow-up piece on What happens in the brain when you learn a language?.

Mackey has published a book for a general audience, The Bilingual Edge: Why, when and how to teach a child second language (HarperCollins, with Kendall King).

== Research ==
Mackey's most cited book is "Second language research: methodology and design" (with Susan M. Gass) and her most cited journal article is Conversational Interaction and Second Language Development: Recasts, Responses, and Red Herrings? (with Jenefer Philp), published in The Modern Language Journal in 1998. One of her most important contributions to the research methodology area is her second most highly cited book "Stimulated recall methodology in second language research," which established this data collection approach as a key part of the second language research area.

== Publications ==
Mackey has publications in all of the major applied linguistics research journals, including Studies in Second Language Acquisition, The Modern Language Journal, Language Teaching Research, Applied Linguistics, System, TESOL Quarterly, the AILA Review, Language Learning, and International Review of Applied Linguistics in Language Teaching, amongst others. She has published books with Oxford University Press, Cambridge University Press, Routledge, Taylor and Francis, John Benjamins, Wiley-Blackwell and Lawrence Erlbaum.

== Awards ==
- 2016: Kenneth W. Mildenberger Prize (with Susan Gass)
- 2019: Georgetown's Provost’s Career Research Award
- 2019: Georgetown University's Presidential Scholar-Teacher Award
- 2022: American Association for Applied Linguistics's Distinguished Scholarship and Service Award
- 2023: International Task-Based Language Teaching and Learning Association's Distinguished Achievement award
- 2025: Condé Nast Award, Georgetown College of Arts and Sciences.

== Bibliography ==
=== Books ===
- Bryfonski, L. & Mackey, A. (2024). The art and science of language teaching. Cambridge University Press
- Mackey, A., & Gass, S. M. (Eds.). (2023). Current approaches in second language acquisition research: A practical guide. Wiley Blackwell.
- Mackey, A. & Gass, S. M. (2021) Second language research: Methodology and design (3rd ed.). Routledge.
- Mackey, A. (2020). Interaction, Feedback and Task Research in L2 Learning: Methods and Design. Cambridge University Press.
- Culpeper, J., Mackey, A. & Taguchi, N. (2018). Second language pragmatics: From theory to research. Routledge. (Nominated for the 2019 AAAL book award)
- Gass, S.M., & Mackey, A. (2017). Stimulated Recall Methodology in Applied Linguistics and L2 Research. Routledge.
- Mackey, A., & Marsden, E. (Eds.). (2016). Instruments for research into second language. Taylor and Francis.

=== Journal articles ===
- Mackey, A., Bryfonski, L., Ku, Y. (2024). Research methods for IDs and TBLT: A methodological review.
- Mackey, A., Cook, K. L., & Fell, E. (in press). Open Science and research materials. In L. Plonsky (Ed.), Open science in applied linguistics. John Benjamins.
- Mackey, A. & Bryfonski, L. (2022). Output in language learning: Why it’s important and ways to promote it in person and online. Elements Journal.
- Mackey, A., Fell, E., de Jesus, F., Hall, A., & Ku, Y. Y. (2022). Social justice in applied linguistics: Making space for new approaches and new voices. Annual Review of Applied Linguistics, 42, 1–10.
- Mackey, A., Gass, S. M., Fell, E., & Sagdic, A. (2022). The interaction approach and individual differences factors in SLA. In S. Li (Ed.), The Routledge handbook of second language acquisition and individual differences (pp. 13–14). Routledge.
- Doughty, C. J. & Mackey, A. (2021). Language aptitude: Multiple perspectives. Annual Review of Applied Linguistics, 40, 1–5.
