= Martin Bygate =

British linguist

- Born: 22 May 1948 (age 78); Cambridge, United Kingdom
- Known for: Tandem language learning; Task-based language learning; Pedagogical grammar

Academic background
- Education: Leicester University

Academic work
- Discipline: Linguist
- Sub-discipline: Tandem language learning; Task-based language learning; Pedagogical grammar
- Institutions: Federal University of Santa Catarina, Brazil; University of Reading; University of Leeds; Hong Kong Institute of Education; Lancaster University
- Website: Bygate on the website of Lancaster University

Martin Bygate (born 1948) is a British linguist. He is currently an honorary professor at the Department of Linguistics and English Language of Lancaster University, United Kingdom. His research focuses on applied linguistics with a special focus on tandem language learning, pedagogical grammar and task-based language learning.

== Career ==
Bygate was a lecturer at the Federal University of Santa Catarina, Brazil from 1979-1983, the University of Reading between 1986 and 1994 and at the University of Leeds between 1994 and 2003. He was an Advisory Professor to the English Department of Hong Kong Institute of Education between 2003 and 2004.

Between 1989 and 1995 Bygate served as the British Association for Applied Linguistics (BAAL) Meetings Secretary and the Publications Secretary between 1988 and 1989. Between 2006 and 2009 he was the coordinator of the BAAL 'Language Learning and Teaching' Special Interest Group.

Between 1998 and 2004 Bygate served as the co-editor for the Applied Linguistics and he has been a member of the editorial boards of Applied Linguistics, Language Teaching Research, and Language Teaching.

In September 2003 he was appointed as a Professor of Applied Linguistics and Language Education at the Department of Linguistics and English Language at Lancaster University.

In 2008 he was elected as a President of AILA (Association Internationale de Linguistique Appliquee), International Association of Applied Linguistics in English, for a 3-year term.

On 9 June 2011, Bygate gave a plenary at Sorbonne Nouvelle conference in Paris.

In 2011 Bygate presided over the 16th AILA World Congress in Beijing, China.

== Research ==
Bygate argued that the most significant trend in applied linguistics is the emergence of the field as a generic discipline, involving several subareas, all characterised by the aim of developing theoretical and empirical studies of language as a key element in real world problems.

Bygate brought together a wide-ranging set of papers, each from a quite distinct area of applied linguistics in article published in Applied Linguistics.

Bygate in an article, published in The Language Learning Journal, provided an outline of the origins, the current shape and the potential directions of task-based language teaching (TBLT) as an approach to language pedagogy.

== Publications ==
Bygate has publications in several major journals such as Applied Linguistics, AILA Review, and The Language Learning Journal.

== Bibliography ==
=== Books ===
- Bygate, M., Van den Branden, K. (Ed.), Bygate, M. (Ed.), & Norris, J. (Ed.) (2009). Task-based language teaching : a reader. (Task-Based Language Teaching). Amsterdam: John Benjamins Publishers.
- Samuda, V., & Bygate, M. (2008). Tasks in second language learning. (Research and practice in applied linguistics). Basingstoke: Palgrave Macmillan.

=== Articles ===
- Bygate, M. (2004). Some current trends in applied linguistics: towards a generic view. AILA Review, 17(1), 6–22. doi:
- Bygate, M. (2005). Applied linguistics: a pragmatic discipline? A generic discipline? Applied Linguistics, 26(4), 568–581. doi:
- Bygate, M. (2016). Sources, developments and directions of task-based language teaching. Language Learning Journal, 44(4), 381–400. doi:
