= Susan Gass =

American linguist

- Born: May 21, 1943 (age 83); Boston, Massachusetts, United States
- Known for: Second language acquisition; Input and interaction; Language universals; Language transfer
- Awards: 2016: Kenneth W. Mildenberger Prize

Academic background
- Education: University of California, Berkeley (BA); Middlebury College (MA); University of California, Los Angeles (MA); Indiana University Bloomington (PhD)
- Thesis: An investigation of syntactic transfer in adult second language acquisition (1979)

Academic work
- Discipline: Linguist
- Sub-discipline: Second language acquisition; Input and interaction; Language universals; Language transfer
- Institutions: Michigan State University
- Website: Gass on the website of Michigan State University

Susan M. Gass (born 1943) is an American linguist who has won the Kenneth W. Mildenberger Prize. She is currently a professor emerita, retired from the Department of Linguistics, Languages, and Cultures at Michigan State University. Her research focuses on applied linguistics with a special focus on second language learning, corrective feedback, and task-based language learning. She graduated in 1961 from Kingswood School Cranbrook.

== Career ==
Gass served as the director of the English Language Center, co-director of the Center for Language Education And Research (CLEAR), co-director of the Center for Language Teaching Advancement (CeLTA), and founding-director of the Second Language Studies (SLS) Ph.D. program at Michigan State University.

Between 2002 and 2008 she served as president of the International Association of Applied Linguistics.

She was the editor of Studies in Second Language Acquisition.

== Research ==
According to Google Scholar, Gass's most cited publications include: Second language acquisition: An introductory course, Second language research: Methodology and design, and Input, interaction, and the second language learner.

One of her major publications is a journal article, published in Applied Linguistics in 1985, entitled Non-native/Non-native Conversations: A Model for Negotiation of Meaning. The article, co-written with Evangeline Varonis, builds on the research focusing on conversational interactions between native speakers and non-native speakers. The paper focuses on interactions among non-native speakers of English. Varonis and Gass noted that negotiation of meaning was the most common among non-native speaker/non-native speaker pairs.

== Publications ==
Gass has had work published in several major journals such as Applied Linguistics, Studies in Second Language Acquisition, Language Learning, The Modern Language Journal, and AILA Review.

She has co-written books with Larry Selinker, Alison Mackey, Charlene Polio, and Bill VanPatten.

== Awards ==
Gass has received numerous outstanding awards throughout her career.

- 1995: MSU Outstanding Research Award, Golden Key Honor Society, 1995
- 1996: Paul Pimsleur Award for Outstanding Research, ACTFL (American Council for the Teaching of Foreign Languages).
- 1998: Ralph Smuckler Award for advancing international studies and programs, Michigan State University Michigan Association of Governing Boards Award
- 2002: Distinguished Scholarship and Service (American Association for Applied Linguistics)
- 2012: Language Learning Outstanding article (with Luke Plonsky)
- 2016: Kenneth W. Mildenberger Prize (with Alison Mackey

== Bibliography ==
=== Books ===
- Gass, S. M., Madden, C. G., Conference on Applied Linguistics, & University of Michigan. (1985). Input in second language acquisition. Cambridge, Massachusetts: Newbury House.
- Gass, S. M., & Selinker, L. (1994). Language transfer in language learning. Amsterdam: John Benjamins.
- Gass, S. M., & Mackey, A. (2000). Stimulated recall methodology in second language research. Mahwah, NJ: Lawrence Erlbaum Associates.
- Mackey, A., & Gass, S. M. (2005). Second language research: methodology and design. Mahwah, New Jersery: Lawrence Erlbaum Associates.
- Gass, S. M., & Mackey, A. (2007). Data elicitation for second and foreign language research. Mahwah, New Jersey Lawrence Erlbaum Associates.
- Gass, S. M., Mackey, A., & Polio, C. (2011). Multiple perspectives on interaction: Second language research in honor of Susan M. Gass. New York, New York: Routledge.
- Gass, S. M., & Mackey, A. (Eds.) (2012). The Routledge handbook of second language acquisition. London: Routledge.
- Mackey, A., & Gass, S. M. (Eds.) (2012). Research methods in second language acquisition: a practical guide. Chichester: Wiley Blackwell.
- Gass, S. M. (2013). Second Language Acquisition: An Introductory Course. Hoboken: Taylor and Francis.
- Gass, S. M., Selinker, L., & Sorace, A. (2013). Second language learning data analysis: Teacher's manual.

=== Articles ===
- Varonis, E. M., & Gass, S. (1985). Non-native/Non-native Conversations: A Model for Negotiation of Meaning, Applied Linguistics, 6(1), pages 71–90, doi:
