= Paula Winke =

American linguist

- Awards: TESOL Award for Distinguished Research (2012); AAAL Research Article Award (2020); Paul Pimsleur Award (2021); ILTA Best Article Award (2025)

Academic background
- Education: University of Wisconsin–Madison (BA); University of Minnesota (MA); Georgetown University (PhD)
- Doctoral advisor: Alison Mackey

Academic work
- Discipline: Applied linguistics, language assessment
- Institutions: Michigan State University
- Doctoral students: Amy S. Thompson

Paula Marie Winke is an American linguist specializing in the educational assessment and learning of additional languages.

== Education ==
Winke holds a doctorate in linguistics from Georgetown University, a Master of Arts in linguistics from the University of Minnesota, Minneapolis, and a Bachelor of Arts in French and philosophy from the University of Wisconsin-Madison. While at Madison, she lived in the French House and studied abroad at Université Laval in Quebec City and Université d'Aix-Marseille in Aix-en-Provence. Her doctoral dissertation, "Individual differences in adult Chinese second language acquisition: The relationship among aptitude, memory and strategies for learning," was funded by a U.S. National Science Foundation Doctoral Dissertation Research grant. She collected the data at the Defense Language Institute Foreign Language Center in Monterey, California under the supervision of John Lett and Gordon L. Jackson. Her dissertation advisor was Alison Mackey.

== Career ==
Winke spent two years as an au pair for the daughter of Kim Kashkashian and Manfred Eicher while studying German and linguistics at the Albert Ludwig University of Freiburg, then joined the U.S. Peace Corps in 1998. As a volunteer, she trained English teachers at Leshan Normal University. After the Peace Corps, she worked as a research assistant and test development project manager at the Center for Applied Linguistics in Washington, D.C., and then joined the faculty of Michigan State University in August 2005.

Winke directed MSU's Master of Arts in Foreign Language Teaching program from 2013 to 2016. In 2014, she received a Language Proficiency Grant from the Defense Language and National Security Education Office, renewed twice for a total of five years. In 2018, she joined an 18-month National Academies of Sciences, Engineering, and Medicine committee evaluating approaches to foreign language proficiency assessment for the State Department's Foreign Service Institute. From 2019 to 2024, she served as co-editor of Language Testing. She was named director of second language studies at MSU in 2020 and appointed to the university's inaugural Arts & Letters Professorship in 2023. In 2024, she was elected treasurer of the American Association for Applied Linguistics.

In 2024–2025, Winke was a visiting scholar and guest professor at the University of Innsbruck. She has been a Fulbright Scholar twice: at the Budapest University of Technology and Economics in 2008 and at the University of Leipzig in 2020.

== Awards ==
- 2009: Outstanding Article Award, CALICO Journal
- 2012: TESOL Award for Distinguished Research, TESOL International Association
- 2020: The American Association for Applied Linguistics (AAAL) Research Article Award
- 2021: Paul Pimsleur Award for Research in World Language Education, co-sponsored by the National Federation of Modern Language Teachers Associations (NFMLTA) and The Modern Language Journal
- 2025: The International Language Testing Association (ILTA) Best Article Award for a 2023 publication in the field of language testing and assessment
