= Interaction hypothesis =

Idea that second-language acquisition is helped by face-to-face communication

In psycholinguistics, the interaction hypothesis is a theory of second-language acquisition which states that the development of language proficiency is promoted by face-to-face interaction and communication. Its main focus is on the role of input, interaction, and output in second language acquisition. It posits that the level of language that a learner is exposed to must be such that the learner is able to comprehend it, and that a learner modifying their speech so as to make it comprehensible facilitates their ability to acquire the language in question. The idea existed in the 1980s, and has been reviewed and expanded upon by a number of other scholars but is usually credited to American psycholinguist Michael Long.

== Outline ==
The interaction hypothesis states that (1) Comprehensible input is a requirement for second language acquisition, and (2) Input is made comprehensible to the learner via negotiations for meaning in conversations. Later responses, i.e. from Teresa Pica, also include a third pillar stating that (3) participation in tasks in which communication is necessary and in which participants share a symmetrical role relationship promote more opportunities for meaning negotiation.

Similar to Krashen's input hypothesis, the interaction hypothesis claims that comprehensible input, which is characterized as a variety of language that can be understood by a learner, is important for language learning. There are a number of ways in which input may be modified for the benefit of the learner. For example, a native speaker of a language may use foreigner talk when addressing a non-native speaker: this kind of modified input entails slowed speech, greater articulation, and simplified vocabulary. In addition, it claims that the effectiveness of comprehensible input is greatly increased when learners have to negotiate for meaning. This occurs when there is a breakdown in communication which interlocutors attempt to overcome. One of the participants in a conversation will say something that the other does not understand; the participants will then use various communicative strategies to help the interaction progress. Many different strategies may be employed by interlocutors: for example, they may request for clarification (e.g. "What do you mean?") or provide a comprehension check (e.g. "Do you know what I mean?"). Negotiation strategies such as clarification requests, confirmation checks, recasts (rephrasing an incorrect sentence with the correct structure), and comprehension checks are considered implicit feedback, while corrections and metalinguistic explanations are explicit feedback. The difference between modified interaction and modified input is that in the latter, participants may engage with one another and their communication is dynamic, whereas in the former the information given to the learner is static and is not open for interaction. As a result, the interactional structure of a two-way conversation or task then elicits the most modifications since the dynamic aspect forces the participants to negotiate for meaning.

Interactions provide a context for learners to receive feedback on the correctness or incorrectness of their language use. Interactions often result in learners receiving negative evidence. That is, if learners say something that their interlocutors do not understand or that is ungrammatical, after negotiation the interlocutors may model the correct language form. Conversely, positive evidence is confirmation that what a learner has said is grammatical. In doing this, learners can receive feedback on their production and on grammar that they have not yet mastered. Individual differences may also affect negative feedback and its effectiveness when each learner has their own preferences for types of negative feedback. The process of interaction may also result in learners receiving more input from their interlocutors than they would otherwise. Furthermore, if learners stop to clarify things that they do not understand, they may have more time to process the input they receive. This can lead to better understanding and possibly the acquisition of new language forms. Finally, interactions may serve as a way of focusing learners' attention on a difference between their knowledge of the target language and the reality of what they are hearing; it may also focus their attention on a part of the target language of which they are not yet aware. A drawback is that in simplifying the input to make it comprehensible, modification takes away from the acquisition of complex structures.

== Primacy of interaction ==
Although there are several studies that link interaction with language acquisition, not all researchers subscribe to the idea that interaction is the primary means by which language proficiency develops. In a survey of the literature on the subject, Larsen-Freeman and Long say that interaction is not necessary for language acquisition; they do say, however, that it helps in certain circumstances. Gass and Selinker claim that as well as interaction facilitating learning, it may also function as a priming device, "setting the stage" for learning rather than being the means by which learning takes place. In addition, Ellis notes that interaction is not always positive. He says that sometimes it can make the input more complicated, or produce amounts of input which overwhelm learners. According to Ellis, this can happen if interlocutors use lengthy paraphrases or give complex definitions of a word that was not understood, and he comes to the conclusion that the role of interaction in language acquisition is a complex one. This conclusion is mirrored in Stephen Krashen's work, in his description of the affective filter. This phenomenon occurs when learners are given information too far beyond their own level of comprehension which then causes them to disengage with the L2 producing an inhibitory "filter" of information.

== Historical development ==
=== Stephen Krashen ===
In his 1980 work The Input Hypothesis, Stephen Krashen proposes that second language acquisition only occurs when the learner is exposed to comprehensible input that is just beyond their current level of understanding. This input hypothesis is characterized as i + 1, in which i represents the learner's current language level and + 1 represents the following level of language acquisition. Evidence to support this claim comes in the form of speech that is modified for a learner's benefit, such as foreigner talk and teacher talk, in which speech is slowed or simplified for ease of listener comprehension. This hypothesis provided the groundwork that would later be further developed by Michael Long, to whom the interaction hypothesis is most closely associated.

=== Michael Long ===
Michael Long first developed the interaction hypothesis in his 1981 work titled "Input, interaction, and second-language acquisition". In this paper, based on indirect evidence, he proposes that modified input and modified interaction when combined facilitate second language acquisition more efficiently than other alternatives (e.g. modified input but unmodified interaction). In this work, similar to Krashen, Long believes comprehensible input to be a crucial factor in second language acquisition and that a lack of it will lead to little or no language acquisition at all. His views on comprehensible input later changed in his 1989 work titled "Task, group, and task-group interactions" in that comprehensible input may not be sufficient.

In his 1996 work most closely associated with the formal interaction hypothesis, "The role of linguistic environment in second language acquisition", Long describes the kind of positive and negative evidence supplied by interlocutors during negotiations of meaning that can facilitate second language acquisition. Indirect evidence from past studies concerning L1 acquisition and sociolinguistic characteristics of non-native speakers are used to support the theory. Along with the influence of Krashen's work concerning the input hypothesis, Long's interaction hypothesis was partly influenced by Evelyn Marcussen Hatch's 1978 work on interaction and discourse analysis. Like Hatch, he notes that interaction can develop acquisition by guiding their production. This idea that negotiating for meaning when there is a breakdown in communication is beneficial to language development is also tied to Merrill Swain's 1985 comprehensible output hypothesis which argues that the demands of negotiating ways to express output in a comprehensible manner for the interlocutor aids learners in their second language development. The revised version of the interaction hypothesis that is shown in Long's 1996 paper places more emphasis on noticing and corrective feedback. Negotiation of meaning is shown to encourage the process of noticing.

Interaction is beneficial for second language acquisition because it also gives the learner opportunities to use production through conversations.

=== Teresa Pica ===
In her 1987 work in collaboration with Richard Young and Catherine Doughty titled "The Impact of Interaction on Comprehension" Teresa Pica describes two kinds of linguistic environments in to which the interaction hypothesis applies: in which input is modified for the learner's comprehension, as found in instructional settings; and in which both conversation participants modify their own output so as to make themselves understood (i.e. when they both negotiate meaning) as found in naturalistic settings. According to the interaction hypothesis, the second environment leads to greater engagement with the language and thus leads to greater learner acquisition.

In her 1987 work "Second-language acquisition, social interaction, and the classroom" Teresa Pica also posits that interactions including negotiations of meaning between a teacher and a student may not be as effective for the acquisition of a second language due to the imbalance of the teacher-student relationship. An example of this imbalance is students refraining from making clarification requests in effort to avoid their being perceived as challenging the teacher's knowledge. Rather, interactions between students are thought to be more effective since their relationship to one another is equal. Thus, she submits that an additional third pillar of the core hypothesis must be added: that in addition to the requirement for (1) comprehensible input and (2) negotiation of meaning, (3) interlocutor relationship balance and shared communicative goals is also required for more effective second language acquisition.

Pica also explains that negotiations of meaning do not always elicit the modification result that is expected or intended from the learner. Some modifications in negotiation do not prompt the same kinds of modifications. A confirmation check is less likely to cause a learner to modify their sentence than a clarification request because they only have to confirm with a simple answer instead of elaborate and restructure their response for clarity.

=== Rod Ellis ===
In his 1991 work titled "The Interaction Hypothesis: A Critical Evaluation", Rod Ellis discusses Long's version of the interaction hypothesis and proposed some revisions based on studies and other academic interpretations of the hypothesis that were available at the time. Notably, he introduces a revised version of the hypothesis, which is characterized as: (1) Comprehensible input is useful for learners but is neither necessary nor sufficient for L2 acquisition; (2) Acquisition is made possible via input modifications (i.e. negotiation of meaning) but only if the learners both comprehend the input and are able to adopt differences into their own output; (3) Interaction situations that force learners to modify their output promotes their L2 learning. This revision is based on the lack of direct evidence supporting the original hypothesis, but that indirect evidence is nonetheless adequate to maintain some level of the theory. Additionally, this revision would allow the theory to be tested empirically, since it more clearly defines the relationship between acquisition, comprehension, and input.

Ellis's later 2008 work titled The study of second language acquisition relates the newer version of the interaction hypothesis to Focus-on-Form instruction which uses a communicative task with a focus on meaning to bring attention to form.

== Limitations and criticisms ==
Earlier versions of the interaction hypothesis, particularly those of Krashen and Long, argue that comprehensible input is both necessary and sufficient for language development, but further research has provided evidence that comprehensible input is in fact not sufficient for second language acquisition by itself. Comprehensible input may in some cases hinder learning because learners may be able to understand the meaning of a sentence without realizing that they do not understand all of the individual components such as lexical or grammatical items.

If input is simplified too much in order to become comprehensible, there may no longer be new complex features for the learner to notice. The learner may also focus too much on the meaning of the sentence that they have no leftover mental resources to pay attention to the linguistic features. The reasoning of when and how interactional modifications facilitate comprehension is not yet fully understood and requires more research. Rather than complete abandonment, revision of the hypothesis is proposed.

Negotiation may not be as effective for beginner learners as it is for intermediate learners because beginners may not have the language knowledge needed for negotiation.

== See also ==
- Dynamic approach to second language development
