= Guy Cook =

Guy W. D. Cook (born 10 October 1951) is an applied linguist. As of 2023, he is Emeritus Professor of Language in Education at King's College London in the UK. He was Chair of the British Association for Applied Linguistics from 2009–2012 and Chair Mentor from 2012–2013. He teaches and writes about English language teaching, literary stylistics, discourse analysis, advertising, and the language of food politics.

He is known for three strands of research:

- on language teaching, where he has argued for a return to the use of translation and bilingual methods, and for a move away from what he considers to be dull functional approaches
- on language play and creativity, not only in literature and genres such as advertising, but as a phenomenon which permeates language use, bringing with it educational, social, and cognitive benefits
- on the language of food politics, in particular genetically modified (GM) and organic food, where he has shown how the campaign for GM crops and food is in his belief unscientific, driven by partisan interests, and characterised by bullying tactics, irrational arguments, and emotive language.

== Career ==
Cook is a graduate of the University of Cambridge, where he read English. He holds a master's degree and a Ph.D. from the University of London. He worked initially as a language teacher in the UK, Egypt, Italy, and the Soviet Union, before beginning his academic career in 1985. He was a lecturer at the University of Leeds 1985–1991, head of Modern Languages and TESOL at the London University Institute of Education 1991–1998, Professor of Applied Linguistics at the University of Reading 1998–2004, and Professor of Language and Education at The Open University 2005–2012. He was co-editor of the journal Applied Linguistics from 2004 to 2009.

== Bibliography ==
- Cook, Guy (2010). Translation in Language Teaching: An Argument for Reassessment. Oxford: Oxford University Press. ISBN 978-0-19-442475-2.
- Cook, Guy (2004). Genetically Modified Language: the discourse of arguments for GM crops and food. London: Routledge. ISBN 978-0-415-31468-8.
- Cook, Guy (2003). Applied Linguistics. Oxford Introductions to Language Study. Oxford: Oxford University Press. ISBN 978-0-19-437598-6.
- Cook, Guy (2001). The Discourse of Advertising. London: Routledge. ISBN 978-0-415-23455-9.
- Cook, Guy (2000). Language Play, Language Learning. Oxford: Oxford University Press. ISBN 978-0-19-442153-9. - winner of the Modern Languages Association Kenneth Mildenberger Prize "for an outstanding research publication in the field of foreign languages and literatures"; shortlisted for the International House Ben Warren Prize.
- Cook, Guy (1994). Discourse and Literature: the interplay of form and mind. Oxford: Oxford University Press. ISBN 978-0-19-437185-8.
- Cook, Guy (1989). Discourse. Language Teaching: A Scheme for Teacher Education. Oxford: Oxford University Press. ISBN 978-0-19-437140-7.
- Cook, Guy; North, Sarah, eds. (2009). Applied Linguistics in Action: a reader. London: Routledge. ISBN 978-0-415-54546-4.
- Cook, Guy, ed. (2008). The Language of Advertising (4 volumes). London: Routledge.
