= AAAL =

AAAL may refer to:

- American Association for Applied Linguistics
- Arthritis-attributable activity limitation, in the epidemiology of arthritis
