= Diane Larsen-Freeman =

American linguist

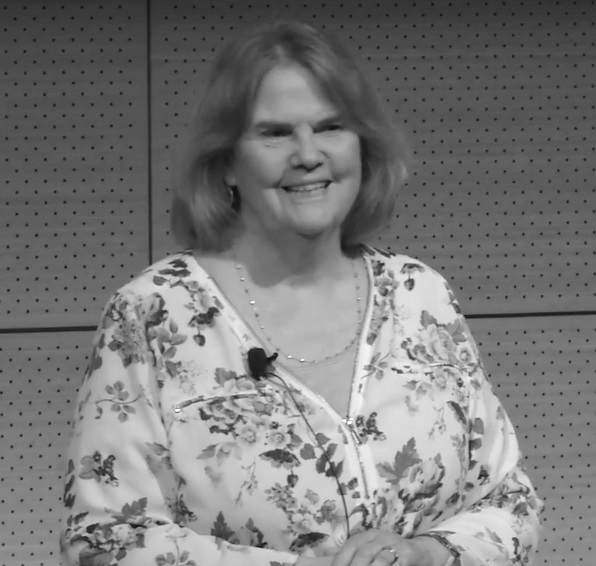
- Larsen-Freeman in 2018
- Born: 24 February 1946 (age 80); United States
- Education: University of Michigan (PhD)
- Known for: English as a second or foreign language; Language pedagogy; Complex Dynamic Systems Theory
- Spouse: Elliott Freeman
- Children: 2
- Scientific career
- Workplaces: University of California, Los Angeles; SIT Graduate Institute; University of Michigan; University of Pennsylvania
- Thesis: The Acquisition of Grammatical Morphemes by Adult Learners of English as a Second Language (1975)
- Doctoral advisor: H. Douglas Brown

Diane Larsen-Freeman (born 24 February 1946) is an American linguist. She is currently a Professor Emerita in Education and in Linguistics at the University of Michigan in Ann Arbor, Michigan. An applied linguist, known for her work in second language acquisition, English as a second or foreign language, language teaching methods, teacher education, and English grammar, she is renowned for her work on the complex/dynamic systems approach to second language development.

== Career ==
Larsen-Freeman began her career as a Peace Corps volunteer, teaching English in Sabah, Malaysia from 1967-1969, an experience she credits for igniting her fascination with language acquisition. She undertook graduate studies at the University of Michigan, earning her PhD in linguistics in 1975.

Larsen-Freeman first served on the faculty at the University of California, Los Angeles and then the SIT Graduate Institute. In 2002, she returned to the University of Michigan to direct the English Language Institute (ELI), now Michigan Language Assessment and was also appointed Professor in the School of Education and at the College of Literature, Science, and the Arts in the Department of Linguistics. She stepped down from directing the ELI in 2008 and retired from the University of Michigan in 2012, where she holds emerita positions as well as at the SIT Graduate Institute. She remains active in her field, and teaches courses on the structure of English and second language development as a visiting senior fellow at the University of Pennsylvania Graduate School of Education.

Larsen-Freeman concentrates her research on the process of second language acquisition. She also researches English grammar, which she regards not only as a set of structural patterns, but also as an important resource for making meaning and for adapting language to the communicative context. She has found that complexity theory provides new insights into language, its acquisition, and its use. She sees all three as complex, non-linear, dynamic processes. Such a perspective has contributed to her dynamic perspective of language, which she has applied to teaching grammar, or “grammaring” as she calls it. The dynamic approach to second language development also acknowledges the individual paths that students chart to second language success, and views teaching as fundamentally a process of managing learning.

Larsen-Freeman was also the editor of the journal Language Learning for five years.

== Research ==
In 1997, she wrote a seminal article in which she suggested the application of complex/dynamic systems theory to study second language acquisition. A book of papers in her honor, Complexity Theory and Language Development, was published in 2017.

Larsen-Freeman criticised Larry Selinker's Interlanguage in a chapter entitled Another Step to be Taken published in Han and Tarone's Interlanguage - Forty Years Later by claiming that there is no endpoint of the interlanguage continuum. She suggested the reconsideration of the Interlanguage.

== Bibliography ==
=== Books ===
- Larsen-Freeman, D. (Editor) (1980). Discourse Analysis in Second Language Research. Newbury House. ISBN 978-0883771631
- Celce-Murcia, M., & Larsen-Freeman, D. (1983). The Grammar Book: An ESL/EFL Teacher's Course. Newbury House. ISBN 978-0883772904
- Larsen-Freeman, D. (1986). Techniques and Principles in Language Teaching. Oxford University Press. ISBN 978-0194341332
- Larsen-Freeman, D., & Long, M.H. (1991). An Introduction to Second Language Acquisition Research. ISBN 978-0582553774
- Celce-Murcia, M., & Larsen-Freeman, D. (1999). The Grammar Book: An ESL/EFL Teacher’s Course (2nd edition). Heinle & Heinle. ISBN 978-0838447253
- Larsen-Freeman, D. (2000). Techniques and Principles in Language Teaching (2nd edition). Oxford University Press. ISBN 978-0194355742
- Larsen-Freeman, D. (Series Director) (2002). Olympic English. Mc-Graw Hill.
- Larsen-Freeman, D. (2003). Teaching Language: From Grammar to Grammaring. Heinle Cengage. ISBN 978-0838466759
- Larsen-Freeman, D., & Cameron, L. (2008). Complex Systems and Applied Linguistics. Oxford University Press. ISBN 978-0194422444
- Larsen-Freeman, D. (Series Director) (2008). Grammar Dimensions: Form, Meaning, and Use (Revised edition). National Geographic Learning.
- Ellis, N.C., & Larsen-Freeman, D. (Editors) (2009). Language as a Complex Adaptive System. Wiley-Blackwell. ISBN 978-1444334005
- Larsen-Freeman, D., & Anderson, M. (2011). Techniques and Principles in Language Teaching (3rd edition). Oxford University Press. ISBN 978-0194423601
- Larsen-Freeman, D., & Celce-Murcia, M. (2015). The Grammar Book: Form, Meaning and Use for English Language Teachers (3rd edition). National Geographic Learning/Cengage Publishing Company. ISBN 978-1111351861

=== Chapters ===
- Larsen-Freeman, D. (2011). Key concepts in language learning and language education. In J. Simpson (Ed.), Routledge Handbook of Applied Linguistics.
- Larsen-Freeman, D. (2011). A complexity theory approach to second language development/acquisition. In D. Atkinson (Ed.), Alternative Approaches to Second Language Acquisition (pp. 48–72). Routledge.
- Larsen-Freeman, D. (2012). Complexity theory. In S. Gass and A. Mackey (Eds.), Handbook of Second Language Acquisition (pp. 73−87). Routledge.
- Larsen-Freeman, D. (2012). Grateful for the many learnings from Caleb Gattegno. In The Gattegno Effect: 100 Voices on One of History's Greatest Educators. Educational Solutions, Inc
- Larsen-Freeman, D. (2013). Chaos/Complexity theory for second language acquisition/development. In C. Chapelle (Ed.), Encyclopedia of Applied Linguistics. Malden, MA: Wiley Blackwell.
- Larsen-Freeman, D. (2013). Complexity theory/Dynamic systems theory. In P. Robinson (Ed.), Encyclopedia of Second Language Acquisition. Routledge.
- Larsen-Freeman, D. (2013). Complex, dynamic systems and technemes. In J. Arnold Morgan and T. Murphey (Eds.), Meaningful Action: Earl Stevick’s Influence on Language Teaching. Cambridge University Press, 190−201.
- Larsen-Freeman, D. (2014). Teaching grammar. In M. Celce-Murcia, D. Brinton and M.A. Snow (Eds.), Teaching English as a Second or Foreign Language (4th ed.) National Geographic Learning/Cengage Learning, 256−270.
- Larsen-Freeman, D. (2014). Another step to be taken: Rethinking the endpoint of the interlanguage continuum. In Z.-H. Han & E. Tarone (Eds.), Interlanguage: Forty Years Later. Amsterdam: John Benjamins, 203−220.
- Larsen-Freeman, D. (2015). Ten Lessons from CDST: What is on offer. In Z. Dörnyei, P. MacIntyre, and A. Henry (Eds.), Motivational Dynamics in Language Learning, Multilingual Matters, 11−19.
- Larsen-Freeman, D. (2015). Complexity theory. In B. VanPatten and J. Williams (Eds.), Theories in Second Language Acquisition. 2nd edition. Routledge, 227−244.
- Larsen-Freeman, D. (2016). A successful union: Linking ELF with CAS. In L. Lopriore and E. Grazzi (Eds.), Intercultural Communication: New Perspectives from ELF (pp. 15–29). Rome: Roma Tres Press.
- Larsen-Freeman, D. (2016). World language teaching: Thinking differently. (with D. J.Tedick). In D. Gitomer and C. Bell (Eds.), Handbook of Research on Teaching. 5th edition. American Educational Research Association, 1335-1387.
- Larsen-Freeman, D. (2016). Complexity and ELF: A matter of nonteleology. In M.-L. Pitzl and R. Osimk-Teasdale, (Eds.), English as a Lingua Franca: Perspectives and prospects. Contributions in Honour of Barbara Seidlhofer (pp. 139−146). De Gruyter Mouton.
- Larsen-Freeman, D. (2017). Complexity theory: The lessons continue. In L. Ortega & Z.-H. Han (Eds.), Complexity Theory and Language Development: In Celebration of Diane Larsen-Freeman (pp. 11−50). Amsterdam and Philadelphia: John Benjamins.
- Larsen-Freeman, D. (2018). Complexity and ELF. In J. Jenkins, W. Baker and M. Dewey (Eds.), The Routledge Handbook on English as a Lingua Franca (pp. 51−60). Routledge.
- Larsen-Freeman, D., & H. Nguyen. (2018). Task-based language teaching and complexity theory. In M. Ahmadian & M. Del Pilar Garcia Mayo (Eds.), Recent *Larsen-Freeman, D. (2018). Perspectives on Task-based Learning and Teaching. (pp. 167−193). De Gruyter Mouton. doi 10.1515/9781501503399-009
- Larsen-Freeman, D. (2018). Second language acquisition, WE, and language as a complex adaptive system (CAS). In P. De Costa & K. Bolton (Eds.), World Englishes, 37(1) (Special Issue), 80−92. doi: 10.1111/weng.12304
- Larsen-Freeman, D. (2018). Task repetition or tasks iteration? It does make a difference. In M. Bygate (Ed.), Learning Language Through Task Repetition (pp. 311−329). Amsterdam and Philadelphia: John Benjamins.
- Larsen-Freeman, D. (2018). Resonances: Second language development and language planning and policy from a complexity theory perspective. In F. Hult, T. Kupisch, & M. Siiner (Eds.), Language Acquisition and Language Policy Planning (pp. 203−217). Springer.
- Larsen-Freeman, D., J. Blommaert, O. García, G. Kress. (2018). Communicating beyond diversity: a bricolage of ideas. In A. Sherris & E. Adami (Eds.), Making Signs, Translanguaging, Ethnographies (pp. 9–29). Bristol: Multilingual Matters.

=== Articles ===
- Larsen-Freeman, D.E. (1975). The acquisition of grammatical morphemes by adult ESL students. TESOL Quarterly, 9(4), 409-419.
- Larsen-Freeman, D. (1985). Overviews of theories of language learning and acquisition. In Issues in English Language Development, National Clearinghouse for Bilingual Education. ERIC: ED273145.
- Larsen-Freeman, D. (1989). Pedagogical descriptions of language: Grammar. Annual Review of Applied Linguistics, 10, 187-195.
- Larsen-Freeman, D. (1991). Second language acquisition research: Staking out the territory. TESOL Quarterly, 25(2), 315-350.
- Larsen-Freeman, D. (1997). Chaos/complexity science and second language acquisition. Applied Linguistics, 18(2), 141-165.
- Larsen-Freeman, D. (2002). Making sense of frequency. Studies in Second Language Acquisition, 24(2), 275-285.
- Larsen-Freeman, D. (2004). Conversation analysis for second language acquisition? It all depends. The Modern Language Journal, 88(4), 603-607.
- Larsen-Freeman, D. (2006). The emergence of complexity, fluency, and accuracy in the oral and written production of five Chinese learners of English. Applied Linguistics, 27(4), 590-619.
- Ellis, N.C., & Larsen-Freeman, D. (2006). Language emergence: Implications for applied linguistics. Applied Linguistics, 27, 558-589.
- Larsen-Freeman, D. (2007). On the complementarity of chaos/complexity theory and dynamic systems theory in understanding the second language acquisition process. Bilingualism: Language and Cognition, 10(1), 35-37.
- Larsen-Freeman, D., & Freeman, D. (2008). Language moves: The place of "foreign" languages in classroom teaching and learning. Review of Research in Education, 32(1), 147-186.
- Larsen-Freeman, D., & Cameron, L. (2008). Research methodology on language development from a complex systems perspective. The Modern Language Journal, 92(2), 200-213.
- Larsen-Freeman, D. (2009). Teaching and testing grammar. In M. Long & C. Doughty (Eds.), The Handbook of Language Teaching. Blackwell.
- Ellis, N.C., & Larsen-Freeman, D. (2009). Constructing a second language: Analyses and computational simulations of the emergence of linguistic constructions from usage. Language Learning, 59(s1), 90-125.
- Larsen-Freeman, D. (2011). Key concepts in language learning and language education. In J. Simpson (Ed.), Routledge Handbook of Applied Linguistics.
- Larsen-Freeman, D. (2012). Complex, dynamic systems: A new transdisciplinary theme for applied linguistics? Language Teaching, 45(2), 202-214.
- Larsen-Freeman, D. (2012). From unity to diversity... to diversity within unity. English Teaching Forum, 50(2), 28-38.
- Larsen-Freeman, D. (2012). On the role of repetition in language teaching and learning. Applied Linguistics Review, 3(2), 195-210.
- Larsen-Freeman, D. (2012). The emancipation of the language learner. Studies in Second Language Learning and Teaching, 2(3), 297-309.
- Larsen-Freeman, D. (2013). Transfer of learning transformed. Language Learning, 63(s1), 107-129.
- Larsen-Freeman, D. (2015). Saying what we mean: Making the case for second language acquisition to become second language development. Language Teaching, 48(4), 491-505.
- Larsen-Freeman, D. (2015). Research into practice: Grammar learning and teaching. Language Teaching, 48(2), 263-280.
- The Douglas Fir Group. (2016). A transdisciplinary framework for SLA in a multilingual world. The Modern Language Journal, 16, 19-47.
- Larsen-Freeman, D. (2016). Classroom-oriented research from a complex systems perspective. Studies in Second Language Learning and Teaching, 6(3), 377-393.

== Awards ==
- Kenneth W. Mildenberger Prize with Lynne Cameron for Complex Systems and Applied Linguistics, awarded by the Modern Language Association (2008)
- Distinguished Scholarship and Service Award, awarded by the American Association of Applied Linguistics (2011)
- 50 at 50 Leader in TESOL, selected by TESOL International Association (2016)
