= Rod Ellis =

New Zealand linguist

- Known for: Second language acquisition
- Awards: 1985: Best book prize (British Association of Applied Linguists); 1988: Modern Language Association of America prize; 1995: Duke of Edinburgh best book prize; 2013: Appointed Distinguished Profess in the University of Auckland; 2014: Appointed fellow of Royal Society of New Zealand

Academic background
- Education: University of Leeds; University of Bristol; University of London

Academic work
- Discipline: Applied Linguist
- Sub-discipline: Second language acquisition
- Institutions: Temple University, Japan Campus; Temple University, Philadelphia Campus; University of Auckland; Curtin University; Anaheim University
- Website: Ellis on the website of Curtin University

Rod Ellis is a Kenneth W. Mildenberger Prize-winning British linguist. He is currently a research professor in the School of Education, at Curtin University in Perth, Australia. He is also a professor at Anaheim University, where he serves as the Vice president of academic affairs. Ellis is a visiting professor at Shanghai International Studies University as part of China’s Chang Jiang Scholars Program and an emeritus professor of the University of Auckland. He has also been elected as an honorary fellow of the Royal Society of New Zealand.

== Education ==
Ellis began his post-secondary education at Nottingham University where he obtained an undergraduate degree. He received a Master of Arts from the University of Leeds, a Master of Education from the University of Bristol, and a doctorate from the University of London.

== Career ==
After obtaining his undergraduate degree, Ellis moved to Spain where he taught at a Berlitz language school before returning to London to teach at an elementary school. In 1967, Ellis moved to Zambia where he taught for 3 years. Following his first masters degree, Ellis returned to Zambia as a teacher trainer. Ellis then went on to teach linguistics and TESOL at St. Mary's College in London.

Ellis taught as a professor at Temple University in Japan until 1993 when he relocated to Temple University in Philadelphia. He taught here for 5 years before filling a professorship position at the University of Auckland in New Zealand where he established the University of Auckland's English Language Academy.

He has held university positions in six countries and has also conducted numerous consultancies and seminars throughout the world.

== Research ==
During his 30 years of research, Ellis has authored and co-authored more than 40 distinct publications. His published work includes articles and books on second language acquisition, language teaching and teacher education. His latest book is Becoming and Being an Applied Linguist (John Benjamins). Other recent publications include Language Teaching Research and Language Pedagogy in 2012 (Wiley-Blackwell), Exploring Language Pedagogy and Second Language Acquisition Research in 2014 (with Natsuko Shintani) (Routledge) and Understanding Second Language Acquisition 2nd Edition in 2015 (Oxford University Press).

He has also published several English language textbooks, including Impact Grammar (Pearson: Longman).

He is a leading theorist of task-based language learning, and has published two books and more than a dozen articles on the subject.

His research interests include: Second language acquisition, individual learner differences, form-focused instruction, teacher education, course design and methodology of language teaching.

== Task-Based Language Teaching ==
A leading theorist in his field of study, Ellis has focused much of his research on task-based language teaching (TBLT). In defining a task, Ellis draws off the definitions provided by others scholars (namely David Nunan and Graham Crookes) by focusing on the successful conveyance of language.

Ellis defines the key features of a task as being:

1. A workplan: there is a set of teaching materials and activities which are designated for the learning process.
2. A primary focus on meaning: there is a gap of communication or reason that must be filled through interaction. Students are given the freedom to use the language of their choosing rather than focusing on grammatical form.
3. A real world process of language: the task can take the form of an interaction that is likely or less than likely to happen in the real world. The language process should exhibit real-world communication.
4. One that involves any of the four languages skills (reading, writing, listening or speaking).
5. One that engages cognitive processes: students must utilize cognitive processes through their engagement with the task, such as ordering, analyzing and selecting.
6. A clearly defined communicative outcome: the goal of the activity includes a non-linguistic negotiation for meaning.

In his explanation of a task, Ellis careful to illustrate its contrast with an activity, with the former being primarily meaning focused and the latter placing more emphasis on form. This distinction also affects the role of each participant, as a task requires students to act as language users. Alternatively, an activity requires the students to act as language learners.

== 10 Principles of Instructed Language Learning ==
Through his research, Ellis has worked to provide comprehensive guidance for language teachers. Ellis maintains that despite the theoretical contributions made by Stephen Krashen, Robert DeKeyser, Michael Long and Bill VanPatten to the field of second language acquisition, there is no agreement on form-focused instruction or corrective feedback. In 2004, he compiled a set of 10 principles of instructed language learning that have been considered and challenged by other SLA scholars.

These principles include:

1. instruction must enlarge the student's use of formulaic expressions while maintaining a focus on rule-based competence.
2. instruction must ensure meaning-focused input and output.
3. instruction must ensure that students also focus on form.
4. instruction must aim to create a balance between implicit and explicit knowledge of the language.
5. Instruction must account for the student's built-in syllabus (noting the Natural approach to learning developed by Stephen Krashen).
6. Instruction must include extensive L2 input.
7. Instruction must include opportunities for output.
8. Interaction with the language is the basis of proficiency-building.
9. Instruction must consider the individual differences of learners.
10. Assessment should include both free and controlled production.

The basis for this list is grounded in various theoretical perspectives, though namely the computational model of L2 learning developed by James Lantolf. This model has its limitations according to Ellis, as it does not account for social relations and contexts. However, it provides an appropriate basis for establishing a set of principles for language instruction.

== Form-Focused Instruction versus Meaning-Focused Instruction ==
Ellis maintains that the distinction between form-focused instruction and meaning-focused instruction lies in how language is perceived and the role of the student. The former is concerned with drawing the student's attention to linguistic form (including, but not restricted to, vocabulary and grammar) whereas the latter focuses on conveying messages.

In taking note of the reconceptualization of focus-on-form by other scholars, notably Michael Long, Catherine Doughty and Jessica Williams, Ellis distinguishes between planned and incidental focus on form. According to Ellis, there are three types of form-focused instruction:

1. Focus on forms: can be implicit or explicit, can include structured input or production practice and it can include functional language practice.
2. Planned focus on form: can include enriched input or a focused communicative task.
3. Incidental focus on form: can be pre-emptive or reactive; can include implicit negative feedback or explicit negative feedback.

The effectiveness of form-focused instruction depends on multiple variables, such as the linguistic items being taught, the learners' developmental stage, the instructional context and instructional materials. Ellis also maintains that form focused instruction not only facilitates language learning, but also that it does not change the sequence of language development.

== Corrective Feedback ==
In a 2006 study, Ellis found that groups of students who had been given explicit instructions and grammar rules prior to taking multiple tests at different times initially had different outcomes based on what was being assessed, but by the final test, there was little to no difference between the groups of students. In the same study, Ellis argues that students may already possess certain knowledge of a language's grammar, but when shown how to use this internal knowledge correctly, the acquisition of the language can dramatically increase.

Ellis argues in favour of explicit feedback rather than implicit feedback, such as recasts. Accordingly, with the latter, there is positive evidence, though it is not clear whether it provides negative evidence. Ellis supports consciousness-raising as a method for self-correction. Ellis suggests that explicit corrective feedback can be useful in the syntactic and other grammatical understandings in the target language by asserting and demonstrating the type of mistake produced in an utterance. Ellis states that by giving students explicit corrective feedback on mistakes, there is the possibility of students internalizing this new grammatical knowledge being learned for future usage. One reason, as mentioned previously, is that after given the explicit feedback, it allows students to witness the grammatical mistakes being made and self-correct the mistake, allowing for the learner to acquire grammatical knowledge of the language.

== Criticism ==
As a leading theorist in task-based learning (TBL), Ellis has defended TBL from an assertion by Henry Widdowson that the definition of a task is too loose and tends to blur with the concept of an activity. Ellis refutes this claim by explaining that he clearly distinguishes a task from an activity in his works. One of the main ways in which Ellis distinguishes a task from an activity is by arguing the usefulness of each in regard to communication fluency for a task and correct form usage for an activity. Ellis has also contested Paul Seedhouse who argued that such a method could result in pidginized language, to which Ellis claims that it depends on the nature of the task. This method of teaching (TBLT) has been considered by William Littlewood as too difficult for beginner students. The view that Littlewood has against Ellis's TBLT method is that the required knowledge of the target language must already be at a fairly proficient level in order to complete the tasks being carried out. Ellis explains that this is true on the basis that it is a production task; other gap-fill activities can be used by beginners.

Ellis further explains that TBLT can be as effective as other methods of teaching a second language whereby the learner may reflect upon their first language as a guide when completing tasks to strengthen comprehension levels in their second language. Michael Swan, protests Ellis in this regard by claiming that TBL is not any more effective than other language teaching methods, since TBL is lacking the structure needed to explicitly teach grammar to learners. Swan claims, that due to this lack of a systemic or clear breakdown for structure, that Ellis' TBL is more theoretical in nature due to lack of evidence in effect toward language acquisition in students. Another scholar, David Block, praises Ellis' task-based method as being inventive, however, similarly to Swan, Block defines Ellis' approach to language teaching heavily theoretical, with Ellis not mentioning how long a TBLT course should be or the maximum number of students it can support in a single class.

== Awards ==
- 1985: Best book prize (British Association for Applied Linguistics), for Understanding Second Language Acquisition
- 1988: Kenneth W. Mildenberger Prize
- 1995: Duke of Edinburgh best book prize, for The Study of Second language Acquisition
- 2013: Appointed distinguished professor in the University of Auckland
- 2014: Appointed honorary Fellow of the Royal Society of New Zealand
- 2016: Kenneth W. Mildenberger Prize honorable mention

== Selected publications ==
=== Books ===
- 1984 Classroom Second Language Development. Oxford: Pergamon (subsequently reprinted in 1987 by Prentice Hall).
- 1985 Understanding Second Language Acquisition. Oxford: Oxford University Press (awarded prize by British Association of Applied Linguists).
- 1987 Second Language Acquisition in Context (ed.), Prentice Hall (awarded prize by Modern Language Association of America).
- 1989 Classroom Language Learning (ed), Special issue of System (Vol. 17,2).
- 1990 Instructed Second Language Acquisition, Oxford: Blackwell.
- 1992 Second Language Acquisition and Language Pedagogy, Clevedon, Avon: Multilingual Matters.
- 1994 The Study of Second Language Acquisition, Oxford: Oxford University Press (awarded the Duke of Edinburgh prize for the best book in applied linguistics)
- 1998 Research and Language Teaching. Oxford: Oxford University Press
- 1999 First Steps in Reading: A Teacher’s handbook for Using Starter Readers in the Primary School. Oxford: Heinemann.
- 1999 Learning a Second Language Through Interaction. Amsterdam: John Benjamin's.
- 2000 "Form-Focused Instruction and Second Language Learning" (ed.). Special issue of Language Learning. Oxford: Blackwell.
- 2003 Task-based Language Learning and Teaching. Oxford: Oxford University Press
- 2004/5 Analyzing Learner Language. Oxford: Oxford University Press (with Gary Barkhuizen)
- 2004/5 Planning in Task-based Performance. Amsterdam: John Benjamin's (editor).
- 2008 The Study of Second Language Acquisition (2nd edition), Oxford: Oxford University Press
- 2009 Implicit and Explicit Knowledge in Second Language Learning, Testing and Teaching, Bristol, UK, Multilingual Matters (with S Loewen, C Elder, R Erlam, J Philp and H Reinders)
- Ellis, R., & Shintani, N. (2014). Exploring Language Pedagogy Through Second Language Acquisition Research. Routledge.
- Ellis, R. (2015). Understanding Second Language Acquisition: Second Edition. Oxford University Press, USA.
- Ellis, R. (2016). Becoming and Being an Applied Linguist: The life histories of some applied linguists. John Benjamins Publishing Company.
- Ellis, R. (2018). Reflections on Task-Based Language Teaching. Channel View Publications.

=== Articles ===
- 2005 Principles of Instructed Language Learning. Volume 7 Asian EFL Journal.
- 2007 Educational Settings and Second Language Learning. Volume 9 Asian EFL Journal.

==== External links ====
- Keynote YouTube talk on task-based pedagogy
