= Irish Association for Applied Linguistics =

- Cumann na Teangeolaíochta Feidhmí in Éirinn
- Abbreviation: IRAAL
- Formation: 1975; 51 years ago
- Fields: Linguistics, Applied Linguistics, Sociolinguistics
- Main organ: TEANGA [GA]
- Website: iraal.ie

The Irish Association for Applied Linguistics (Irish: Cumann na Teangeolaíochta Feidhmí), or IRAAL, is an academic society that connects language lecturers, language teachers, and researchers in linguistics, applied linguistics, and sociolinguistics with an active community keeping up with the latest language developments across Ireland. IRAAL is affiliated with the International Association of Applied Linguistics (AILA) and pursues its aim of supporting research by organising seminars, lectures, conferences and workshops. IRAAL publishes Teanga, an annual journal, as well as other special volumes.

== History ==
IRAAL was founded in 1975 to support research in applied and general linguistics in Ireland. The initial discussion of its establishment was instigated by Professor Conn Ó Cléirigh, the first Chairman of Institiúd Teangeolaíochta Éireann (ITÉ) [GA].

== TEANGA ==
Since 1979 IRAAL has published TEANGA [GA], the Association's bilingual, peer-reviewed academic journal. Since 2016 it has been published as an open-access journal, available online.

== See also ==
- Applied linguistics
- Language acquisition
- Linguistics
