= Varatha Shanmuganathan =

Sri Lankan-Canadian academic, lecturer and educator

Varatha Shanmuganathan is a Sri Lankan-Canadian academic, lecturer and educator. She was acknowledged for her academic performance in her old age when she obtained her master's degree at 87 years old. Her academic achievements also defied the stereotypes about the age factor.

== Biography ==
Varatha was born in Velanai, a small village in Sri Lanka. Her experiences during Sri Lankan Civil War kindled a passion and keen interest in peace and political science from a young age. She later immigrated to Canada in 2004 in order to be under her daughter's care. She is a grandmother of seven grandchildren.

She obtained a bachelor's degree at the University of Madras. After gaining her bachelor's degree at the University of Madras, she returned to her motherland Sri Lanka and began teaching about Indian history and English language to students. She also obtained a diploma in education from the University of Ceylon. In 1990, she travelled to London in order to teach English as a secondary language, where she also developed her teaching prowess. She obtained her first master's degree during her 50's in the field of applied linguistics from the University of London.

She pursued her master's degree in the field of political science at the York University in Canada. Her dream of studying political science came to fruition when she first heard about the free tuition provided by York University for senior citizens aged 60 or above, and she immediately enrolled herself to study political science in 2019 at the age of 85. She continued her studies in political science despite setbacks from COVID-19 pandemic . She subsequently graduated with her master's degree in November 2021 and became the oldest ever person to obtain a master's degree in the history of York University. Her research field during her master's program revolved around the impact of the civil war in Sri Lanka and peace talk efforts which were negotiated by international peacekeepers during the war.
