= Teresa P. Pica =

American professor of education

- Born: September 26, 1945
- Died: November 15, 2011 (aged 66); Philadelphia, Pennsylvania, U.S.
- Other name: Tere Pica
- Occupation: Professor of education at the University of Pennsylvania Graduate School of Education
- Years active: 1983-2011
- Known for: Task-based language learning

Academic background
- Education: College of New Rochelle; Columbia University; University of Pennsylvania Graduate School of Education

Teresa P. Pica (26 September 1945 – 15 November 2011), also known as Tere Pica, was a professor of education at the University of Pennsylvania Graduate School of Education, a post she held from 1983 until her death in 2011. Her areas of expertise included second language acquisition, language curriculum design, approaches to classroom practice, and classroom discourse analysis. Pica was well known for her pioneering work in task-based language learning and published widely in established international journals in the field of English as a foreign or second language and applied linguistics.

== Early years ==
Before entering the field of Teachers of English to Speakers of Other Languages (TESOL), Pica was a speech and language pathologist, working at the Child Development Center in Mount Vernon, New York, where she established a pre-school language stimulation program.

== Education ==
Pica graduated from Trumbull High School in 1963, and then attended the College of New Rochelle, where she graduated in 1967 with a bachelor's degree in English and speech communications. She received her master's degree in speech pathology from Columbia University in 1969. She earned her Ph.D. in educational linguistics from the University of Pennsylvania Graduate School of Education in three years, graduating in 1982.

== Teaching ==
In 1983, she took over the position of her advisor, Michael Long, who left Penn in 1982.

Pica supervised more than 50 doctoral dissertations at Penn and at universities abroad. Some of her best-known advisees include her first two doctoral students, Jessica Williams (1987) and Catherine Doughty (1988), as well as Richard Young, Valerie Jakar, Joanna Labov, and Shannon Sauro. Pica's last doctoral student to complete was Elizabeth Scheyder.

== Personal life ==
Dr. Pica was married to Robert Hamilton. She died in 2011 at her home in Philadelphia of viral encephalitis.

== Select publications ==
- — (December 1983). "Adult Acquisition of English as a Second Language Under Different Conditions of Exposure". Language Learning. 33 (4): 465–497. doi:10.1111/j.1467-1770.1983.tb00945.x.
- — (June 1985). "The Role of Group Work in Classroom Second Language Acquisition". Studies in Second Language Acquisition. 7 (2): 233–248. doi:10.1017/S0272263100005398. ISSN 1470-1545.
- — (September 1994). "Research on Negotiation: What Does It Reveal About Second-Language Learning Conditions, Processes, and Outcomes?". Language Learning. 44 (3): 493–527. doi:10.1111/j.1467-1770.1994.tb01115.x.
- — (1996). "Language Learners' Interaction: How Does It Address the Input, Output, and Feedback Needs of L2 Learners?". TESOL Quarterly. 30 (1): 59–84. doi:10.2307/3587607. ISSN 0039-8322. JSTOR 3587607.
- — (2005). "Classroom Learning, Teaching, and Research: A Task-Based Perspective". The Modern Language Journal. 89 (3): 339–352. doi:10.1111/j.1540-4781.2005.00309.x. ISSN 0026-7902. JSTOR 3588662.
