= Input Processing theory =

Theory of language acquisition

The Input Processing theory, put forth by Bill VanPatten in 1993, describes the process of strategies and mechanisms that learners use to link linguistic form with its meaning or function. Input Processing is a theory in second language acquisition that focuses on how learners process linguistic data in spoken or written language.

The theory comprises two key principles, each with multiple sub-principles.

The first principle, the Primacy Principle of Meaning, has the following sub-principles: Primacy of Content Words, the Lexical Preference principle, the Preference for Non-redundancy principle, the Meaning-Before-Non-Meaning principle, the Availability of Resources principle, and the Sentence Location principle.

The second principle, the First Noun Principle, has the following sub-principles: The Lexical Semantics principle, the Event Probabilities principle, and the Contextual Constraint principle.

The Input Processing Theory has faced criticism. Opponents refuse the ‘acquisition-by-comprehension’ claim, as various processes may determine comprehension and production of language, and there is disagreement regarding how to distinguish input and intake. Some researchers claim that VanPatten's model ignores output.

== Overview ==
Input Processing (IP) was first proposed by VanPatten in 1993, and there have been several updates to the theory. IP addresses how learners initially perceive and process linguistic data in spoken or written language. The theory addresses the psycholinguistic strategies and mechanisms that learners use to derive intake from input and also asks which psycholinguistic strategies the second language (L2) learner tends to rely upon during input processing. For example, it examines how learners extract form from input and the way they assign grammatical roles to nouns while the primary attention is on meaning.

In 2003, VanPatten proposed that IP consists of two sub-processes: (1) making form-meaning connections; and (2) parsing. Making form-meaning pertains to obtaining the connection between, for example, -s suffix and third person singular from the input. In an earlier version of the theory, making form-meaning was composed of four principles: 1) The primacy of meaning principle; 2) the availability of resources principle; 3) the first noun principle; and 4) the sentence location principle.

By contrast, parsing refers to the mapping of syntactic structures onto the utterance. For example, parsing examines how a subject knows which noun is the subject and which is the object when hearing a sentence. Since the 2003 literature, VanPatten's theory has been updated and modified.

== Processing Instruction ==
Processing instruction is a particular type of pedagogical intervention that focuses on form derived from insights on input processing. Unlike other techniques, it is not concerned with the teaching of rules but the processing of morpho‐lexical units in the input. Processing instruction consists of referential and affective activities that manipulate input in particular ways to push learners away from less than optimal processing strategies. To date, there have been dozens of studies examining a variety of factors and issues, all pointing to robust findings of the positive effects of processing instruction.

== Key principles ==
VanPatten's modified theory is explained in the form of two principles, each with multiple sub-principles.

The first principle is the Primacy Principle of Meaning.| This principle maintains that a learner processes input for meaning before they process input for form. This principle has six sub-principles which are summarized as follows:

- 1a - The Primacy of Content Words principle explains that learners process content words in the input before they process other linguistic features.
- 1b - The Lexical Preference principle describes that learners will depend on lexical items to extract meaning as opposed to grammatical form.
- 1c - The Preference for Non-Redundancy principle maintains that learners tend to process non-redundant meaningful grammatical forms before they process redundant meaningful forms.
- 1d - The Meaning-Before-Non-Meaning principle describes that learners are more likely to process meaningful grammatical forms before non-meaningful forms regardless of redundancy.
- 1e - The Availability of Resources principle explains that for learners to process either redundant meaningful grammatical forms or non-meaningful forms, the processing of the meaning of the sentence must not drain available processing resources.
- Principle 1f - The Sentence Location principle is the idea that learners tend to process items in sentence-initial position before those in medial or final position.

The second principle is the First Noun Principle. This principle describes that learners tend to process the first noun or pronoun they encounter in a sentence as the subject or agent. This principle has three sub-principles which are summarized as follows:

- 2a - The Lexical Semantics principle explains that, in order to interpret sentences, learners may depend on lexical semantics instead of word order.
- 2b - The Event Probabilities principle describes that learners may depend on event probabilities to interpret sentences instead of word order.
- 2c - The Contextual Constraint principle is the idea that learners may depend less on the First Noun Principle if the previous context constrains the possible interpretation of a clause or sentence.

== Opposition ==
In earlier versions of the Input Processing theory, several researchers disagreed with VanPatten's claims. These opponents do not accept the ‘acquisition-by-comprehension’ claim as various processes may determine comprehension and production. Salaberry states that within the Input Processing theory there are misunderstandings of how to distinguish input and intake, meaning it is difficult to understand the difference between the knowledge the environment provides and the amount of knowledge it provides. Some researchers claim that VanPatten's model ignores output.

VanPatten's model does not exclude the role of output, but communicates a different status by comparing the process of language development.
