= International Association of Applied Linguistics =

French association for applied linguistics

The International Association of Applied Linguistics (French: Association Internationale de Linguistique Appliquée), or AILA, was formed in 1964 as an association of various national organizations for applied linguistics. AILA has more than 8,000 members in more than 35 different applied linguistics associations around the world. AILA continues to grow, working with existing and emerging regional networks, such as AILA East Asia, AILA Europe, AILA Arabia, and AILA Latin America. Its most high-profile activity is the World Congress of Applied Linguistics, which takes place once every three years. It also has two publications, AILA News, a newsletter, and the AILA Review, an academic journal.

== History ==
AILA was founded in 1964 at an international colloquium at the University of Nancy, France. Its founding had been preceded by two years of preparation, of which two central figures were the French linguists Antoine Culioli and Guy Capelle. As part of this preparation, the association had published the first issue of its official journal, the International Review of Applied Linguistics, in 1963.

By 1969, the association had gained affiliate organizations in the form of national associations, centers for applied linguistics, and applied linguistics working groups, in a total of 18 different countries. In this year, the association held its second meeting, this time sponsored by the British Association for Applied Linguistics.

== Committee ==
There are eight committees of the association. Each member of the committee is appointed by the current president.

=== Solidarity Award Committee ===
- Azirah Hashim (chair)
- Marjolijn Verspoor (member)
- Andrea Sterzuk (member)

=== The Honorary Award Committee ===
- Susan Hunston (chair)
- Sarah O'Brien (member)
- Meilutė Ramonienė (member)

=== Editorial Board of AILA Review ===
- Antje Wilton (chair)
- Limin Jin (member)
- Rosa Manchón (member)
- Branca Falabella Fabricio (member)
- Barbara Seidlhofer (member)

=== Editorial Board of AILA Applied Linguistics Series (AALS) ===
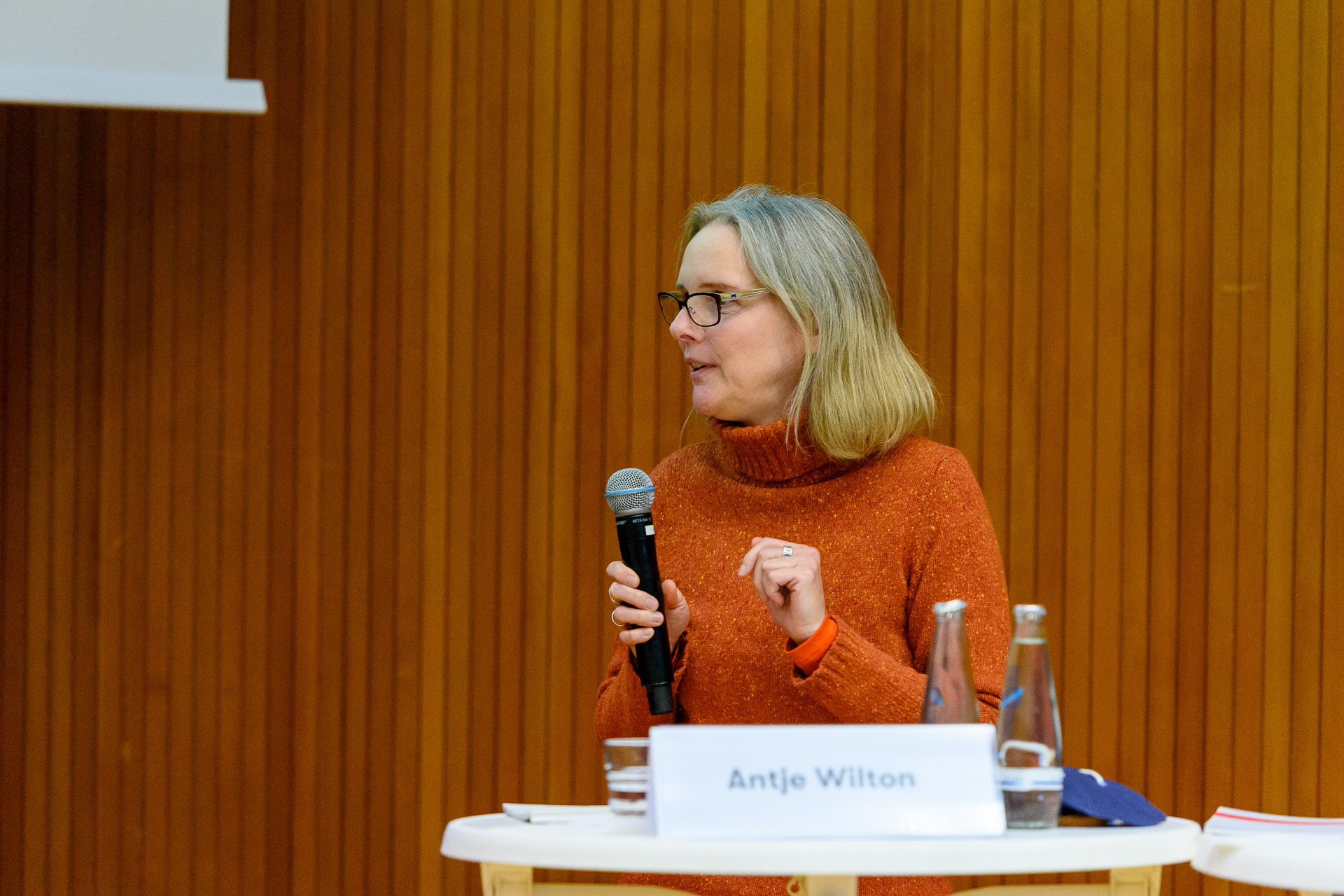
Prof. Antje Wilton in 2022

- Antje Wilton (chair)
- Hisako Yamauchi (member)
- Anne Pitkanen-Huhta (member)
- Hanele Dufva (member)
- Folkert Kuiken (member)
- Susanne Niemeier (member)
- Rosa Manchón (member)
- Susan Gass (member)

=== ReN Committee ===
- Laura Gurzynski-Weiss (chair)
- Anne Pitkanen-Huhta (member)
- Lian Zhang (member)
- Laurie Anderson (member)

=== Nominating Committee ===
- Claire Kramsch (chair)
- Ee Ling Low (member)
- Markus Bieswanger (member)

=== The IACC Committee ===
- Daniel Perrin (chair)
- Paula Szundy (member)
- Marjolijn Verspoor (member)

== Objectives ==
AILA has three main objectives: to facilitate international cooperation in the field of applied linguistics, to promote research and teaching, and to disseminate new applied linguistics theories.

== Presidential history ==
AILA Presidents are appointed every three years to coincide with the world congress. The position has been held for up to two consecutive three-year periods.

List of AILA Presidents
Period	President	Affiliation
1964–1969	Bernard Pottier	Paris-Sorbonne University
1969–1972	Pit Corder	University of Edinburgh
1972–1975	Pit Corder	University of Edinburgh
1975–1978	Guy Rondeau	University of Montreal
1978–1981	Guy Rondeau	University of Montreal
1981–1984	Jan Svartvik	Lund University
1984–1987	Jos Nivette	
1987–1990	Albert Valdman	Indiana University
1990–1993	Albert Valdman	Indiana University
1993–1996	Marc Spoelders	Ghent University
1996–1999	Christopher Candlin	Macquarie University
1999–2002	Christopher Candlin	Macquarie University
2002–2005	Susan Gass	Michigan State University
2005–2008	Susan Gass	Michigan State University
2008–2011	Martin Bygate	Lancaster University
2011–2014	Bernd Rüschoff	University of Duisburg-Essen
2014–2017	Claire Kramsch	University of California, Berkeley
2017–2021	Daniel Perrin	Zurich University of Applied Sciences/ZHAW
2021–2024	Azirah Hashim	University of Malaya

== Editorial board ==
- Limin Jin
- Barbara Seidlhofer
- Rosa Manchón
- Branca Falabella Fabricio

== Affiliates ==
AILA has affiliate associations in the following 34 countries:

- Australia: Applied Linguistics Association of Australia (ALAA)
- Austria: Verband für angewandte Linguistic (VERBAL)
- Belgium: Association Belge de Linguistique Appliquée (ABLA)
- Brazil: Applied Linguistics Association of Brazil (ALAB)
- Cameroon: AILA Cameroon (CAMAILA)
- Canada: Canadian Association of Applied Linguistics (CAAL)
- China: China English Language Education Association (CELEA)
- Estonia: Estonian Association of Applied Linguistics (EAAL)
- Finland: Finnish Association of Applied Linguistics (AFinLA)
- France: Association Française de Linguistique Appliquée (AFLA)
- Germany: Gesellschaft für Angewandte Linguistik (GAL)
- Greece: Greek Applied Linguistics Association (GALA)
- Ireland: Irish Association for Applied Linguistics (IRAAL)
- Israel: Israel Association of Applied Linguistics (ILASH) Archived 2021-03-14 at the Wayback Machine
- Italy: Associazione Italiana di Linguistica Applicata (AItLA)
- Japan: Japan Association of Applied Linguistics (JAAL)
- Korea (South): Applied Linguistics Association of Korea (ALAK) Archived 2014-12-23 at the Wayback Machine
- Malaysia: Malaysian Association of Applied Linguistics (MAAL)
- Mexico: Asociación Mexicana de Lingüística Aplicada (AMLA)
- Netherlands: Association Nederlandaise de Linguistique Applique (ANELA)
- New Zealand: Applied Linguistics Association of New Zealand (ALANZ)
- Norway: Association Norvegienne de Linguistique Appliquèe (ANLA)
- Philippines: Linguistic Society of the Philippines (LSP)
- Russian Federation: National Association for Applied Linguistics (NAAL)
- Serbia and Montenegro: Association for Applied Linguistics in Bosnia and Herzegovina (AALBiH) Archived 2018-11-07 at the Wayback Machine
- Singapore: Singapore Association for Applied Linguistics (SAAL) Archived 2015-02-18 at the Wayback Machine
- Slovenia: Slovene Association for Applied Linguistics (SALA)
- South Africa: Southern African Applied Linguistics Association (SAALA)
- Spain: Asociaciõn Española de Linguistica Aplicada (AEsLA)
- Sweden: Association Suèdoise de Linguistique Appliquèe (ASLA)
- Switzerland: Association Suisse de Linguistique Appliquèe (VALS/ASLA)
- United Kingdom: British Association of Applied Linguistics (BAAL)
- United States: American Association for Applied Linguistics (AAAL)

== Activities ==
World Congress of Applied Linguistics AILA’s most high-profile activity is the World Congress of Applied Linguistics, an international conference hosted by one of the affiliate national associations every three years. The one exception to the three-year pattern was the first World Congress in Nancy, France, as there was a five-year gap between that and the second World Congress in Cambridge, England.

The list of world congresses is as follows:

No.	Year	City	Country
1.	1964	Nancy	France
2.	1969	Cambridge	United Kingdom
3.	1972	Copenhagen	Denmark
4.	1975	Stuttgart	Germany
5.	1978	Montreal	Canada
6.	1981	Lund	Sweden
7.	1984	Brussels	Belgium
8.	1987	Sydney	Australia
9.	1990	Chalkidiki	Greece
10.	1993	Amsterdam	Netherlands
11.	1996	Jyväskylä	Finland
12.	1999	Tokyo	Japan
13.	2002	Singapore	Singapore
14.	2005	Madison, Wisconsin	United States
15.	2008	Essen	Germany
16.	2011	Beijing	China
17.	2014	Brisbane	Australia
18.	2017	Rio de Janeiro	Brazil
19.	2020	Groningen	Netherlands
20.	2024	Kuala Lumpur	Malaysia
21.	2027	Vancouver	Canada

== Publications ==
AILA has two main publications, AILA News and the AILA Review. AILA News is a newsletter, published three times a year, and the AILA Review is a journal, published once a year and edited by guest editors. Each edition of the AILA Review either contains collections of papers on a particular topic, or a collection of papers from one of the World Congresses. In addition to these two publications, AILA also works with the British Association for Applied Linguistics, the American Association for Applied Linguistics, and Oxford University Press to publish the journal Applied Linguistics.

== Governance ==
Decisions in the association are made by the executive board and the international committee. The executive board makes recommendations to the international committee, on which all the national affiliated associations of applied linguistics can vote. These votes take place once a year, at different sites around the world.

The executive board has eleven posts, seven of which are fixed roles. These are the president, a past president, the treasurer, the secretary general, the research networks coordinator and the publications coordinator. The remaining four posts do not have a fixed role, and their holders are known as members at large. Members of the board cover their own expenses.
