= Channel View Publications =

British academic publisher

- Founder: Mike and Marjukka Grover
- Country of origin: UK
- Headquarters location: Bristol
- Key people: Tommi Grover
- Publication types: Books
- Imprints: Multilingual Matters
- No. of employees: 6
- Official website: www.channelviewpublications.com

Channel View Publications is an independent academic publisher in applied linguistics based in Bristol, UK.

The company was founded in the 1980s by Mike and Marjukka Grover and is currently managed by their son Tommi Grover. The company’s publication programme has diversified quite widely from the early days of the company when the directors Mike and Marjukka Grover wanted to bring up their sons bilingually (he is English, she is Finnish) and, being unable to find any books on the subject, decided to publish some themselves. Nowadays the firm and its imprint Multilingual Matters publishes textbooks and research monographs in the fields of tourism studies, applied linguistics, literacy education, multicultural education and immigrant language learning.

The company now has over 900 titles to its name, and publishes around 50 books every year.
