= Nick Ellis =

Welsh psychologist

- Born: 12 May 1953 (age 73); Liverpool, England, United Kingdom
- Education: University of Oxford (BA); University College of North Wales (PhD)
- Scientific career
- Workplaces: University College of North Wales; University of Wales Bangor; University of Michigan

Nick C. Ellis (born 12 May 1953) is a Welsh psycholinguist, professor emeritus of psychology and linguistics, and research scientist at the University of Michigan. Widely cited in the field of applied linguistics, particularly second-language acquisition, his research focuses on statistical learning of language structures, documenting influences of word and pattern frequency on language learning and processing. His work aligns with usage-based approaches aimed at understanding how learners develop knowledge of the form-meaning relations (grammatical constructions) that comprise human language.

Ellis served as Editor in Chief of the academic journal Language Learning from 1998 to 2002 and General Editor of the journal from 2006-2020.

Ellis received the Distinguished Scholarship and Service Award from the American Association for Applied Linguistics in 2019.

== Education and early career ==
Ellis earned his Bachelor of Arts degree in psychology from the University of Oxford (Corpus Christi College) in 1974. He went on to complete his PhD in cognitive psychology at the University College of North Wales (now Bangor University) in 1978. At Bangor, Ellis collaborated with Tim Miles on studies of visual information processing in dyslexia and with R. A. Hennelly on assessment of working memory capacity (i.e., digit span) in bilingual individuals.

Following his doctoral studies, Ellis pursued a career in academia, specializing in reading acquisition, psycholinguistics and applied linguistics. He was a member of the psychology faculty at Bangor from 1978 to 2004, before moving to the University of Michigan in 2004.

== Scientific contributions ==
Ellis conducts research on second language acquisition and contributed to the field of applied linguistics through publications and studies that explore these topics. His work has provided insights into how individuals acquire and process language, both in native and non-native contexts. Ellis is notable for his interdisciplinary approach, integrating psychology and linguistics to advance understanding in second language acquisition. His work has influenced language education practices and informed the development of instructional materials and assessment tools.

Ellis studies language as a complex, dynamic system that emerges from the interplay of social interaction, language experience (input), and general purpose learning mechanisms (e.g., working memory, statistical learning). He views constructions, i.e., conventionalized form-meaning pairings, as the building blocks of linguistic representation and knowledge, learned via exposure to richly structured language input. In the context of second language acquisition, Ellis proposes the Associative-Cognitive CREED––that language learning is Construction-based, Rational, Exemplar-based, Emergent, and Dialectic, and underpinned by the same associative and cognitive learning mechanisms as the rest of human knowledge.

Ellis has engaged deeply in debates about the role of explicit versus implicit learning and memory in language acquisition. According to Ellis and others including Arthur Reber, humans acquire most of their linguistic knowledge implicitly in the context of everyday social interaction. That is, humans learn to use language to communicate in myriad contexts without conscious awareness of the complex structures, grammatical patterns, and statistical regularities present in the system as a whole. Through routine usage, linguistic knowledge becomes entrenched, allowing it to be retrieved fluently and automatically as needed. In turn, such entrenched knowledge may interfere with successful acquisition of a new language by making it more difficult to notice unfamiliar patterns. Consequently, explicit instruction may facilitate second language acquisition by drawing the learner's attention to critical language structures and contrasts.

== Books ==
- Brown, G. D. A. & Ellis N. C. (Eds.) (1994). Handbook of spelling: Theory, process and intervention. Wiley. ISBN 978-0471943426
- Ellis, N. C. (Ed.) (1995). Implicit and explicit learning of languages. Academic Press. ISBN 978-0122374753
- Ellis, N. C. & Larsen-Freeman, D. (Eds.) (2010). Language as a complex adaptive system. Wiley-Blackwell. ISBN 978-1444334005
- Ellis, N. C., Römer, U., & Brook O'Donnell, M. (2016). Usage-based approaches to language acquisition and processing: Cognitive and corpus investigations of construction grammar. Wiley-Blackwell. ISBN 978-1119296522
- Ortega, L., Cumming, A., & Ellis, N. C. (Eds.) (2013). Agendas for language learning research. Wiley-Blackwell. ISBN 978-1118590706
- Robinson, P. & Ellis N. C. (Eds.) (2008). Handbook of cognitive linguistics and second language acquisition. Routledge. ISBN 978-0-8058-5351-3

== Representative articles ==
- Ellis, N. C. (1996). Sequencing in SLA: Phonological memory, chunking, and points of order. Studies in Second Language Acquisition, 18(1), 91-126. doi:10.1017/S0272263100014698
- Ellis, N. C. (1998). Emergentism, connectionism and language learning. Language Learning, 48(4), 631-664. doi:10.1111/0023-8333.00063
- Ellis, N. C. (2002). Frequency effects in language processing: A review with implications for theories of implicit and explicit language acquisition. Studies in Second Language Acquisition, 24(2), 143-188. doi:10.1017/S0272263102002024
- Ellis, N. C. (2005). At the interface: Dynamic interactions of explicit and implicit language knowledge. Studies in Second Language Acquisition, 27(2), 305-352. doi:10.1017/S027226310505014X
- Ellis, N. C. (2006). Selective attention and transfer phenomena in L2 acquisition: Contingency, cue competition, salience, interference, overshadowing, blocking, and perceptual learning. Applied Linguistics, 27(2), 164–194. doi:10.1093/applin/aml015
