= Michael Long (linguist) =

American psycholinguist

Michael Hugh Long (1945 – February 21, 2021) was an American psycholinguist. He was a Professor of Second Language Acquisition at the University of Maryland, College Park. Long introduced the concept of focus on form, which entails bringing linguistic elements (e.g., vocabulary, grammatical structures, collocations) to students’ attention within the larger context of a meaning-based lesson in order to anticipate or correct problems in comprehension or production of the target language. Long contrasted this approach with the older method of focus on forms, which calls for exclusive focus on the linguistic forms when teaching a target language, often consisting of drill-type exercises such as conjugation exercises. Long is also usually credited for introducing the interaction hypothesis, a theory of second language acquisition which places importance on face-to-face interaction.

== Career ==
He received an LL.B. (Bachelor of Laws) degree from the University of Birmingham and a Post Graduate Certificate from the Department of English as a foreign language in Education from the Institute of Education, University of London. He then received a M.A. in Applied Linguistics from the University of Essex and a Ph.D. from the University of California, Los Angeles, also in Applied Linguistics. His first academic position was at the University of Pennsylvania. He remained there for three years before leaving for the University of Hawaii at Manoa, and he later accepted a position at the University of Maryland, College Park in 2005.

== Books written ==
- Long, M. H. (1977). Face to Face. London: Evans Bros.
- Long, M. H., Allen, W., Cyr, A., Lemelin, C., Ricard, E., Spada, N., & Vogel, P (1980). Reading English for Academic Study. Rowley, Mass.: Newbury House, 1980.
- Larsen-Freeman, D., & Long, M. H. (1991). An introduction to second language acquisition Research. London: Longman. (Spanish translation, 1994; Japanese translation, 1996; Chinese edition, 2000).
- Long, M. H., Problems in SLA. Mahwah, NJ: Lawrence Erlbaum Associates, 2007.
- Long, Mike. (2015). Second Language Acquisition and Task-Based Language Teaching. Wiley-Blackwell.
- Jordan, G., & Long, M.H. (2022). English Language Teaching Now and How It Could Be. Cambridge Scholars Publishing.

== Books edited ==
- Krashen, S. Scarcella, R. C., & Long, M. H. (eds.), Child-adult differences in second language acquisition. Rowley, Mass.: Newbury House, 1982.
- Seliger, H. W., & Long, M. H. (eds.), Classroom-oriented research on second language acquisition. Rowley, Mass.: Newbury House, 1983.
- Bailey, K. M., Long, M. H., & Peck, S. (eds.), Second language acquisition studies. Rowley, Mass.: Newbury House, 1983.
- Long, M. H., & Richards, J. C. (eds.) Methodology in TESOL: A reader. Rowley, Mass.: Newbury House, 1987.
- Doughty, C. J., & Long, M. H. (eds.). Handbook of second language acquisition. Oxford: Blackwell, 2003. (paperback edition, 2005)
- Long, M. H. (ed.), Second language needs analysis. Cambridge: Cambridge University Press, 2005.
- Long, M. H. and Doughty, C. J. (eds.), Handbook of language teaching. Oxford: Blackwell, 2009.

== Technical reports ==
- Long, M. H., Brock, C., Crookes, G., Deicke, C., Potter, L., & Zhang, S. (1984). The effect of teachers' questioning patterns and wait‑time on pupil participation in public high school classes in Hawaii for students of limited English proficiency. Technical Report No. 1. Honolulu: Center for Second Language Classroom Research, Social Science Research Institute, University of Hawai’i at Manoa, 1984.
- Long, M. H. (1985). Bibliography of Research on Second Language Classroom Processes and Classroom Second Language Acquisition. Technical Report No. 2. Honolulu: Center for Second Language Classroom Research, Social Science Research Institute, University of Hawai’i at Manoa.
- Chaudron, C., Crookes, G., & Long, M. H. (1988). Reliability and validity in second language classroom research. Technical Report No. 8. Honolulu: Center for Second Language Classroom Research, Social Science Research Institute, University of Hawai’i at Manoa.

== Other publications ==
He has also written over 40 book chapters and over 25 peer-reviewed articles. One of his articles, Yano, Y., Long, M. H., & Ross, S. (1994). "The effects of simplified and elaborated texts on foreign language reading comprehension." Language Learning 44, 2, 189-219, was awarded TESOL’s International Research Prize for 1994.

He also participated on the podcast LdeLengua with an interview in Spanish about his focus on form and second-language acquisition.
