= Conn R. Ó Cléirigh =

Irish linguist (1927–1995)

Conn R. Ó Cléirigh (7 February 1927 - 30 April 1995) was an Irish Professor of Linguistics.

== Education ==
Ó Cléirigh received a BA in Celtic Studies in 1949 from University College Dublin. He started his postgraduate studies in Sanskrit and Indo-European languages at Dublin Institute for Advanced Studies. He was a postgraduate student and Irish assistant the Bangor University. At the University of Zurich he studied Celtic philology and the Germanic, Indo-European, Indo-Iranian, and Hittite languages. He studied under Julius Pokorny and later wrote his obituary in Celtica (journal). He received an MA from the National University of Ireland in 1955.

== Career ==
He was appointed assistant lecturer in the Welsh Department in 1954 and became lecturer of early and middle Irish from 1957. He was a visiting professor at University of California, Los Angeles in 1964-1965. Ó Cleirigh was the appointed as the first chair of linguistics in ireland and served two terms as dean of faculty of the faculty of Celtic studies.

He was appointed chairman of Institúid Teangeolaíochta Éireann in 1972.

== Death and legacy ==
He died in Dublin in 1995. A Festschrift was published in his honour titled 'Dán do oide: essays in memory of Conn R. Ó Cléirigh, 1927–1995'.

== Politics ==
He was chairman of the Dublin regional council of the Labour Party (Ireland).
