= Alison Wray =

Welsh linguist (born 1960)

Education
- Education: University of York

Philosophical work
- Institutions: Cardiff University
- Main interests: Formulaic language
- Notable works: Formulaic Language: Pushing the Boundaries
- Notable ideas: Lexical chunk, Evolution of language, psycholinguistic theory

Alison Wray (born 1960) FAcSS FLSW is a Research Professor in Language and Communication at Cardiff University in the United Kingdom. She is known for her work on formulaic language.

== Career ==
Wray has been teaching at Cardiff University since 1999. She has also taught at Swansea University, York St John University, University College of Ripon and York St John. Her BA (1983) and D.Phil. (1988) degrees (both in Linguistics) are from the University of York.

Besides her work on formulaic language, Wray is interested in language profiling, evolution of language and psycholinguistic theory. She also investigates language patterns in people with dementia. Her book, The Dynamics of Dementia Communication (Wray 2020) won the 2021 Book Prize of the British Association for Applied Linguistics and was runner up in the American Association for Applied Linguistics Book Award 2021-22.

In 2014, Wray was elected a Fellow of the Learned Society of Wales.

== Selected works ==
- Formulaic Language: Pushing the Boundaries (2008)
- Formulaic Language and the Lexicon (2002)
- Wray, Alison (ed.) (2002). Transition to Language. Oxford University Press UK.
- The Dynamics of Dementia Communication (2020) Oxford University Press.
