= Maria Teresa Guasti =

Psycholinguist

Maria Teresa Guasti is a linguist specializing in language acquisition. She is professor of linguistics and psycholinguistics at the University of Milano-Bicocca.

== Education and career ==
Before her academic career, Guasti worked in information technology, first as a researcher at Olivetti in Turin (1984–5) and then as a software developer for Fininvest in Milan (1985–7). From 1988 to 1994 Guasti worked as a research assistant at the University of Geneva, where she received her doctorate for a dissertation focusing on causatives and verbs of perception.

Guasti's first academic job after her doctorate was as a researcher at the San Raffaele Hospital in Milan (1994–7), where she began to combine her interest in linguistic theory with the study of language acquisition. After a period of postdoctoral research at the University of Siena (1997–2000), she was appointed assistant professor of linguistics and psycholinguistics at the University of Milano-Bicocca, where she was to spend the rest of her career; she was promoted to full professor in 2005.

== Research and honours ==
Guasti's research focuses on child language acquisition of syntax, semantics and pragmatics. She studies both monolingual and multilingual acquisition, looking at typically developing populations as well as populations with developmental language disorders, dyslexia or cochlear implants. Her 2002 book Language acquisition: the growth of grammar has been described as ‘the most comprehensive piece of work ... on first language acquisition within the generative tradition’. It is now in its second edition (2017), and has been cited well over a thousand times.

Guasti has been the recipient of numerous honours and awards. In 2019 she was awarded an ERC Synergy Grant for the project ‘Realizing Leibniz’s Dream: Child Languages as a Mirror of the Mind’ together with Artemis Alexiadou and Uli Sauerland; the project runs from 2020 to 2026. In 2021 she was elected ordinary member of the Academia Europaea.

== Selected publications ==
- Guasti, Maria Teresa. 1993. Verb syntax in Italian child grammar: finite and nonfinite verbs. Language Acquisition 3 (1), 1–40. doi:10.1207/s15327817la0301_1
- Guasti, Maria Teresa. 1993. Causative and perception verbs: a comparative study. Turin: Rosenberg & Sellier. ISBN 9788870115567
- Chierchia, Gennaro, Stephen Crain, Maria Teresa Guasti, Andrea Gualmini & Luisa Meroni. 2001. The acquisition of disjunction: Evidence for a grammatical view of scalar implicatures. Proceedings of the 25th Boston University conference on language development (BUCLD), 157–168. Somerville, MA: Cascadilla Press.
- Guasti, Maria Teresa, Gennaro Chierchia, Stephen Crain, Francesca Foppolo, Andrea Gualmini & Luisa Meroni. 2005. Why children and adults sometimes (but not always) compute implicatures. Language and cognitive processes 20 (5), 667–696. doi:10.1080/01690960444000250
- Guasti, Maria Teresa. 2017. Language acquisition: the growth of grammar, second edition. Cambridge, MA: MIT Press. ISBN 9780230240780
