= Bill VanPatten =

American academic

Bill VanPatten is a former Professor of Spanish and Second Language Acquisition at Michigan State University. He specializes in second language acquisition, which he investigates on both theoretical and practical levels, using techniques from psycholinguistics, applied linguistics, and cognitive psychology.

== Research ==
VanPatten was the creator of the educational television show Destinos, designed for use with Spanish courses.

He worked with the theory of input processing in second language acquisition, which aims to explain how L2 learners process input. This term was first used by Professor Bill VanPatten. Growing up in a multilingual home, he strongly believes in the significant benefits of being able to speak, read, and write multiple languages. VanPatten considered that most people view language as something static, assuming that practicing rules will eventually make them stick in one's mind.

However, VanPatten believes that learning a language involves first processing language through hearing and reading to gather enough data to build up the linguistic system over time. To exemplify this theory, VanPatten explains that giving people a couple of chunks of language and having them do something with them allows them to process language, thus demonstrating how language develops in the brain.

== Bibliography ==
- Dust Storm: Stories from Lubbock
- From Input To Output: A Teacher's Guide to Second Language Acquisition
- Making Communicative Language Teaching Happen (with James F. Lee)
- Theories in Second Language Acquisition: An Introduction (with Jessica Williams)
- Key Terms in Second Language Acquisition (with Alessandro G. Benati)
- Studies in Second Language Acquisition (with Susan Gass)
- Research in Second Language Processing and Parsing" (with Jill Jegerski)
