= Task-based language teaching =

Pedagogical approach

Task-based language teaching (TBLT), also known as task-based instruction (TBI), focuses on the use of authentic language to complete meaningful tasks in the target language. Such tasks can include visiting a doctor, conducting an interview, or calling customer service for help. Assessment is primarily based on task outcomes (the appropriate completion of real-world tasks) rather than on accuracy of prescribed language forms. This makes TBLT especially popular for developing target language fluency and student confidence. As such, TBLT can be considered a branch of communicative language teaching (CLT). In this approach, learners are assessed on their ability to complete the task successfully rather than on the accurate use of specific grammatical forms.

Task-based language learning has its origins in communicative language teaching, and is a subcategory of it. Educators adopted task-based language learning for a variety of reasons. Some moved to a task-based syllabus in an attempt to develop learner capacity to express meaning, while others wanted to make language in the classroom truly communicative, rather than the pseudo-communication that results from classroom activities with no direct connection to real-life situations. Others, like Prabhu in the Bangalore Project, thought that tasks were a way of tapping into learners' natural mechanisms for second-language acquisition, and weren't concerned with real-life communication per se.

TBLT was popularized by N. S. Prabhu while working in Bangalore, India, according to Jeremy Harmer. Prabhu noticed that his students could learn language just as easily with a non-linguistic problem as when they were concentrating on linguistic questions.Recent scholarship, particularly within the Brazilian context, has sought to merge Prabhu’s framework with critical pedagogy, proposing that tasks serve an "emancipatory" function by allowing students to resist the status quo. Major scholars who have done research in this area include Teresa P. Pica, Martin East, and Michael Long.

== Definition of a task ==
A concept, earlier known as the "communicative activity" in 1970s and 1980s was later replaced by the term task has since been defined differently by different scholars. Willis (1996) has defined a task as a goal based activity involving the use of the learners' existing language resources, that leads to the outcome. Examples include playing games, and solving problems and puzzles etc. Ellis (2003) defines a task as a work plan that involves a pragmatic processing of language, using the learners' existing language resources and attention to meaning, and resulting in the completion of an outcome which can be assessed for its communicative function. David Nunan (2004) draws upon the definitions given by other experts, of two types of tasks: target tasks and pedagogical tasks. Targets tasks refer to doing something outside the classroom and in the real world; whereas pedagogical tasks refer to the tasks students perform inside the classroom and in response to target language input or processing. Nunan concludes that target tasks may be non-linguistic. He defines pedagogical task as a classroom activity that involves a student to understand and produce the target language while focusing on conveying the meaning and not being too concerned with form. On the other hand, Long (1985) defines a task as things people do in everyday life.

According to Rod Ellis, a task has four main characteristics:

1. A task involves a primary focus on (pragmatic) meaning.
2. A task has some kind of ‘gap’. (Prabhu identified the three main types as information gap, reasoning gap, and opinion gap.) Modern critical approaches expand this to include a "perspective gap," which centers on a conflict of worldviews or cultural dilemmas rather than a mere lack of information.
3. The participants choose the linguistic resources needed to complete the task.
4. A task has a clearly defined, non-linguistic outcome.

== In practice ==
The core of the lesson or project is, as the name suggests, the task. Teachers and curriculum developers should bear in mind that any attention to form, i.e., grammar or vocabulary, increases the likelihood that learners may be distracted from the task itself and become preoccupied with detecting and correcting errors and/or looking up language in dictionaries and grammar references. Although there may be several effective frameworks for creating a task-based learning lesson, here is a basic outline:

=== Pre-task ===
In the pre-task, the teacher will present what will be expected from the students in the task phase. Additionally, in the "weak" form of TBLT, the teacher may prime the students with key vocabulary or grammatical constructs, although this can mean that the activity is, in effect, more similar to the more traditional present-practice-produce (PPP) paradigm. In "strong" task-based learning lessons, learners are responsible for selecting the appropriate language for any given context themselves. The instructors may also present a model of the task by either doing it themselves or by presenting picture, audio, or video demonstrating the task. In a critical task cycle, this stage is often preceded by a critical needs analysis to ensure the theme—such as gender representation or media bias—is relevant to the students' specific social reality. Furthermore, teachers may curate "deliberately incomplete" authentic inputs, such as biased magazine covers, to provoke critical inquiry.

=== Task ===
During the task phase, the students perform the task, typically in small groups, although this depends on the type of activity. Unless the teacher plays a particular role in the task, the teacher's role is typically limited to one of an observer or counselor—thereby making it a more student-centered methodology. When implemented from a critical perspective, the teacher also acts as a mediator of "critical dialogue," using the task to facilitate the co-construction of knowledge and the "naming" of social realities.

=== Review ===
If learners have created tangible linguistic products, e.g. text, montage, presentation, audio or video recording, learners can review each other's work and offer constructive feedback. If a task is set to extend over longer periods of time, e.g. weeks, and includes iterative cycles of constructive activity followed by review, TBLT can be seen as analogous to Project-based learning. In critical frameworks, this review culminates in a "Third Space" outcome—a tangible artifact like an infographic or a social media narrative that materializes the group’s negotiation of complex cultural meanings.

== Types of task ==
According to N. S. Prabhu, there are three main categories of task: information-gap, reasoning-gap, and opinion-gap.

Information-gap activity, which involves a transfer of given information from one person to another – or from one form to another, or from one place to another – generally calling for the decoding or encoding of information from or into language. One example is pair work in which each member of the pair has a part of the total information (for example an incomplete picture) and attempts to convey it verbally to the other. Another example is completing a tabular representation with information available in a given piece of text. The activity often involves selection of relevant information as well, and learners may have to meet criteria of completeness and correctness in making the transfer.

Reasoning-gap activity, which involves deriving some new information from given information through processes of inference, deduction, practical reasoning, or a perception of relationships or patterns. One example is working out a teacher's timetable on the basis of given class timetables. Another is deciding what course of action is best (for example cheapest or quickest) for a given purpose and within given constraints. The activity necessarily involves comprehending and conveying information, as in an information-gap activity, but the information to be conveyed is not identical with that initially comprehended. There is a piece of reasoning which connects the two.

Opinion-gap activity, which involves identifying and articulating a personal preference, feeling, or attitude in response to a given situation. One example is story completion; another is taking part in the discussion of a social issue. The activity may involve using factual information and formulating arguments to justify one's opinion, but there is no objective procedure for demonstrating outcomes as right or wrong, and no reason to expect the same outcome from different individuals or on different occasions. Contemporary critical task cycles often utilize these categories to promote Critical Media Literacy, asking students to analyze stereotypical portrayals of Africa or gender roles in technical fields and create "counter-discourses" to transform their local reality.

== Cognitive Accounts ==
Cognitive accounts of TBLT examine how learners allocate mental resources such as attention and memory during tasks, focusing on how task design influences language performance and learning. Two influential models dominate this approach: Peter Skehan’s Limited Attentional Capacity Model (Trade-Off Hypothesis) and Peter Robinson’s Cognition Hypothesis (Multiple Resource Model). These models offer contrasting explanations of how cognitive load and task complexity interact with linguistic performance.

=== Limited Attentional Capacity Model (Trade-Off Hypothesis) ===
Skehan’s model assumes that learners have a single, limited attentional pool, meaning that focusing on one aspect of language (e.g., meaning) detracts from others (e.g., accuracy or complexity). This trade-off hypothesis suggests that increasing task complexity strains available cognitive resources, leading learners to prioritize some linguistic dimensions at the expense of others.

Skehan and Foster identified three key task characteristics that influence cognitive load:

- Code Complexity: Linguistic demands, such as vocabulary and syntax.
- Cognitive Complexity: Conceptual and reasoning demands.
- Communicative Stress: External factors like time pressure and participant roles.

To mitigate cognitive overload, Skehan advocates using pre-task planning and task repetition, which allow learners to manage cognitive demands and allocate more attention to linguistic accuracy and complexity.

=== Cognition Hypothesis (Multiple Resource Model) ===
In contrast, Robinson argues that cognition is supported by multiple attentional resource pools. His Cognition Hypothesis posits that increasing task complexity does not necessarily result in trade-offs but can stimulate deeper processing, leading to simultaneous gains in accuracy and complexity.

Robinson’s Triadic Componential Framework classifies task complexity factors into:

- Resource-Directing Variables: Elements that push attention toward linguistic form (e.g., reasoning demands, number of elements).
- Resource-Dispersing Variables: Factors that impose general cognitive load but do not inherently direct attention to language (e.g., time pressure, background knowledge requirements).

Unlike Skehan, Robinson suggests that learners can mobilize additional cognitive resources when engaged in complex tasks, particularly if task sequencing is structured to gradually increase cognitive demands. Based on this model, Robinson proposed the SSARC (Stabilize, Simplify, Automate, Restructure, and Complexify) framework. It provides a principled approach to task sequencing, ensuring that learners engage with tasks in a manner that optimizes cognitive development and language acquisition.

In cognitive TBLT research, performance outcomes on tasks are often evaluated by CAF measures as proxies for cognitive effort and learning. The rationale is that changes in complexity, accuracy, and fluency under different task conditions can signal how learners allocate their cognitive resources. For instance, if a more complex task leads to a drop in fluency but an increase in complexity and accuracy of language, it might suggest learners devoted more attention to formulating process at the expense of processing speed – a pattern consistent with the cognition hypothesis. Researchers have even mapped CAF dimensions onto stages of psycholinguistic processing (e.g. Levelt’s speech production model) to interpret task effects.

=== Critiques and Recent Developments ===
Recent empirical findings have provided mixed support for both models. Some studies confirm trade-offs in linguistic performance under high task complexity (supporting Skehan), while others show simultaneous improvement in accuracy and complexity (aligning with Robinson’s view). Some researchers critique the CAF-based investigation, arguing that it fails to measure cognitive processes and instead offers just a performance-based proxy. Emprical studies have reported cases where performance does not correspond to the underlying processing, highlighting significant issues in linking CAF measures to cognitive processes.

To address these limitations, it is argued that TBLT researchers should dedicate more effort to examining the actual cognitive processes learners engage in during tasks. Researchers have incorporated alternative methodologies, including:

- Think-Aloud Protocols AND keystroke-logging: Capturing learners’ cognitive focus in real time.
- Dual-Task and Eye-Tracking Studies: Measuring cognitive load and attention shifts during task performance.
- Subjective Cognitive Load Measures: Assessing learners’ perceived effort and processing demands.

These approaches highlight the need for more pricise analyses beyond CAF to understand the cognitive mechanisms underlying TBLT. While Skehan and Robinson’s models remain central to cognitive TBLT research, ongoing studies emphasize the importance of integrating psycholinguistic, neurolinguistic, and real-time cognitive data to refine our understanding of how task complexity influences second language acquisition.

== Sociocultural Accounts ==
Sociocultural accounts emphasize the importance of the roles of social interaction, context, and collaboration in tasks. From a sociocultural perspective (Vygotskian viewpoint), a task is an artifact that mediates social learning through dialogue and joint activity. Researchers like Lantolf, Swain, and others have examined how peer interaction during tasks can scaffold performance beyond a learner’s solo ability (the Zone of Proximal Development).

Moreover, dynamic and complexity theories from cognitive science have started influencing TBLT research. Rather than viewing task performance in a linear cause-effect way, some researchers adopt a complex dynamic systems perspective, where language performance is seen as the outcome of many interacting variables adapting over time. From this viewpoint, tasks are “microecologies” for language use, and learners continuously adapt by reallocating cognitive resources as tasks unfold. For example, a learner might initially struggle with a task’s complexity but then adjust their approach or heuristics mid-task to cope, leading to non-linear performance patterns. Such research often uses dense data tracking and analysis of variability in performance rather than simple pre- vs. post-test measures. While this approach is still developing, it represents a recent trend to complement traditional cognitive models with a more holistic, dynamic understanding of task-based learning processes.

== Reception ==
According to Jon Larsson, in considering problem-based learning for language learning, i.e., task-based language learning:

...one of the main virtues of PBL is that it displays a significant advantage over traditional methods in how the communicative skills of the students are improved. The general ability of social interaction is also positively affected. These are, most will agree, two central factors in language learning. By building a language course around assignments that require students to act, interact and communicate it is hopefully possible to mimic some of the aspects of learning a language “on site”, i.e. in a country where it is actually spoken. Seeing how learning a language in such an environment is generally much more effective than teaching the language exclusively as a foreign language, this is something that would hopefully be beneficial.

Larsson goes on to say:

Another large advantage of PBL is that it encourages students to gain a deeper sense of understanding. Superficial learning is often a problem in language education, for example when students, instead of acquiring a sense of when and how to use which vocabulary, learn all the words they will need for the exam next week and then promptly forget them.
In a PBL classroom this is combatted by always introducing the vocabulary in a real-world situation, rather than as words on a list, and by activating the student; students are not passive receivers of knowledge, but are instead required to actively acquire the knowledge. The feeling of being an integral part of their group also motivates students to learn in a way that the prospect of a final examination rarely manages to do.

Task-based learning benefits students because it is more student-centered, allows for more meaningful communication, and often provides for practical extra-linguistic skill building. As the tasks are likely to be familiar to the students (e.g.: visiting the doctor), students are more likely to be engaged, which may further motivate them in their language learning.

According to Jeremy Harmer, tasks promote language acquisition through the types of language and interaction they require. Harmer says that although the teacher may present language in the pre-task, the students are ultimately free to use what grammar constructs and vocabulary they want. This allows them, he says, to use all the language they know and are learning, rather than just the 'target language' of the lesson. On the other hand, according to Loschky and Bley-Vroman, tasks can also be designed to make certain target forms 'task-essential,' thus making it communicatively necessary for students to practice using them. In terms of interaction, information gap tasks in particular have been shown to promote negotiation of meaning and output modification.

According to Plews and Zhao, task-based language learning can suffer in practice from poorly informed implementation and adaptations that alter its fundamental nature. They say that lessons are frequently changed to be more like traditional teacher-led presentation-practice-production lessons than task-based lessons.

== Professional conferences and organizations ==
As an outgrowth of the widespread interest in task-based teaching, the Biennial International Conference on Task-Based Language Teaching has occurred every other year since 2005. Past conferences have been held in Belgium, the United States, England, New Zealand, Canada, with the 2017 conference scheduled to take place in Barcelona, Spain. These events promote theoretical and practical research on TBLT. In addition, the Japan Association for Language Teaching has a special interest group devoted to task-based learning, which has also hosted its own conference in Japan. The 11th International Conference on Task-Based Language Teaching (TBLT) is held in Groningen from April 2 to 4, 2025.

l=JALT l=JALT Task-Based Language Teaching (TBLT), also known as task-based instruction (TBI), is a pedagogical approach focusing on the use of authentic language and on asking students to do meaningful tasks using the target language. Such tasks can include visiting a doctor, conducting an interview, or calling customer service for help. Assessment is primarily based on task outcome (i.e. the appropriate completion of real-world tasks) rather than on accuracy of prescribed language forms. This makes TBLT especially popular for developing target language fluency and student confidence. Core Principles TBLT is grounded in the principles of communicative language teaching (CLT) and constructivist learning theory. The main principles include:

Meaning Over Form: The primary focus is on communication and exchanging meaning, rather than focusing strictly on grammatical structures.
Authenticity: Tasks are designed to mimic real-world interactions that students are likely to encounter outside the classroom.
Scaffolding: Teachers provide linguistic and structural support before, during, and after the task to help learners succeed.

The TBLT Framework According to linguist Jane Willis, a standard TBLT lesson is structured into three main phases: 1. Pre-Task The teacher introduces the topic, sets the scenario, and defines the task clear objectives. Learners are exposed to relevant vocabulary, phrases, or model texts to prepare them for execution. 2. Task Cycle

Task: Students perform the task in pairs or small groups using their existing linguistic resources.
Planning: Students prepare a brief report (verbal or written) to explain to the class how they solved or completed the task.
Report: Students present their findings or outcomes to the rest of the class.

3. Language Focus

Analysis: The teacher highlights specific linguistic forms, grammar points, or vocabulary items used during the task.
Practice: Students conduct practice exercises to reinforce the newly analyzed language structures.

Advantages

It provides a natural environment for second language acquisition.
It increases student motivation by utilizing real-life, relevant contexts.
It encourages collaborative learning and communication skills.

References 1 Nunan, D. (2004). Task-Based Language Teaching. Cambridge University Press. 2 Willis, J. (1996). A Framework for Task-Based Learning. Longman. 3 Ellis, R. (2003). Task-based Language Learning and Teaching. Oxford University Press.

== See also ==
- Communicative language teaching
- Content-based instruction
- Content and language integrated learning
- English as a second or foreign language
- Input hypothesis
- Problem-based learning
- Project-based learning
- Second-language acquisition
