= H. Douglas Brown =

American linguist (1941–2026)

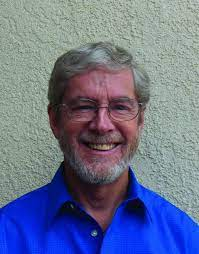
H. Douglas Brown

H. Douglas Brown (1941–2026) was an American linguist and professor emeritus of English as a Second Language at San Francisco State University. He served as president of International TESOL from 1980 to 1981, and in 2001 he received TESOL's James E. Alatis Award for Distinguished Service. Brown died in 2026.

== Notable books ==
- Brown, H. D. & Lee, H. (2025). Principles of Language Learning and Teaching (7th Edition). Routledge.
- Brown, H. D., & Abeywickrama, P. (2019). Language Assessment: Principles and Classroom Practices (2nd Edition). Pearson Education ESL.
- Brown, H. D., & Lee, H. (2015). Teaching by Principles: An Interactive Approach to Language Pedagogy (4th Edition). Pearson Education ESL.
- Brown, H. D. (2014). Principles of Language Learning and Teaching (6th Edition). Pearson Education ESL.
