= Studies in Second Language Acquisition =

- Discipline: Linguistics
- Language: English
- Edited by: Albert Valdman; Susan Gass

Publication details
- History: 1978–present
- Publisher: Cambridge University Press (United Kingdom)
- Frequency: Quarterly
- Open access: 1978–1996
- Impact factor: 2.044 (2016)

Standard abbreviations
- ISO 4: Stud. Second Lang. Acquis.

Indexing
- ISSN: 0272-2631 (print); 1470-1545 (web)
- LCCN: 81642978
- OCLC no.: 4536243

Links
- Journal homepage

Studies in Second Language Acquisition is a peer-reviewed journal published quarterly by Cambridge University Press. The editors for 2008 were Albert Valdman of Indiana University and Susan Gass of Michigan State University.

According to the Journal Citation Reports, the journal has a 2016 impact factor of 2.044.

== See also ==
- Second language acquisition
