= Larry Selinker =

American linguist

Larry Selinker (September 19, 1937 – May 10, 2026) was the professor emeritus of linguistics at the University of Michigan and former director of the university's English Language Institute. In 1972, Selinker introduced the concept of interlanguage, which built upon Pit Corder's previous work on the nature of language learners' errors. Corder's and Selinker's work became the foundation of modern research into second-language acquisition, and interlanguage is accepted as a basic principle of the discipline.

== Education ==
Selinker received his B.A. from Brandeis University in 1959, where he studied Near-Eastern studies. He received his M.A. from The American University in 1960, in the subject of linguistics. Selinker studied at Georgetown University for his doctorate, which he received in 1966.

== Career ==
After completing his PhD, Selinker moved to the University of Washington, where he became assistant professor of linguistics and director of English for foreign students from 1966 to 1975. From 1968 to 1969 he was a Fulbright scholar at the University of Edinburgh, where he researched the psycholinguistics of second-language acquisition. He left Washington in 1975, when he earned a Fulbright scholarship at the Hebrew University of Jerusalem. In Jerusalem, Selinker focused on advanced reading for second-language learners. In 1976–1977 he taught at San Jose State University.

Selinker moved to the University of Michigan in 1977, and he remained there until his retirement in 1993. During his time in Michigan he served as a visiting professor at Carnegie Mellon University in 1991, and spent his third Fulbright scholarship at the University of Kassel in Germany in 1992.

Following his career at Michigan, Selinker was appointed to a chair at Birkbeck College, University of London. There he served a turn as Head of the Department of Applied Linguistics, taught second language acquisition and supervised student research – both undergraduate and postgraduate.

== Interlanguage ==
Selinker's most well-known contribution to the field of second-language acquisition is the concept of interlanguage. He first introduced interlanguage in his 1972 paper of the same name, which built on Pit Corder's 1967 article The Significance of Learners' Errors. Selinker's paper only mentioned Corder's in passing, but it nevertheless advanced his basic argument.

The principle behind interlanguage theory is that the language of second-language learners is governed by systematic rules, and that these rules are different from those of the language being learned and from those of the learner's native language. Hence at every stage of learning, language learners do not merely copy what native speakers do, but create an entirely new language system unique to themselves. Selinker named this interim language system an interlanguage.

In his 1972 paper, Selinker proposed that interlanguages have all the normal properties of natural languages. In other words, they are systematic and bound by rules in the same manner as any other language. Furthermore, Selinker proposed that interlanguage is based on three basic principles: over-generalization from patterns found in the language being learned, transfer from patterns found in the learner's native language, and fossilization, the phenomenon of a learner's language ceasing to develop.
