= British Association for Applied Linguistics =

British learned society

The British Association for Applied Linguistics (BAAL) is a learned society, based in the UK, which provides a forum for people interested in language and applied linguistics.

BAAL organises regular meetings of its members at various venues in the UK, publishes conference proceedings, issues a regular newsletter and awards student scholarships. There is an elected Executive Committee (EC) that represents the interests of members. The current chair is Professor Zhu Hua of UCL Institute of Education.

BAAL has an international membership of over 1200 members and is a registered charity in the UK (Charity number 246800).

== Activities ==
BAAL organises scientific meetings. It supports applied linguistics activity. It brings together the applied linguistics community viaBAALmail, its dedicated webmail list, through which members share and discuss applied linguistics-related news, achievements and opportunities.

BAAL is also officially represented on the advisory board of the journal Applied Linguistics (Oxford University Press).

== Annual Conference ==
Since 1967 BAAL has held an annual conference. At the conference three prizes are awarded: the annual Book Prize, the Richard Pemberton prize for the best postgraduate student paper and a prize for the best poster presentation.

Recent conferences and conference themes

- 52nd – 29–31 August 2019, Manchester Metropolitan University: 'Broadening the Horizons of Applied Linguistics'.
- 51st – 6–8 September 2018, York St John University: 'Taking risks in applied linguistics'.
- 50th – 31 August-2 September 2017, University of Leeds: 'Diversity in Applied Linguistics: Opportunities, challenges, questions'.
- 49th – 1–3 September 2016, Anglia Ruskin University, Cambridge: 'Taking stock of Applied Linguistics: Where are we now?'
- 48th – 3–5 September 2015, Aston University, Birmingham: 'Breaking Theory: New Directions'.

== BAAL Book Prize winners, runners-up, and shortlists ==
Year	Title	Author	Publisher	Result
2025	Migration, Adult Language Learning and Multilingualism	Anna-Elisabeth Holm	Routledge/Taylor & Francis	Won
2025	Listening Without Borders: Creating Spaces for Encountering Difference	Magdalena Kubanyiova and Parinita Shetty	Multilingual Matters	Runner-up
2025	The Bloomsbury Handbook of Linguistic Landscapes	Robert Blackwood, Stefania Tufi and Will Amos	Bloomsbury Publishing	Runner-up
2025	Monolingual Policies in Multilingual Schools	Jürgen Jaspers	Oxford University Press	Shortlisted
2024	Engaging Children in Applied Linguistics Research	Annamaria Pinter	Cambridge University Press	Won
2024	Multilingual Families in a Digital Age: Mediational Repertoires and Transnational Practices	Kristin Vold Lexander and Jannis Androutsopoulos	Routledge	Runner-up
2024	Language, Discourse and Anxiety	Luke Collins and Paul Baker	Cambridge University Press	Shortlisted
2024	Political Activism in the Linguistic Landscape: Or, how to use Public Space as a Medium for Protest	Philip Seargeant, Korina Giaxoglou and Frank Monaghan	Multilingual Matters	Shortlisted
2024	Social Justice and the Language Classroom: Reflection, Action, and Transformation	Deniz Ortaçtepe Hart	Edinburgh University Press	Shortlisted
2024	The Handbook of Linguistic Human Rights	Tove Skutnabb-Kangas and Robert Phillipson	Wiley	Shortlisted
2023	Standards, Stigma, Surveillance: Raciolinguistic Ideologies and England's Schools.	Ian Cushing	Palgrave	Won
2023	Mobile-Assisted Language Learning: Concepts, Contexts and Challenges	Glenn Stockwell	Cambridge University Press	Runner-up
2023	Gender Diversity and Sexuality in English Language Education: New Transnational Voices	Darío Luis Banegas and Navan Govender	Bloomsbury	Runner-up
2023	Antisocial Language Teaching: English and the Pervasive Pathology of Whiteness	JPB Gerald	Multilingual Matters	Shortlisted
2023	The Inner World of Gatekeeping in Scholarly Publication	Pejman Habibie and Anna Kristina Hultgren	Palgrave Macmillan	Shortlisted
2023	Implicit and Explicit Language Attitudes	Robert M. McKenzie, Andrew McNeill	Routledge	Shortlisted
2022	Language as Symbolic Power	Claire Kramsch	Cambridge University Press	Won
2022	Community, Solidarity and Multilingualism in a Transnational Social Movement	Maria Rosa Garrido Sardà	Routledge	Runner-up
2022	Language in a Globalised World: Social Justice Perspectives on Mobility and Contact	Khawla Badwan	Palgrave Macmillan	Runner-up
2022	Linguistic Penalties and the Job Interview	Celia Roberts	Equinox	Shortlisted
2022	The Routledge Handbook of Language, Gender, and Sexuality	Jo Angouri and Judith Baxter	Routledge	Shortlisted
2022	Transcultural Voices: Narrating Hip Hop Culture in Complex Delhi	Jaspal Naveel Singh	Multilingual Matters	Shortlisted
2021	The Dynamics of Dementia Communication	Alison Wray	Oxford University Press	Won
2021	Academic Irregularities: Language and Neoliberalism in Higher Education	Liz Morrish & Helen Sauntson	Routledge	Runner-up
2021	Corpus, Discourse and Mental Health	Daniel Hunt and Gavin Brookes	Bloomsbury	Shortlisted
2021	Innovations and Challenges in Applied Linguistics from the Global South	Alastair Pennycook and Sinfree Makoni	Routledge	Shortlisted
2021	Ontologies of English: Conceptualising the Language for Learning, Teaching, and Assessment	Christopher J. Hall & Rachel Wicaksono	Cambridge University Press	Shortlisted
2020	Palgrave Handbook of Minority Languages and Communities	Gabrielle Hogan-Brun & Bernadette O'Rourke (eds.)	Palgrave Macmillan	Won
2019	Oxford Handbook of Language Policy and Planning	James W. Tollefson & Miguel Pérez-Milans (Eds.)	Oxford University Press	Won
2018	Posthumanist Applied Linguistics	Alastair Pennycook	Routledge	Won
2017	Linguistic Diversity and Social Justice: An Introduction to Applied Sociolinguistics.	Ingrid Piller	Oxford University Press	Won
2016	World Englishes: A Critical Analysis.	Mario Saraceni	Bloomsbury Academic	Won
2015	Translanguaging: Language, Bilingualism and Education.	O. Garcia & Li Wei	Palgrave Macmillan	Won
2014	Translingual practice: Global Englishes and Cosmopolitan Relations	Suresh Canagarajah	Routledge	Won

== Special Interest Groups (SIGs) ==
BAAL has a number of Special Interest Groups (SIGs), which meet regularly and provide opportunities for researchers to share, promote and develop work within specific areas of applied linguistics.

The current SIGs are:

- Corpus Linguistics
- English as an Additional Language [EAL]
- Health and Science Communication
- Intercultural Communication
- Language, Gender and Sexuality
- Language and New Media
- Language in Africa
- Language Learning and Teaching
- Language Policy
- Linguistic Ethnography Forum
- Linguistics and Knowledge about Language in Education (LKALE)
- Multilingualism
- Professional, Academic and Work-based Literacies (PAWBL)
- Testing, Evaluation and Assessment
- Vocabulary Studies

== History ==
BAAL was founded in the 1960s, as interest increased in the science of linguistics and its practical applications - for example, in language teaching and learning.

BAAL's creation was the result of a proposal by Peter Strevens, recently appointed to a new chair in Applied Linguistics at the University of Essex. At a preliminary meeting of interested parties at Birkbeck College in July 1965, a narrower remit was discussed than the wider set of issues that the Association would ultimately concern itself with. Initially, it was suggested that it might focus on language teaching and machine translation, but the first full meeting in 1967 at the University of Reading agreed to broaden the scope. BAAL emerged as the UK affiliate of AILA, with Pit Corder its first chair.

Membership was narrowly defined in the early years, but a feeling that the Association could afford to widen recruitment was apparent by the early 1970s. In 1985, a requirement for formal qualifications, already flexible, was dropped; and today anyone can join.

The BAAL Archive is housed in the Centre for Applied Linguistics, University of Warwick.

== See also ==
- Language acquisition
