= Applied Linguistics (journal) =

- Discipline: Applied linguistics
- Language: English
- Edited by: Glenn Martinez, Ron Martinez

Publication details
- History: 1980–present
- Publisher: Oxford University Press
- Frequency: Quarterly
- Impact factor: 5.741 (2020)

Standard abbreviations
- ISO 4: Appl. Linguist.

Indexing
- ISSN: 0142-6001 (print); 1477-450X (web)
- LCCN: 81643225
- OCLC no.: 643108697

Links
- Journal homepage

Applied Linguistics is a peer-reviewed academic journal in the field of applied linguistics established in 1980 and published by Oxford University Press. It appears six times a year. The current co-editors are Glenn Martinez (University of Texas at San Antonio) and Ron Martinez (University of Oklahoma).

According to the Journal Citation Reports, the journal had a 2020 impact factor of 5.741.

== Aims and scope ==
The journal publishes both research papers and conceptual articles in all aspects of applied linguistics, such as lexicography, corpus linguistics, multilingualism, discourse analysis, and language education, aiming at promoting discussion among researchers in different fields. It features a "Forum" section, introduced in 2001, intended for short contributions, such as responses to articles and notices about current research.

== Abstracting and indexing ==
The journal is abstracted and indexed by:

- Linguistic Bibliography/Bibliographie Linguistique
- British Education Index
- Current Contents
- Education Research Abstracts
- Educational Management Abstracts
- International Bibliography of the Social Sciences
- Journal Citation Reports/Social Sciences Edition
- Linguistics & Language Behavior Abstracts
- Periodicals Index Online
- ProQuest
- PsychLIT
- Scopus
- Social Sciences Citation Index
- Studies on Women and Gender Abstracts
- The Standard Periodical Directory

== See also ==
- List of applied linguistics journals
