= American Association for Applied Linguistics =

American organization

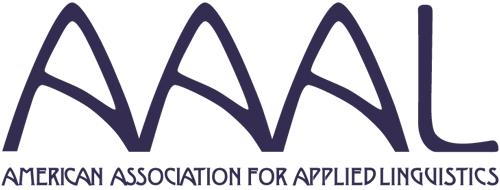
- Venue: Chicago, Illinois (2018); Atlanta, Georgia (2019)
- Country: United States, Canada
- Inaugurated: 1977
- Website: www.aaal.org

The American Association for Applied Linguistics (AAAL) is an American organization of scholars interested in applied linguistics.

The goal of the organization is to provide an annual venue for scholars of the multi-disciplinary field of applied linguistics to share their research. It promotes an evidence based and principled approach to language related research including language education, acquisition and loss, sociolinguistics, psycholinguistics, literacy, rhetoric, discourse analysis, language assessment, policy, planning, and more.

AAAL is an affiliate of the International Association of Applied Linguistics (Association Internationale de Linguistique Appliquée, AILA).

== Strands ==
Currently, AAAL has 19 strands. They are used during the submission process to help determine possible reviewers, and later for determining where and when given submissions might be presented during the conference. Those who wish to submit a proposal are required to choose from one of the strands below:

- Assessment and evaluation (ASE)
- Bilingual, immersion, heritage, and language minority education (BIH)
- Language cognition and brain research (COG)
- Corpus Linguistics (COR)
- Analysis of discourse and interaction (DIS)
- Educational Linguistics (EDU)
- Language, culture, socialization and pragmatics (LCS)
- Language and ideology (LID)
- Language maintenance and revitalization (LMR)
- Language, planning and policy (LPP/POL)
- Second and foreign language pedagogy (PED)
- Research methodology (REM)
- Reading, writing, and literacy (RWL)
- Second language acquisition, language acquisition, and attrition (SLA)
- Sociolinguistics (SOC)
- Language and technology (TEC)
- Translation and interpretation (TRI)
- Text analysis (written discourse) (TXT)
- Vocabulary and Lexical Studies (VOC)
