= Applied linguistics =

Study of language-related problems

Applied linguistics is an interdisciplinary field which identifies, investigates, and offers solutions to language-related real-life problems. Some of the academic fields related to applied linguistics are education, psychology, communication research, information science, natural language processing, anthropology, and sociology. Applied linguistics is a practical use of language.

== Domain ==
Applied linguistics is an interdisciplinary field. Major branches of applied linguistics include bilingualism and multilingualism, conversation analysis, contrastive linguistics, language assessment, literacies, discourse analysis, language pedagogy, second language acquisition, intercultural communication, language planning and policy, interlinguistics, stylistics, language teacher education, forensic linguistics, culinary linguistics, and translation.

== History ==
The tradition of applied linguistics established itself in part as a response to the narrowing of focus in linguistics with the advent in the late 1950s of generative linguistics, and has always maintained a socially-accountable role, demonstrated by its central interest in language problems.

Building on this orientation, applied linguistics grew through continued engagement with real-world language problems and with the descriptive study of language. Although not driven by linguistic theory, the field has drawn on fundamental understanding about language structure, bilingual attainment, and discourse processes to conduct informed and principled analysis. At the same time, work on authentic language use has fed back into linguistic theory, improving understandings of how language functions in diverse social and cognitive contexts.

As the field expanded, applied linguistics increasingly involved viewpoints, making use of research from psychology, sociology, anthropology, and cognitive science. This broadening enabled applied linguists to address issues ranging from language education and bilingual development to discourse practices, cultural meaning, and legal communication.

Although the field of applied linguistics started in Europe and the United States, the field rapidly flourished in the international context.

Applied linguistics first concerned itself with principles and practices on the basis of linguistics. In the early days, applied linguistics was thought as "linguistics-applied" at least from the outside of the field. In the 1960s, however, applied linguistics was expanded to include language assessment, language policy, and second language acquisition. As early as the 1970s, applied linguistics became a problem-driven field rather than theoretical linguistics, including the solution of language-related problems in the real world. By the 1990s, applied linguistics had broadened including critical studies and multilingualism. Research in applied linguistics was shifted to "the theoretical and empirical investigation of real-world problems in which language is a central issue."

In the United States, applied linguistics also began narrowly as the application of insights from structural linguistics—first to the teaching of English in schools and subsequently to second and foreign language teaching. The linguistics applied approach to language teaching was promulgated most strenuously by Leonard Bloomfield, who developed the foundation for the Army Specialized Training Program, and by Charles C. Fries, who established the English Language Institute (ELI) at the University of Michigan in 1941. In 1946, Applied linguistics became a recognized field of study at the aforementioned university. In 1948, the Research Club at Michigan established Language Learning: A Journal of Applied Linguistics, the first journal to bear the term applied linguistics. In the late 1960s, applied linguistics began to establish its own identity as an interdisciplinary field of linguistics concerned with real-world language issues. The new identity was solidified by the creation of the American Association for Applied Linguistics in 1977.

== Associations ==
The International Association of Applied Linguistics was founded in France in 1964, where it is better known as Association Internationale de Linguistique Appliquée or AILA. AILA has affiliates in more than thirty countries, some of which are listed below.

=== Australia ===
Australian applied linguistics took as its target the applied linguistics of mother tongue teaching and teaching English to immigrants. The Australian tradition shows a strong influence of continental Europe and of the US, rather than of Britain. Applied Linguistics Association of Australia (ALAA) was established at a national congress of applied linguists held in August 1976. ALAA holds a joint annual conference in collaboration with the Association for Applied Linguistics in New Zealand (ALANZ).

=== Canada ===
The Canadian Association of Applied Linguistics / L'Association Canadienne de Linguistique appliquée (CAAL/ACLA), is an officially bilingual (English and French) scholarly association with approximately 200 members. They produce the Canadian Journal of Applied Linguistics and hold an annual conference.

=== Ireland ===
The Irish Association for Applied Linguistics/Cumann na Teangeolaíochta Feidhmí (IRAAL) was founded in 1975. They produce the journal Teanga, the Irish word for 'language'.

=== Japan ===
In 1982, the Japan Association of Applied Linguistics (JAAL) was established in the Japan Association of College English Teachers (JACET) to engage in activities on a more international scale. In 1984, JAAL became an affiliate of the International Association of Applied Linguistics (AILA).

=== New Zealand ===
The Applied Linguistics Association of New Zealand (ALANZ) produces the journal New Zealand Studies in Applied Linguistics and has been collaborating with the Applied Linguistics Association of Australia in a combined annual conference since 2010, with the Association for Language Testing and Assessment of Australia and New Zealand (ALTAANZ) later joining the now three-way conference collaboration.

=== South Africa ===
The Southern African Applied Linguistics Association (SAALA) was founded in 1980. There are currently four publications associated with SAALA including the Southern African Linguistics and Applied Language Studies Journal (SAJALS).

=== United Kingdom ===
The British Association for Applied Linguistics (BAAL) was established in 1967. Its mission is "the advancement of education by fostering and promoting, by any lawful charitable means, the study of language use, language acquisition and language teaching and the fostering of interdisciplinary collaboration in this study [...]". BAAL hosts an annual conference, as well as many additional smaller conferences and events organised by its Special Interest Groups (SIGs).

=== United States ===
The American Association for Applied Linguistics (AAAL) was founded in 1977. AAAL holds an annual conference, usually in March or April, in the United States or Canada.

== Journals ==
Major journals of the field include Research Methods in Applied Linguistics, Annual Review of Applied Linguistics, Applied Linguistics, Studies in Second Language Acquisition, Applied Psycholinguistics, International Review of Applied Linguistics in Language Teaching, International Journal of Applied Linguistics, Applied Linguistics Review, European Journal of Applied Linguistics, Language Learning, Language and Education, System, TESOL Quarterly, International Journal of Language Studies, and Linguistics and Education.
