= Outline of second-language acquisition =

Overview of and topical guide to second-language acquisition

The following outline is provided as an overview of and topical guide to second-language acquisition:

Second-language acquisition – process by which people learn a second language. Second-language acquisition (often abbreviated to SLA) also refers to the scientific discipline devoted to studying that process. Second language refers to any language learned in addition to a person's first language, including the learning of third, fourth, and subsequent languages. It is also called second-language learning, foreign language acquisition, and L2 acquisition.

== What is second-language acquisition? ==
Second-language acquisition can be described as all of the following:

- Language acquisition – process by which humans acquire the capacity to perceive and comprehend language, as well as to produce and use words and sentences to communicate. Language acquisition is one of the quintessential human traits, because nonhumans do not communicate by using language.
- Academic discipline – branch of knowledge that is taught or researched at the college or university level. Also called a field of study. Disciplines are defined (in part) and recognized by the academic journals in which research is published, and the learned societies and academic departments or faculties to which their practitioners belong. A discipline incorporates relevant knowledge, expertise, skills, people, projects, communities, problems, challenges, studies, inquiry, approaches, and research areas.
- Branch of science – systematic enterprise that builds and organizes knowledge in the form of testable explanations and predictions about the universe. "Science" also refers to a body of knowledge itself, of the type that can be rationally explained and reliably applied.
  - Branch of social science – academic discipline concerned with the society and the relationships of individuals within a society, which primarily rely on empirical approaches.
    - Branch of linguistics – scientific study of human language.
      - Branch of applied linguistics – interdisciplinary field of study that identifies, investigates, and offers solutions to language-related real-life problems. Some of the academic fields related to applied linguistics are education, linguistics, psychology, computer science, anthropology, and sociology.
- A form of language education – teaching and learning of a foreign or second language. Language education is a branch of applied linguistics.

== Branches of second-language acquisition ==
- English as a second or foreign language – use or study of English by speakers with different native languages. It is also known as English for speakers of other languages (ESOL), English as an additional language (EAL), and English as a foreign language (EFL).
- Chinese as a foreign language – study of the varieties of Chinese by non-native speakers.
- Spanish as a second language – teaching and learning of Spanish for those whose mother tongue is not Spanish, particularly immigrants, tourists, indigenous peoples and refugees.
- Etc.

== Related fields ==
- Teaching English as a foreign language –

== Learning objectives: language skills ==
- Foreign-language vocabulary –
- Linguistic competence –
- Linguistic performance –
- Language fluency –
- Language proficiency –
- Multilingualism –
  - Bilingualism –

== Second-language acquisition resources ==
=== Second-language acquisition methods and activities ===
- Extensive listening – similar to extensive reading, it's the analogous approach to listening. One issue is that listening speed is generally slower than reading speed, so simpler texts are recommended.
- Extensive reading – large amount of reading, to increase unknown word encounters and associated learning opportunities by inferencing. The learner's view and review of unknown words in specific context will allow the learner to infer and thus learn those words' meanings.
- Intensive reading – slow, careful reading of a small amount of difficult text – it is when one is "focused on the language rather than the text".
- Language immersion – teaching and self-teaching method in which the second language is the medium of instruction, with no use of primary language allowed. All educational materials and all communication are in the second language.
- Paderborn method – learn a simple language first, such as Esperanto, and then the target second language. Saves time by making the second language easier to learn.
- Vocabulary acquisition –

=== Second-language acquisition tools ===
- Dictionary – collection of words in one or more specific languages, often listed alphabetically, with usage information, definitions, etymologies, phonetics, pronunciations, and other relevant information.
  - Mono-lingual dictionary – dictionary in a single language. A mono-lingual dictionary in the language being acquired assists the reader in describing words (and thinking about the language) in the language's own terms.
  - Bilingual dictionary – also called a translation dictionary, is a specialized dictionary used to translate words or phrases from one language to another.
    - Unidirectional bilingual dictionary – lists the meanings of words of one language in another
    - Bidirectional bilingual dictionary – presents translation to and from both included languages.
  - Talking dictionary – some online dictionaries and dictionary programs provide text-to-speech pronunciation.
  - Visual dictionary – dictionary that primarily uses pictures to illustrate the meaning of words. Each component within each picture is labeled with its name. Visual dictionaries can be monolingual or multilingual. Visual dictionaries in the language being acquired are especially useful in language immersion approaches.
- Media in the target language
  - Books
    - Audio books
  - Encyclopedias
    - Wikipedia (see language editions list)
  - Music
    - Lyrics (to read along) (see ColorSounds)
  - Videos
    - Movies
    - TV shows
  - Websites
- Subtitles –
  - Closed captioning –
- Word lists by frequency – lists of a language's words grouped by frequency of occurrence within some given text corpus, either by levels or as a ranked list, serving the purpose of vocabulary acquisition.

== History of second-language acquisition ==
History of second-language acquisition

== Second-language acquisition phenomena ==
- Second-language attrition – decline of second-language skills due to lack of use or practice of the second language and/or lack of exposure to it.
- Code-switching – switching between two or more languages, or language varieties, in the context of a single conversation.
- Communication strategies in second-language acquisition
- Interlanguage –
- Second-language phonology –
- Silent period – stage in second language acquisition where learners do not attempt to speak. Silent periods are more common in children than in adult learners, as there is often more pressure on adult learners to speak during the early stages of acquisition.

=== Factors affecting the learning of a second-language ===
- Individual variation in second-language acquisition –
- Foreign language anxiety
- Language-learning aptitude – aptitude measurement via tests, the results of which correlate with how well the test takers will succeed at picking up a new language. Language aptitude test include:
  - Modern Language Aptitude Test – mainly authored by John B. Carroll, for adults, mainly used by government and military institutions to select employees for language training
  - Defense Language Aptitude Battery – developed and used by the United States Department of Defense to select candidates for jobs that will require them to attain fluency in a foreign language
  - Pimsleur Language Aptitude Battery – authored by Paul Pimsleur, used to assess the language learning aptitude of students in grades 7 to 12
  - Modern Language Aptitude Test – Elementary – mainly authored by John B. Carroll, designed to test children in grades 3 to 6
  - Cognitive Ability for Novelty in Acquisition of Language - Foreign – developed by Grigorenko, Sternberg, and Ehrman in 2000, using a new concept of language aptitude as a theoretical base
- Motivation in second-language learning –
- Willingness to communicate – students willing to communicate in the second language learn how, those who are not willing, not so much.
- Metalinguistic awareness –

==== Hypothesized success factors ====
- Acculturation model – hypothesis in which effectiveness in acquiring a second language is due in part to how well the learner acclimatizes to the culture (and members) of the target language. Increases in the social and psychological distances the learner has from the members of the target culture leads to fewer opportunities to learn the language.
- Input hypothesis –
- Interaction hypothesis – the development of language proficiency is promoted by face-to-face interaction and communication.
- Comprehensible output hypothesis –
- Competition model – posits that the meaning of language is interpreted by comparing a number of linguistic cues within a sentence, and that language is learned through the competition of basic cognitive mechanisms in the presence of a rich linguistic environment.
- Noticing hypothesis – concept proposed by Richard Schmidt, which states that learners cannot learn the grammatical features of a language unless they notice them. That is, noticing is the essential starting point for acquisition. Whether the noticing can be subconscious is a matter of debate.

== Second-language acquisition research ==
- Good language learner studies
- Second-language acquisition classroom research

== Second-language acquisition-related organizations ==
- Eataw
- European Second Language Association
- National Association of Bilingual Education –
- National Clearinghouse for English Language Acquisition (NCELA) –
- Language camps – summer camps hosted by high schools, colleges, and universities; high schools, colleges, and universities around the United States have developed programs such as summer programs, to meet the growing demand for language education. Many of these summer programs are language camps.

== Second-language acquisition publications ==
- Applied Linguistics (journal)
- Journal of Second Language Writing
- Language Learning (journal)
- Language Teaching Research
- Second Language Research
- System
- TESOL Journal
- TESOL Quarterly

== Persons influential in second-language acquisition ==
- Alexander Arguelles –
- Ellen Bialystok –
- John Bissell Carroll –
- Kees de Bot - bilingualism
- H. Douglas Brown –
- Pit Corder –
- Marijn van Dijk - child language acquisition
- Nick Ellis –
- Rod Ellis –
- Susan M. Ervin-Tripp –
- Paul van Geert - developmental psychology
- Fred Genesee –
- David W. Green –
- François Grosjean –
- Luke Harding - Language testing
- Judit Kormos - Motivation in second language learning
- Stephen Krashen –
- Judith F. Kroll –
- Diane Larsen-Freeman - Complex Dynamic Systems Theory
- Ping Li –
- Michael Long –
- Wander Lowie - Complex Dynamic Systems Theory
- Brian MacWhinney – Competition model
- Viorica Marian –
- Paul Kei Matsuda – Second language writing
- Stephen Matthews (linguist) –
- Jurgen M. Meisel –
- Carol Myers-Scotton
- Paul Nation – Second language vocabulary
- Teresa Pica
- Paul Pimsleur -
- Wilga Rivers –
- Richard Schmidt –
- Norbert Schmitt - Second language vocabulary
- Carmen Silva-Corvalan –
- Dan Slobin –
- Merrill Swain –
- Tracy D. Terrell –
- Michael T. Ullman –
- Jyotsna Vaid
- Bill Van Patten –
- Marjolijn Verspoor - Complex Dynamic Systems Theory
- Lydia White –
- Virginia Yip –

== See also ==
- Outline of education
- Suggestopedia
