= Near-native speaker =

Speaker with close to native proficiency

In linguistics, the term native-level (near-native) speakers is used to describe speakers who have achieved "levels of proficiency that cannot be distinguished from native levels in everyday spoken communication and only become apparent through detailed linguistic analyses" (p. 484) in their second language or foreign languages. Analysis of native and native-level speakers indicates that they differ in their underlying grammar and intuition, meaning that they do not interpret grammatical contrasts the same way. However, this divergence typically does not impact a near-native speaker's regular usage of the language.

== Domains of proficiency ==
Although the vast majority of literature has shown that the age of acquisition of the learner is important in determining whether learners can attain nativelike proficiency, a small number of late learners have demonstrated accents and knowledge of certain areas of grammar that are as proficient as that of native speakers.

=== Phonetics and pronunciation ===
Late learners who learn a language after the critical period can acquire an accent that is similar to that of native speakers, provided that they have attained relatively high levels of proficiency. In one study that employed speech samples of language learners, advanced learners of Dutch who spoke different first languages were tasked to read Dutch sentences. In addition, native Dutch speakers who were matched for levels of education served as controls. The recordings of these sentences from both the advanced learners of Dutch and the Dutch native speakers were played to Dutch native speakers (some of whom were Dutch language teachers). They were then asked to rate each speaker on a five-point scale based on how "foreign" they perceive the accent to be. The authors reported that four out of 30 learners were perceived by the native speakers to have achieved nativelike pronunciation. Similarly, the pronunciation of five out of 11 Dutch university students of English language and literature were perceived to be as good as native speakers of English even though they did not receive formal instruction in English before the age of 12.

Second language learners’ pronunciation measured by voice onset time production has also been shown to be close to that of native speakers. Four out of 10 Spanish speakers who started learning Swedish as a second language at or after the age of 12 years exhibited voice onset time measurements that were similar to that of native speakers when asked to read out Swedish words with the voiceless stops /p/, /t/ and /k/. Likewise, a small number of late Spanish learners of Swedish were also able to perceive voiced and voiceless stops in Swedish as well as native speakers.

=== Morphology and syntax ===
In the domain of morphology and syntax ('morphosyntax'), second language learners’ proficiency is typically tested using the Grammaticality Judgment Test. Participants in such studies have to decide whether the sentence presented is grammatical or ungrammatical. Similar to in the domain of phonology and phonetics, highly proficient second language learners have also shown near-native proficiency despite the fact that the target language was acquired at a later age. English, Dutch and Russian learners who exhibited near-native proficiencies in German were shown to perform as well as German native speakers in Grammaticality Judgment Tests that focused on word order and case markings. This was also consistent with an earlier study on learners of English as a second language who started learning English after puberty. These highly proficient learners displayed accuracy rates and reactions times similar to that of native speakers of English when asked to judge grammatical and ungrammatical wh- questions in the Grammaticality Judgment Test.

== Common proficiency tests ==
=== Grammaticality Judgement Test ===
The Grammaticality Judgment Test (GJT) is one of the many ways to measure language proficiency and knowledge of grammar cross-linguistically. It was first introduced to second language research by Jacqueline S. Johnson and Elissa L. Newport. Participants are tested on various grammatical structures in the second language. The test involves showing participants sentences that may or may not contain grammatical mistakes, and they have to decide on the absence or presence of grammatical issues. The test assumes that one's language proficiency is derived from language competence and language performance and reflects what sentence structures learners think are plausible or not in the language.

However, in recent years, there have been papers that questioned the reliability of GJT. Some papers have argued that most sentences in GJT have been taken out of context. The lack of standardisation when administering the GJT in studies have also been deemed to be controversial, with the most prominent one being participants in untimed GJT performing better than those under timed GJT.

=== White noise test ===
The white noise test was first developed by Spolsky, Sigurd, Sato, Walker & Arterburn in 1968. In these tests, recordings of speech with varying levels of white noise are played to participants and they are then asked to repeat what they have heard. Participants will need to rely more on their own knowledge of the language to understand the speech signal when there is a higher level of white noise in the speech signal. In addition, the ability of the second language speakers to decode what was being said in various conditions usually will determine their proficiency in the second language.

=== Cloze test ===
Participants of cloze tests are typically given texts with blanks and are tasked to complete the blanks with appropriate words. To identify the correct item that fits the missing portion, cloze tests require second language speakers to understand the context, vocabulary, grammatical and pragmatic knowledge of the second language.

=== Voice onset time ===
The voice onset time (VOT) helps to measure the second language speaker’s proficiency by analysing the participants’ ability to detect distinctions between similar-sounding phonemes. VOT refers to "the time interval between the onset of the release burst of a stop consonant and the onset of periodicity from vocal fold vibration" (p. 75). In studies that employed this method, participants were either required to read aloud words containing the phonemes of interest or determine if the minimal pairs that they heard was voiced or voiceless. The performance of late learners can then compared to that of native speakers to determine if the late learners exhibit near-native speaker proficiencies.

=== Ratings of accent by native speakers ===
In reading or production tasks, learners of the language are tasked to read aloud sentences or texts containing phonemes of the target language that may be more difficult for learners to pronounce. Some studies also elicited speech samples from participants by encouraging them to talk about anything they would like with regards to a specific topic. Native speakers of the language also serve as controls. These recordings from both the learners and native speakers are then rated by another group of native speakers of the language using scales based on how much foreign accent they perceive. Learners are determined to have sounded like natives if they have ratings that are within two standard deviations of the native controls.

== Factors that lead to near-native speakers ==
=== Motivation ===
Motivation acts as a tool for near-native speakers in attaining near-native proficiency. Late learners of a second language who show nativelike proficiencies are typically motivated to sound like natives and to attain high levels of proficiency for professional reasons. Near-native speakers also tend to embark on careers that are related to the second language, such as translators or language teachers.

=== Training ===
To sound like natives, non-native learners can take up suprasegmental and segmental training. In a study on graduate students of the German language who only had exposure and formal instruction in the German language after the age of eleven, those who had suprasegmental and segmental training were more likely to be rated to be close to native speakers of German for recordings of their speech samples. Similarly, near-native Dutch learners of English were reported to also have received training on the phonemes of English. These studies highlight the importance of suprasegmental and segmental training in language pedagogy, especially for late learners of a target language who are motivated to sound like native speakers.

=== Typological similarity between the first language and target language(s) ===
The extent to which late learners can achieve near-native speaker status could also depend on the typological distance between the learner’s first language and target language(s). In an examination of Dutch late learners of different first languages, the late learners that exhibited nativelike accents were speakers of German and English which are also Germanic languages like Dutch. Hence, similarities between the learner’s first language and target language(s) may facilitate acquisition of the target language(s).

=== Necessity of the second language in daily lives ===
The necessity of using their second language(s) in their daily lives, be it for professional or personal progression, has also shown to help hone near-native speakers' second language proficiency. A study on 43 very advanced late learners of Dutch revealed that those who were employed in language-related jobs exhibited nativelike proficiencies. Therefore, the need to use the second language for work purposes aids in attaining native-like proficiencies. Furthermore, late learners who have performed as well as native speakers in language tasks have typically married native speakers of the target language, hence showing that daily usage of the language is one of the factors that lead to high levels of proficiency. By having an environment that requires the continual training and usage of the second language, near-native speakers' proficiency in the second language is expected to improve because professional lives provide linguistic opportunities for conscious and explicit reflection on the second language's linguistic structure, hence helping near-native speakers to become more proficient in their second language.

=== Aptitude ===
Language-learning aptitude refers to a “largely innate, relatively fixed talent for learning languages" (p. 485). A comparison of highly proficient late learners and early learners of Swedish concluded that the late learners generally performed better than early learners on a language aptitude test (as measured by the Swansea Language Aptitude Test). Thus, an aptitude for learning languages may help late learners in achieving near-native proficiencies.

==== Contention against Aptitude ====
Arguments against aptitude as a factor for near-native speakers' proficiency exist in the linguistic field. Prominent academics like Bialystok(1997) argued that coincidental circumstances (social, educational, etc) allow near-native speakers to be proficient in second language(s) and aptitude does not account for their proficiency since they are not "rare individuals with an unusual and prodigious talent" performing "extraordinary feats" (p. 134).

==== Language Aptitude Test ====
Carroll(1981) identifies four important constituents of language aptitude: phonetic coding ability, grammatical sensitivity, rote learning ability and inductive learning ability.

===== Examples of Language Aptitude Tests =====
- Modern Language Aptitude Test (MLAT)
- Pimsleur Language Aptitude Battery (PLAB)
- Defense Language Aptitude Battery (DLAB)
- VORD
- CANAL-F
- Swansea Language Aptitude Test
- Llama Language Aptitude Tests

== Examples of near-native speakers ==
=== Non-native language teachers ===
An example of near-native speakers are non-native language teachers. Since non-native English-speaking teachers (NNESTs) need to teach their second language in their daily lives to be competent language teachers, they have to continuously train their linguistic ability and capacity in the second language. Hence, teaching it daily helps to increase their likelihood of being near-native.

As English-language proficiency tests are usually recognised as the 'make-or-break' requirement in ESL, it becomes a professional duty for NNESTs to improve their English linguistic capacity. The continual training of the second language thus helps to train their linguistic ability and capacity to become near-native speakers.

One study on the difference in teaching behaviour between native English-speaking teachers (NESTs) and NNESTs found that NNESTs' attitude towards teaching English is significantly different from that of NESTs. NNESTs’ own experience from learning the language increases their perceptiveness to better pick up on probable difficulties students might have during the language learning process. This is because NNESTs typically share the same learning foundation as their students when learning the second language and over time, they can better analyse and predict probable linguistic errors students might make. These NNESTs end up becoming labelled as "more insightful" (p. 435) and having "sixth sense" (p. 438) when teaching English.

Moreover, research on hiring NESTs and NNESTs found that recruiters who hired non-native speakers had positive experiences and that students of NNESTs are not dissatisfied with non-native teachers of the language. Hence, through the constant need to use their second language in their professional lives, NNESTs can be said to have attained near-native speaker status and are also effective language teachers like NESTs.

== Bibliography ==
- Montrul, Silvina; Slabakova, Roumyana (2003). "Competence Similarities Between Native and Near-native Speakers: An Investigation of the Preterite-imperfect Contrast in Spanish". Studies in Second Language Acquisition. 25 (3): 351–398. doi:10.1017/S0272263103000159. S2CID 13226483.
- White, Lydia; Genesee, Fred (1996). "How native is near-native? The issue of ultimate attainment in adult second language acquisition". Second Language Research. 12 (3): 233–265. doi:10.1177/026765839601200301. S2CID 146433640.
- Coppieters, René (September 1987). "Competence Differences between Native and Near-Native Speakers". Language. 63 (3): 544–573. doi:10.2307/415005. JSTOR 415005.
- "Who Is a Native Speaker of American English?". American National Corpus. "In contrast, a near-native speaker usually acquires language skills after childhood, and relies less on family and social immersion to learn the fundamentals."
