= Pimsleur =

Pimsleur may refer to:

- Paul Pimsleur, an applied linguistics researcher
- Pimsleur Language Programs, a language learning company
- Pimsleur Language Aptitude Battery, a test for predicting success in foreign language acquisition
