= Individual variation in second-language acquisition =

Differences in language-learning success

Individual variation in second-language acquisition is the study of why some people learn a second language better than others. Unlike children who acquire a language, adults learning a second language rarely reach the same level of competence as native speakers of that language. Some may stop studying a language before they have fully internalized it, and others may stop improving despite living in a foreign country for many years. It also appears that children are more likely than adults to reach native-like competence in a second language. There have been many studies that have attempted to explain these phenomena.

A flurry of studies in the 1970s, often labelled the "good language learner studies", sought to identify the distinctive factors characteristic of successful learners. Although those studies are now widely regarded as simplistic, they did serve to identify a number of factors affecting language acquisition. More detailed research on many of these specific factors continues today. For this reason, individual variation in second-language acquisition is not generally considered a single area of research. Rather, it is simply a convenient way to categorize studies about language aptitude, age and language learning, strategy use, and affective factors that affect language acquisition.

== Language aptitude ==
There are two definitions that help explain individual difference variables. The first is predictive. Language aptitude is related to a set of cognitive abilities. These cognitive abilities allow one to predict how well an individual can learn a foreign language. These abilities change under limited time and circumstances. The second definition is interactional. It views language aptitude as comprehension abilities during second language learning. Aptitude is or can be subject to change according to an environment. It highlights that no specific instruction works for all second language learners. Therefore, in order for an individual to grasp a second language, there must be an adaption. Where the learner’s abilities can flourish under different learning conditions.

A meta-analysis brought to light that the importance of aptitude is an overestimate when it comes to grammatical capability. In specific conditions, language aptitude is a conscious construct which affects learning results. Language aptitude can be useful in predicting the beginning stages of second language learning, when it comes to grammatical competence, but it is not a reliable way to learning stages.

Tests of language aptitude have proven extremely effective in predicting which learners will be successful in learning. However, considerable controversy remains about whether language aptitude is properly regarded as a unitary concept, an organic property of the brain, or as a complex of factors including motivation and short-term memory. Research has generally shown that language aptitude is quite distinct from general aptitude or intelligence, as measured by various tests, and is itself fairly consistently measurable by different tests.

Language aptitude research is often criticized for being irrelevant to the problems of language learners, who must attempt to learn a language regardless of whether they are gifted for the task or not. This claim is reinforced by research findings that aptitude is largely unchangeable. In addition, traditional language aptitude measures such as the Modern Language Aptitude Test strongly favor decontextualized knowledge of the sort used in taking tests, rather than the sort used in conversation. For this reason little research is carried out on aptitude today. However, operators of selective language programs such as the United States Defense Language Institute continue to use language aptitude testing as part of applicant screening.

== Age ==
How children acquire native language (L1) and the relevance of this to foreign language (L2) learning has long been debated. Although evidence for L2 learning ability declining with age is controversial, a common notion is that children learn L2s easily and older learners rarely achieve fluency. This assumption stems from ‘critical period’ (CP) ideas. A CP was popularised by Eric Lenneberg in 1967 for L1 acquisition, but considerable interest now surrounds age effects on second-language acquisition (SLA). SLA theories explain learning processes and suggest causal factors for a possible CP for SLA, mainly attempting to explain apparent differences in language aptitudes of children and adults by distinct learning routes, and clarifying them through psychological mechanisms. Research explores these ideas and hypotheses, but results are varied: some demonstrate pre-pubescent children acquire language easily, and some that older learners have the advantage, and yet others focus on existence of a CP for SLA. Recent studies have recognised that certain aspects of SLA may be affected by age, though others remain intact.

In terms of specific ages, Steven Pinker and colleagues conducted a large-scale internet study aimed at measuring individual’s age, English proficiency, and amount of time spent practicing English. The findings suggest that the ability to learn a new language with fluency declines after age 18 and must begin by age 10. There are three main factors why our ability to acquire a new language declines after the age of 18. First, significant social changes usually occur at the age of 18. For example, during this period of time individuals may be heading off to college or entering the workforce. As a result, less time is dedicated towards learning a new language. Secondly, an individual’s primary language may impede the development of a newer language. The grammatical rules of our first language become more readily available in our minds as we are exposed to our first language in larger quantities. Lastly, our brains are still developing. In this case, learning becomes more difficult because the brain is undergoing significant changes during our late teenage years and early-20s.

== Strategy use ==
The effective use of strategies has been shown to be critical to successful language learning, so much so that Canale and Swain (1980) included "strategic competence" among the four components of communicative competence. Research here has also shown significant pedagogical effects. This has given rise to "strategies-based instruction."

Strategies are commonly divided into learning strategies and communicative strategies, although there are other ways of categorizing them. Learning strategies are techniques used to improve learning, such as mnemonics or using a dictionary. Learners (and native speakers) use communicative strategies to get meaning across even when they lack access to the correct language: for example, by using pro-forms like "thing", or non-spoken means such as mime. Communicative strategies may not have any direct bearing on learning, and some strategies such as avoidance (not using a form with which one is uncomfortable) may actually hinder learning.

Children use their own strategies of cross reference to learn second languages. A longitudinal study investigated preschool children in an environment where they were exposed to English as a second language. What was noted was that the children applied the knowledge from their first language, using patterns to develop their phonology. It was seen that mere immersion and rehearsal was an effective way for the children to increase their proficiency of their second language.

Learners from different cultures use strategies in different ways, as a research tradition led by Rebecca Oxford has demonstrated. Related to this are differences in strategy use between male and female learners. Numerous studies have shown that female learners typically use strategies more widely and intensively than males; this may be related to the statistical advantage which female learners enjoy in language learning.

Different learning strategies have been evaluated and tested to determine the efficacy of their methods.

A strategy that was found effective with English speaking Chinese learners was the use of a virtual environment. A virtual environment consists of a digital world in which a person may experience whatever is programmed. A virtual environment was created using the online virtual world known as Second Life, where the users could interact with objects, learning the words and sounds simultaneously. This learning strategy was found to be significantly more effective than traditional methods of displaying solely an image and sound. A similar study was done immersing Chinese learners in a virtual environment and found visualization of the objects increased the learning proficiency and scores on the proficiency test. The results of the two studies suggest an advantage when using a virtual environment juxtaposed to traditional methods among Chinese learners.

== Affective factors ==
Affective factors relate to the learner's emotional state and attitude toward the target language. Research on affect in language learning is still strongly influenced by Bloom's taxonomy, which describes the affective levels of receiving, responding, valuing, organization, and self-characterization through one's value system. It has also been informed in recent years by research in neurobiology and neurolinguistics. A research study conducted by Ni (2012), was interested in the role that affective factors played in second-language acquisition (SLA). Additionally, she wanted to know how to apply this knowledge to the context of an educational setting. For example, many instructors want to create lessons for students that facilitate the process of learning a new foreign language. The study Ni (2012) conducted sought to find what important skills students could implement in their SLA pursuits. A 10-item questionnaire was administered to 50 students enrolled in the Foreign Language Department at Heze University in China. The questions collected data on participants’ English fluency, affective factors influence in their SLA, and the preferred method of feedback from their instructor. The main findings displayed how affective factors (e.g. motivation, self-confidence, and anxiety) may advance the acquisition of English as a second language. By using this knowledge, teachers can strengthen their students’ emotional states and create a more welcoming class environment. In doing so, students may be able to acquire a second language more effectively.

=== Affective filter ===
Furthermore, researchers believe that language learners all possess an affective filter which affects language acquisition. If a student possesses a high filter they are less likely to engage in language learning because of shyness, concern for grammar or other factors. Students possessing a lower affective filter will be more likely to engage in learning because they are less likely to be impeded by other factors. The affective filter is an important component of second-language learning.

=== Anxiety ===
Although some continue to propose that a low level of anxiety may be helpful, studies have almost unanimously shown that anxiety damages students' prospects for successful learning. Anxiety is often related to a sense of threat to the learner's self-concept in the learning situation, for example if a learner fears being ridiculed for a mistake.

=== Personality factors ===
Second-language acquisition is defined as the learning and adopting of a language that is not the learner's native language. Studies have shown that extroverts acquire a second language better than introverts.

One particular study done by Naiman reflected this point. The subjects were 72 Canadian high school students from grades 8, 10 and 12 who were studying French as a second language.

Naiman gave them all questionnaires to establish their psychological profiles, which also included a French listening test and imitation test. He found that approximately 70% of the students with the higher grades (B or higher) would consider themselves extroverts.

Extroverts will be willing to try to communicate even if they are not sure they will succeed. Two scientists, Kinginger and Farrell, conducted interviews with U.S. students after their study abroad program in France in 2003. They found that many of the students would avoid interaction with the native speakers at all costs, while others jumped at the opportunity to speak the language. Those who avoided interaction were typically quiet, reserved people (i.e., introverts).

Logically, anxiety will cause students not to try and advance their skills, especially when they feel they are under pressure. Just the lack of practice will make introverts less likely to fully acquire the second language.

=== Social effects ===
The process of language learning can be very stressful, and the impact of positive or negative attitudes from the surrounding society can be critical. One aspect that has received particular attention is the relationship of gender roles to language achievement. Studies across numerous cultures have shown that women, on the whole, enjoy an advantage over men. Some have proposed that this is linked to gender roles. Doman notes in a journal devoted to issues of Cultural effects on SLA, "Questions abound about what defines SLA, how far its borders extend, and what the attributions and contributions of its research are. Thus, there is a great amount of heterogeneity in the entire conceptualization of SLA. Some researchers tend to ignore certain aspects of the field, while others scrutinize those same aspects piece by piece."

Community attitudes toward the language being learned can also have a profound impact on Second Language Acquisition. Where the community has a broadly negative view of the target language and its speakers, or a negative view of its relation to them, learning is typically much more difficult. This finding has been confirmed by research in numerous contexts. A widely cited example is the difficulty faced by Navajo children in learning English as a second language.

Other common social factors include the attitude of parents toward language study, and the nature of group dynamics in the language classroom. Additionally, early attitudes may strengthen motivation and facility with language in general, particularly with early exposure to the language. All these sum up to affect learners' acquisition of the target language and learners' language/ code choice when multiple varieties of a (second) language are involved.

=== Motivation ===
The role of motivation in SLA has been the subject of extensive scholarship, closely influenced by work in motivational psychology. Motivation is internally complex, and Dörnyei begins his work by stating that "strictly speaking, there is no such thing as motivation." There are many different kinds of motivation; these are often divided into types such as integrative or instrumental, intrinsic or extrinsic. Intrinsic motivation refers to the desire to do something for an internal reward. Most studies have shown it to be substantially more effective in long-term language learning than extrinsic motivation, for an external reward such as high grades or praise. Integrative and instrumental orientations refer to the degree that a language is learned "for its own sake" (integratively) or for instrumental purposes. Studies have not consistently shown either form of motivation to be more effective than the other, and the role of each is probably conditioned by various personality and cultural factors.

Some research has shown that motivation correlates strongly with proficiency, indicating both that successful learners are motivated and that success improves motivation. Thus motivation is not fixed, but is strongly affected by feedback from the environment. Accordingly, the study of motivation in SLA has also examined many of the external factors discussed above, such as the effect of instructional techniques on motivation. An accessible summary of this research can be found in Dörnyei (2001).

In their research on willingness to communicate, MacIntyre et al. have shown that motivation is not the final construct before learners engage in communication. In fact, learners may be highly motivated yet remain unwilling to communicate.

The European Union Lifelong learning programme has funded a project to research and build a set of best practices to motivate adult language learners, called Don't Give Up.
