= DLAB =

DLAB may refer to:

- Defense Language Aptitude Battery, a test used by the United States Department of Defense to test an individual's potential for learning a foreign language
- DLab, Italian video game school
