= Julia Pimsleur =

American author and entrepreneur

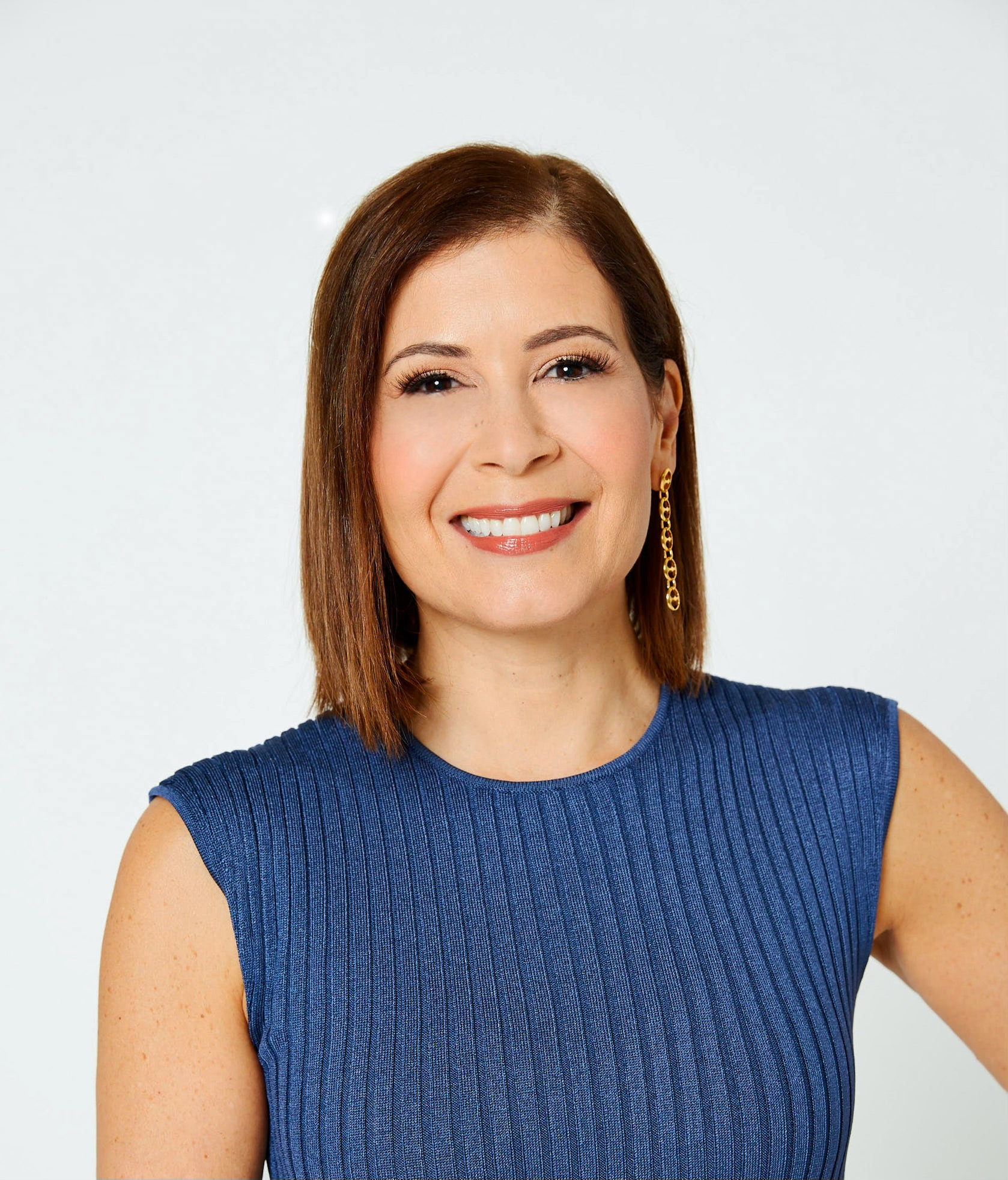
- Education: B.A., M.F.A.

Julia Pimsleur is an American entrepreneur and documentary filmmaker. She is the daughter of Paul Pimsleur, who was a scholar of applied linguistics.

== Early life and education ==
Pimsleur is the daughter of Paul Pimsleur, the creator of the Pimsleur Language Aptitude Battery and the Pimsleur Method, and author Beverly Pimsleur. She has an undergraduate degree from Yale. She has a Master of Fine Arts degree from the French National Film School in Paris and attended Harvard Business School’s Executive Education Program.

== Career ==
Pimsleur is the founder and CEO of Million Dollar Women, an organization that supports female entrepreneurship. She produced several films in association with the Arts Engine film organization, including Brother Born Again about her brother. Her films Nuyorican Dream and Innocent Until Proven Guilty were shown on Cinemax Reellife and HBO and at festivals around the world including the Sundance Film Festival. Pimsleur's film Boola Boola... Yale Goes Coed was awarded the Sudler Award for the Arts at Yale University.

== Personal life ==
In 2003 Pimsleur married Darren Stuart Levine, a rabbi. Pimsleur speaks French, Italian, some Spanish and lives in New York City with her two sons.
