= Bilingual (disambiguation) =

Bilingual means using two languages.

Bilingual may also refer to:

- Bilingual (album), a Pet Shop Boys album
- "Bilingual", a song by Ivy Queen and Remy Ma from the album There's Something About Remy: Based on a True Story
- Bilingual Review, a scholarly and literary journal of Hispanic-American bilingualism and literature
- Bilingual Press, a publishing house affiliated with the Hispanic Research Center at Arizona State University
- Bilingual inscription, in epigraphy an inscription that is extant in two languages

== See also ==
- Bilingualism (disambiguation)
- Bilingualism: Language and Cognition, an academic journal
- Official bilingualism in Canada, the policy of Canada's federal government giving English and French privileged legal status
- Bilingualism in Ottawa, the policy of the City of Ottawa, giving privileged status to English and French
- Trilingual heresy
