= MLAT =

MLAT may refer to:

- Magnetic latitude (MLAT), or geomagnetic latitude
- Mutual legal assistance treaty
- Modern Language Aptitude Test
- Multilateration
