= Charles August Steuber Heinle =

Entrepreneur and publishing executive

Charles A.S. Heinle
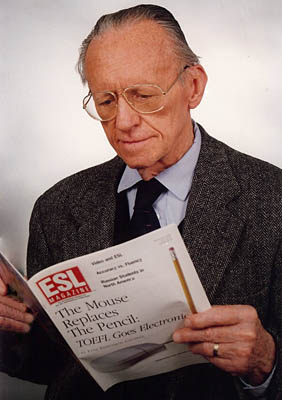
- Charles A.S. Heinle (1916–2012)
- Born: Charles August Steuber Heinle; December 25, 1916; Philadelphia, Pennsylvania, U.S.
- Died: July 23, 2012 (aged 95); Concord, Massachusetts, U.S.
- Occupations: Publishing executive, entrepreneur
- Known for: Marketing and expansion of the Pimsleur Language Programs
- Spouses: Ruth Leight (m. 1938; div.); Beverly D. Hoffman (m. 1973)
- Children: 6

Charles August Steuber Heinle (December 25, 1916 – July 23, 2012) was an American publishing executive and entrepreneur best known for his role in marketing and expanding the Pimsleur Language Programs, a self-study audio method for language learning.

== Early life and education ==
Heinle was born in Philadelphia, Pennsylvania, to Charles J. Heinle, a pharmaceutical chemist and inventor, and Elisabeth (Steuber) Heinle, a nurse. He was the eldest of four siblings and grew up in the Crescentville section of Philadelphia. He displayed musical talent from a young age, playing piano, clarinet and organ, and receiving vocal training. He studied English at Temple University.

== Military service ==
During World War II, Heinle enlisted in the United States Army Air Forces and served in Fukuoka, Japan, where he established and operated Armed Forces Radio Station WLKI.

== Publishing career ==
Following the war, Heinle worked in the publishing industry, including positions at J. B. Lippincott & Co. (1947–1954) and the Chilton Book Company, where he helped create the company's Trade Department. In 1962, he founded the Center for Curriculum Development in Philadelphia.

In the 1960s, Heinle and his wife, Beverly, founded Heinle & Heinle Enterprises in Concord, Massachusetts. The company produced and distributed language-learning materials, most notably the Pimsleur Language Programs, which Heinle acquired and marketed after meeting linguist Paul Pimsleur in 1966. Under Heinle's leadership, the enterprise expanded its catalog for schools, libraries, and adult learners, eventually becoming a significant independent publisher of educational and language-teaching materials.

During the 1970s and 1980s, Heinle & Heinle expanded into academic publishing under the imprint Heinle & Heinle Publishers based in Boston. The company's success in foreign-language and linguistics textbooks led to its acquisition by Thomson Corporation as part of its education division, Thomson Learning, forming the basis of the brand known as Thomson Heinle. Thomson integrated Heinle's catalog into its global portfolio of English-language-teaching (ELT) and linguistics materials, distributed internationally under the Thomson Learning name.

In 2007, The Thomson Corporation divested its education division, which was renamed Cengage Learning. The Heinle imprint continued as Cengage Heinle, which remains Cengage's ELT brand, publishing textbooks, readers, and digital tools such as Heinle eTools.

While the textbook division became part of Cengage, Heinle retained ownership of the Pimsleur courses until 1997, when they were sold to Simon & Schuster and integrated into its Pimsleur Language Programs brand.

=== Partnership with Paul Pimsleur ===
Heinle's most notable professional contribution came from his partnership with linguist Paul Pimsleur. In 1974, Pimsleur entrusted his audio-visual language materials to Heinle and his wife, Beverly D. Heinle, for marketing and distribution through the Center for Curriculum Development. The Heinles relocated to Concord, Massachusetts, where they established Heinle & Heinle Enterprises and expanded the Pimsleur catalog for schools, libraries, and adult learners.

In the 1980s, Heinle marketed the courses through a leased department at the Harvard Coop, described as the “Cassette Learning Centers.”

Their efforts brought the audio-first learning method to a mass audience and laid the groundwork for its later acquisition by Simon & Schuster in 1997.

== Personal life ==
Heinle married Ruth Leight in 1938; the couple had four children: Dolores L. Beatty, Charles H. Heinle, John D. Heinle, and Raymond J. Heinle. On December 25, 1973, he married Beverly D. (Hoffman-Voigt) Heinle, with whom he had two children, Elisabeth Beryl Weir and Katherine Margaretta Perry. In Concord he was active in community life, serving as president of the Friends of the Concord Public Library and publishing a revised 1978 edition of Historic Concord: A Handbook of Its Story and Its Memorial with an Account of the Lexington Fight. He was known locally for walking his French Briard sheepdog through town.

== Death and legacy ==
Heinle died on July 23, 2012, at the Concord Health Care Center in Concord, Massachusetts, aged 95. He is remembered for helping commercialize and expand the Pimsleur language-learning programs, bridging academic research and mainstream educational publishing.

== See also ==
- Pimsleur Language Programs
- Language education in the United States
- Educational publishing
