= Carmen Silva-Corvalan =

Linguistics professor

Carmen Silva-Corvalán is a Professor Emerita of Spanish and Portuguese Linguistics at the University of Southern California, where she taught since she obtained her doctoral degree at the University of California, Los Angeles in 1979. Silva-Corvalán has published extensively on bilingualism and language contact, and on the semantic and discourse-pragmatic constraints which condition syntactic variation. Silva-Corvalan was one of the four chief editors of Bilingualism: Language and Cognition, Cambridge University Press.

== Research ==
=== Bilingual language acquisition: Spanish and English in the first six years ===
In her 2014 book, Carmen Silva-Corvalán describes how she studied the development of bilingual language acquisition. Throughout this book she presents her findings of a longitudinal study she ran focusing on two developing English-Spanish bilinguals. Silva-Corvalán studied how these children can simultaneously learn two languages at the same time (Ruiz-Sanchez, 2015). The purpose of this study is to investigate the how much exposure and use of the two languages is needed in order to achieve proficiency in the language and its grammar. The two bilinguals that were studied are brothers from Los Angeles who she follows across several transitional periods for six years. Her main findings of this study were how many different factors play a part in providing explanations for language acquisition. These factors include the child's proficiency in the language and their amount exposure to the language. Silva-Corvalán's study has deepened our understanding of early bilingual language acquisition and Spanish language acquisition in general (Ruiz-Sanchez, 2015).

=== Extension of "estar" ===
Silva-Corvalán was interested in learning more about the changing and death of language. When two languages are introduced to one another, a primary and a secondary, the primary language typically has more influence over the secondary language. Silva-Corvalán explored the use of the verb estar in bilingual Spanish speakers to better understand this phenomenon. She wanted to discover how estar has changed in bilingual usage, why estar was so adaptable for the wide application, and how bilingual contact affected this change. Silva-Corvalán discovered that estar had a decrease in meaning over time, and began to be used in a greater range of contexts. The distinction between ser and estar had lessened. There is a universal tendency of semantic bleaching, which is the loss of meaning or emphasis of a word over time, that is present in estar. This semantic bleaching is a result of the variety of Spanish speakers interacting with the English-speaking population in Los Angeles. This linguistic contact was the catalyst for a change from within Spanish. Overall, Silva-Corvalán found that direct English influences on this simplification were difficult to spot; these finding are similar to Nancy C. Dorian and her studies on the East Sutherland Gaelic (ESG) language in 1978.

=== Spanish by third-generation children ===
Carmen Silva-Corvalán has mainly focused her career on bilingualism. In a 2014 study Carmen examined the changes that Spanish goes through in 3 generations with an emphasis on grammatical aspects of Bilingual First Language Acquisition. The first generation were foreign born who moved to the United States around age 8 and Spanish was their first language. The second and third generation were born in the United States. Silva-Corvalán found that throughout the three generations there was a preference of using English instead of Spanish when communicating with family and friends. Silva-Corvalan's study also provided evidence that children living in the home with grandparents can help with learning Spanish. The presence of Spanish monolingual grandparents in the daily lives of younger generations creates a necessity for the development of the second language. Silva-Corvalán found that there are several factors that play a role in the acquisition of language. These factors include amount of exposure to the language, attitudes toward the language, age at which the children are exposed to the language, and the presence of other languages in their home or community. Her study supports that older bilingual siblings receive more input from the parents and therefore reach a higher level of proficiency in both languages. Carmen Silva-Corvalán found in her study that the most critical factor that helped the children acquire both languages was positive family attitude. The parents encouraged the children to learn both languages, regularly conversed with them in both languages, and pointed out grammatical errors. In her study she found that third generation bilingual children do not show any differences in the development of language when compared to monolingual children. Monolingual and bilingual children go through the same stages of languages from babbling, to first words, combination of words, formation of sentences, and conversations. Silva-Corvalán's study also found that code-switching also depends on the input of the adults. If the adults code-switch when having a conversation or do not stop the child's alternation between languages, then as the child's communication develops their code-switching will continue.

=== Limits of convergence in language ===
Carmen Silva-Corvalán writes about the contact situation with English and Spanish languages, and how it led to the formation of Spanglish. Contact situation is the persevering of a minority language while switching to English .Contact situation has been found to be present in many groups of Spanish speaking immigrants in the United States. Contact situation brings about societal bilingualism, which occurs when one has not fully grasped their native language, and comes into contact with a new language. Due to many Spanish speaking immigrants, this has created a cross language called Spanglish. Spanglish is the mixture of both Spanish and English. Carmen Silva-Corvalán tries to prove that societal bilingualism is not dependent on syntax, but dependent on lexicon and pragmatics. The source language transfers through both lexical units and situational acts, and in doing this the syntax of the recipient language does not change, while the recipient language only changes at a societal level; because of this, when individuals find themselves needing to communicate and think quickly, Spanglish is used.

== Selected publications ==
- Silva-Corvalán, Carmen (1994) Language Contact and Change: Spanish in Los Angeles, Oxford University Press
- Silva-Corvalán, Carmen (2001) "Sociolingüística y Pragmática del Español", Georgetown University Press.
- Silva-Corvalán, Carmen (2014) "Bilingual Language Acquisition. Spanish and English in the First Six Years", Cambridge University Press.
