= Carol Griffiths =

New Zealand researcher in second language acquisition and related fields

- Occupations: Teacher, author and academic

Academic background
- Education: B.A., English language & literature and French; Diploma in Teaching; Diploma in English Language Teaching; M.A., Applied Linguistics; Ph.D., Education/Applied Linguistics
- Website: carol-lorac.com

Carol Griffiths is a teacher, author, and academic. She has conducted research on language learning strategies, individual differences in language acquisition, teacher education and support, action research, using literature in language teaching and learning, and the global use of English, including English as a lingua franca (ELF) and as a medium of instruction (EMI).

== Education and career ==
Griffiths studied English, French and literature at Massey University, graduating in 1963, and later trained as a teacher at Auckland Teachers College. She earned her master's degree in Applied Linguistics at the University of Waikato in 1996 and a doctorate in Education and Applied Linguistics at the University of Auckland in 2003.

Griffiths spent much of her early career in English language teaching in Auckland. She later moved into university teaching in Turkey, holding posts at Yeditepe University and Fatih University, and at the University of Leeds. In 2019, she joined Girne American University as an associate professor, and later became professor.

== Research ==
Griffiths has conducted research on applied linguistics, with emphasis on language acquisition, language learning strategies, and individual differences among language learners. Her work has examined how cognitive, affective, and contextual factors influence the process of learning additional languages, contributing to a more holistic understanding of language learning as a dynamic and complex phenomenon.

A central theme in Griffiths' research is the study of language learning strategies. She has explored how strategies are selected, adapted, and used by learners in diverse educational and cultural contexts. In addition to learner strategies, Griffiths has conducted research on teacher education, action research, and the global role of English.

== Works ==
Griffiths' books have focused on language learning, teaching, and learner differences. In 2008, she published Lessons from Good Language Learners. In 2017, she published Developing Teacher Autonomy through Action Research with Kenan Dikilitaş. Reviewing the book, Haris C. Adhikari noted that it is a "helpful and practical read"; however, he did imply that the book lacks sufficient discussion of contextual or cultural barriers and stated that "devoting a section to overcoming contextual and/or cultural barriers in the course of developing teacher autonomy would also be a judicious decision". In 2018, she published The Strategy Factor in Successful Language Learning: The Tornado Effect, a book on language learning strategies and their relationship to learner, situational, and classroom factors. The book was described as a "teacher-friendly" and "laudable culmination" of Griffiths' work. However, reviewer Núria Hernández observed that the book overlooks new trends in multilingual research and focuses heavily on nativelike norms.

In 2020, Griffiths co-authored Individual Differences in Language Learning: A Complex Systems Theory Perspective with Adem Soruç, a book examining individual differences in language learning through the lens of complex systems theory. Reviewing the book, Kelsey Ulrich-Verslycken characterized it as a "theoretically sound" and "approachable" analysis of individual differences in language acquisition, highlighting their "complex and dynamically intertwined" nature, while Mengyao Ma suggested it could include more recent research on "linguistic giftedness" and "positive psychology". She also published Lessons from Good Language Teachers with Zia Tajeddin. In 2023, her edited book The Practice of English as a Medium of Instruction (EMI) Around the World, a volume on the implementation of English-medium instruction in different regional contexts. In 2025, she edited Teacher Burnout from a Complex Systems Perspective, an edited volume on teacher burnout from the perspective of complex systems theory. A review praised it for offering a "holistic understanding" of teacher burnout.

== Bibliography ==
=== Selected books ===
- Griffiths, C., ed. (2008). Lessons from Good Language Learners. Cambridge University Press. ISBN 9780511497667.
- Dikilitaş, K.; Griffiths, C. (2017). Developing Language Teacher Autonomy through Action Research (1st ed.). Palgrave Macmillan Cham. ISBN 9783319507385.
- Griffiths, C. (2018). The Strategy Factor in Successful Language Learning: The Tornado Effect. Multilingual Matters. ISBN 9781783099757.
- Griffiths, C.; Soruç, A. (2020). Individual Differences in Language Learning: A Complex Systems Theory Perspective (1st ed.). Palgrave Macmillan Cham. ISBN 9783030528997.
- Griffiths, C. (2023). The Practice of English as a Medium of Instruction (EMI) Around the World (1st ed.). Cham: Springer. ISBN 9783031306129.
- Griffiths, C. (2024). Using Literature to Learn and Teach Language: The L3 Approach. Springer. ISBN 9783031545542.
- Griffiths, C. (2024). Language Intake: Understanding and Improving Language Learning and Teaching. Routledge. ISBN 9781032799896.
- Griffiths, C., ed. (2025). Teacher Burnout from a Complex Systems Perspective: Contributors, Consequences, Contexts and Coping Strategies. Palgrave Macmillan. ISBN 9783031850240.
