= Good language learner studies =

Group of academic studies in the area of second language acquisition

The good language learner (GLL) studies are a group of academic studies in the area of second language acquisition that deal with the strategies that good language learners exhibit. The rationale for the studies was that there is more benefit from studying the habits of successful language learners than there is from studying learners who fossilize at an early stage or stop studying altogether. It was thought that if the strategies of successful learners could be found, then that knowledge could help learners who were not getting such good results.

The original studies were made in the 1970s, but petered out in the 1980s as researchers concentrated on individual learning strategies. However, some research on the topic has also been carried out in more recent years. The main body of GLL research investigated language learning in classroom situations. It found that good language learners could not be distinguished on the basis of observable behavior alone, although personality did seem to have an effect. It also found that teachers did not treat these learners differently from other students, although they could distinguish good language learners from learners who were not so effective.

== Original studies ==
The first studies in the good language learner tradition were made by Joan Rubin and David Stern, both of which were completed in 1975. Both of these studies proposed similar lists of strategies that good language learners use. On the basis of this, a large-scale study was performed at the Ontario Institute for Studies in Education (OISE) which investigated 34 language learners with good learning habits. This study found a list of six different strategies, which were similar to those proposed by Rubin and Stern:

1. Good language learners find an appropriate style of learning.
2. Good language learners involve themselves in the language-learning process.
3. Good language learners develop an awareness of language as both system and communication.
4. Good language learners pay constant attention to expanding their language knowledge.
5. Good language learners develop the second language as a separate system.
6. Good language learners take into account the demands that second language learning imposes.

== Later work ==
In spite of the flurry of interest in the GLL in the mid to late 70s, in the 80s and 90s interest moved more in the direction of socio/cultural influences and individual differences, as well as developing the concept of communicative competence into a communicative approach to language teaching.

In the new millennium, Norton and Toohey re-visited the GLL. Their new perspective emphasized the influence of situation, investment and identity on successful language learning.

Seven years later, Griffiths, harking back to Joan Rubin's original title, published "Lessons from Good Language Learners". Whereas the early work in the GLL field had tended to emphasize the role of strategies, Griffiths' work took a broader view and presented the GLL as a highly complex being involving many different variables, including motivation, age, style, personality, gender, metacognition, autonomy, beliefs, culture and aptitude. In addition, the target variables (including grammar, vocabulary, pronunciation, function and skills) and some of the situational factors (including method and error correction practices) which learners must manage if they are to be successful were discussed.

== See also ==
- Individual variation in second language acquisition
- Interlanguage
