= Bilingualism (disambiguation) =

Bilingualism is the use of two languages, either by an individual speaker or by a community of speakers.

Bilingualism may also refer to:

- Bilingualism (neurology), the representation and effects of different language systems in the brain
- Bilingualism: Language and Cognition, a quarterly academic journal of linguistics

== See also ==
- Bilingual (disambiguation)
