= Comprehensible output =

Hypothesis in language acquisition

In the field of second language acquisition, there are many theories about the most effective way for language learners to acquire new language forms. One theory of language acquisition is the comprehensible output hypothesis.

Developed by Merrill Swain, the comprehensible output (CO) hypothesis states that learning takes place when learners encounter a gap in their linguistic knowledge of the second language (L2). By noticing this gap, learners become aware of it and may be able to modify their output so that they learn something new about the language. Although Swain does not claim that comprehensible output is solely responsible for all or even most language acquisition, she does claim that, under some conditions, CO facilitates second language learning in ways that differ from and enhance input due to the mental processes connected with the production of language. This hypothesis is closely related to the noticing hypothesis. Swain defines three functions of output:

1. Noticing function: Learners encounter gaps between what they want to say and what they are able to say, so they notice what they do not know or only know partially in this language.
2. Hypothesis-testing function: When a learner says something, there is always an at least tacit hypothesis underlying their error, e.g. about grammar. By uttering something, the learner tests this hypothesis and receives feedback from an interlocutor. This feedback enables reprocessing of the hypothesis if necessary.
3. Metalinguistic function: Learners reflect on the language they learn, and thereby the output enables them to control and internalize linguistic knowledge.

== Reception ==
Stephen Krashen argues that the basic problem with all output hypotheses is that output is rare, and comprehensible output is even rarer. Even when the language acquirer does speak, they rarely make the types of adjustments that the CO hypothesis claims are useful and necessary to acquire new forms. Another difficulty with CO is that pushing students to speak in a second language may be uncomfortable for them, raising the affective filter and thus hampering acquisition. When asked which aspects of foreign language learning caused them the most anxiety, students placed speaking in the foreign language at the top of the list. Methods that are based on comprehensible output frequently put acquirers in this uncomfortable position.

The comprehensible output theory is closely related to the need hypothesis, which states that we acquire language forms only when we need to communicate or make ourselves understood. If this hypothesis is correct, then language acquirers must be forced to speak.

According to Stephen Krashen, the need hypothesis is incorrect. However, Krashen does point out that need can be helpful when it places the acquirer in a position in which he or she can receive comprehensible input (CI). On the other hand, need is useless in the absence of CI.

Krashen uses a story invented by Garrison Keillor on the Prairie Home Companion, in a segment entitled "The Minnesota Language School", to argue against schools which operate on the need hypothesis. Their method is to take someone who speaks no German, fly them up in a helicopter, and then threaten to push them out of the helicopter unless they start speaking German. If the need hypothesis is correct, then this would work. Of course, this is an oversimplification that nonetheless makes this point in a very colorful way. Changing the hypothetical situation slightly, though, one might speculate about what would happen if the person were warned about his helicopter German test. The "helicopter test" may in fact be a misleading parallel: the need itself does not equate to learning—it merely creates the conditions for learning (or "intake") which the teacher can then take advantage of. If you were to explain to the person in the helicopter at that moment how a parachute works, you would probably achieve some degree of success in having them retain that information.

Furthermore, research suggests that humans can develop extremely high levels of language and literacy proficiency without any language output or production at all. Studies show that acquirers usually acquire small but significant amounts of new vocabulary through single exposure to a new word found in a comprehensible text. "Given the consistent evidence for comprehensible input, and the failure of other means of developing language competence, providing more comprehensible input seems to be a more reasonable strategy than increasing output," says Krashen.

Wolfgang Butzkamm proposes to extend Krashen's notion of comprehension. Both in natural language acquisition and in foreign language classrooms, in order for the learner to make progress, understanding must occur on two levels, a situational or functional and a formal or structural level. Learners must not only understand what is meant but also understand what is quite literally said, i.e. recognize the component parts and meaning elements. Only then can we, on the basis of what we've heard and understood, risk our own sentences, i.e. sentences we might never have heard before. "For the language system to be acquired, a double transparency or double comprehension is necessary. Much of the special nature of mother-child dialogue can be seen as aiming at both levels of comprehension/transparency." (p.84)
