= Pimsleur Language Programs =

Language learning company

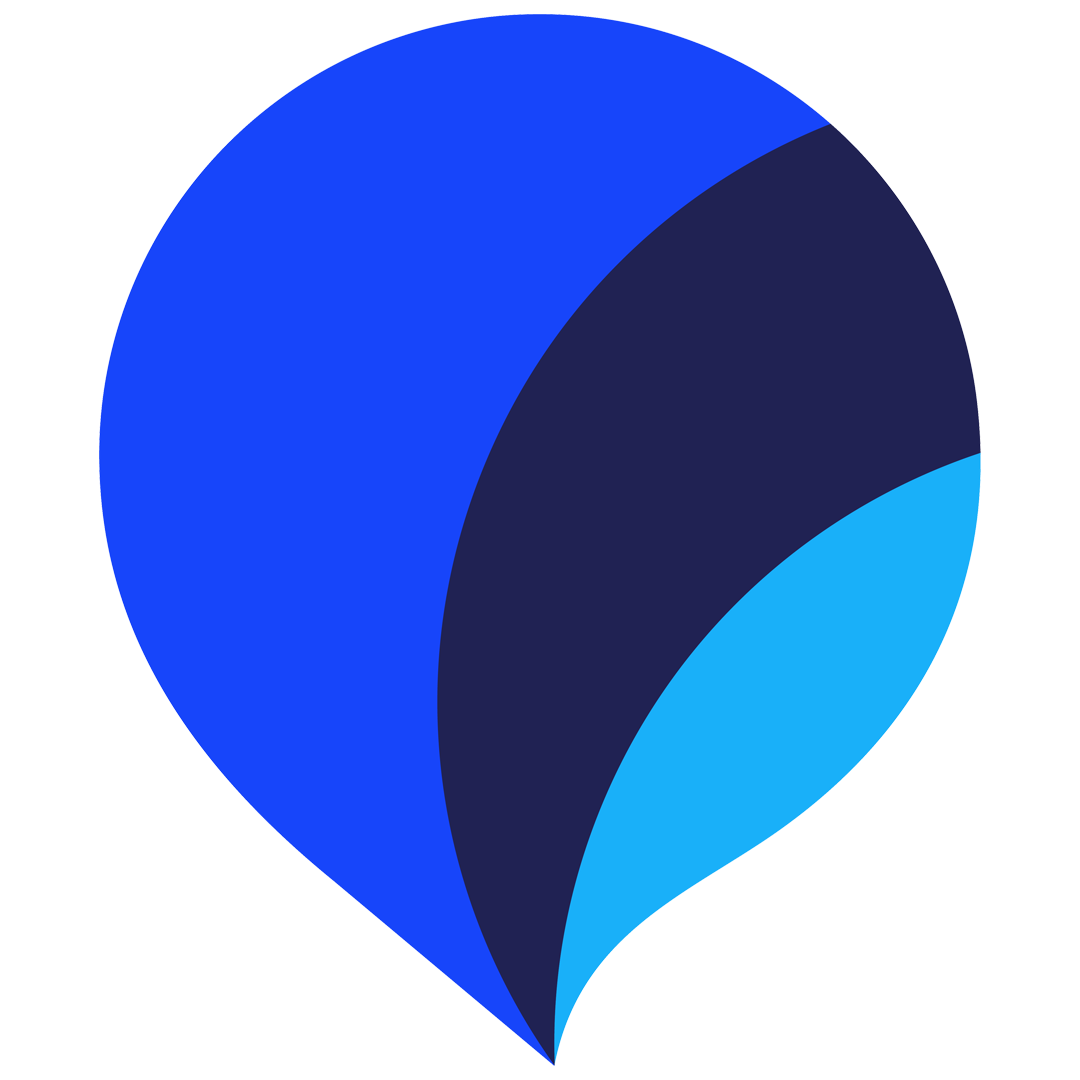
- Type: Division
- Industry: Publishing
- Founded: 1963
- Founders: Dr. Paul Pimsleur; Charles A.S. Heinle; Beverly Heinle
- Headquarters: Concord, Massachusetts, U.S.
- Area served: Worldwide
- Key people: Mary Green (Vice President, Executive Editor) Tom McLean (Senior Vice President, Pimsleur) Kelly Saux (Vice President, Marketing)
- Products: Pimsleur Language Programs
- Parent: Simon & Schuster, LLC (Kohlberg Kravis Roberts)
- Website: pimsleur.com

Pimsleur Language Programs (/ˈpɪmzlər/) is an American language-learning company that develops and publishes courses based on the Pimsleur Method, an audio-first pedagogy emphasizing speaking and listening via spaced repetition and anticipation techniques. The company is a division of Simon & Schuster and produces more than 50 language courses for English speakers, along with English-learning programs for speakers of other languages.

Pimsleur courses are available via subscription or lifetime purchase through the Pimsleur mobile and web applications. The app is supported on iOS, Android, a companion web app, and Amazon Alexa devices, and includes playback integration with Apple CarPlay and Android Auto for hands-free use while driving.

== History ==
Paul Pimsleur (1927–1976), a professor of applied linguistics and founding member of the American Council on the Teaching of Foreign Languages (ACTFL), developed the original Speak & Read series in the 1960s, including Essential Greek (1963), Essential French (1964), Essential Spanish (1966), and German Compact (1967). He later produced a Twi course for the Peace Corps in 1971. The programs were originally distributed under the title "A Tapeway Program".

Between 1969 and 1970, Pimsleur collaborated with Charles A. S. Heinle and Beverly D. Heinle of The Center for Curriculum Development in Philadelphia, who began marketing the courses under the name "CCD/Tapeway Programs". In 1974, Heinle acquired the rights to Pimsleur and established Heinle & Heinle Enterprises to continue development and distribution.

During the 1980s, the programs were sold under the brand "The Pimsleur Tapes" through Heinle & Heinle Enterprises in Concord, Massachusetts. SyberVision Systems founder Steven DeVore obtained an exclusive license to market the series, distributing it through direct-mail catalogs and televised infomercials that featured Beverly Pimsleur.

In 1995, Simon & Schuster Audio began distributing Pimsleur courses to bookstores, and in 1997 the company acquired full ownership of the Pimsleur catalog from Heinle & Heinle Enterprises. Following the acquisition, Simon & Schuster expanded the catalog to include more than 50 languages and over 200 individual courses, which continue to be produced in Concord, Massachusetts.

From 2005 onward, digital editions were released through online resellers, and in 2008 the company partnered with Nickelodeon to launch Speak Spanish with Dora & Diego, its first children’s line. The same year, Playaway was licensed to distribute the Pimsleur line to the U.S. military on pre-loaded players.

Following natural disasters in 2010 and 2011, Pimsleur made several of its courses freely available to humanitarian workers, including Haitian Creole and Japanese. In 2013, Pimsleur donated 15 lessons of its Tagalog course to support aid agencies and volunteers in the wake of Typhoon Haiyan.

In 2012, Pimsleur released Pimsleur Unlimited, an interactive software format for Spanish, German, French, and Italian courses, later expanded to additional languages.

In 2018, Pimsleur introduced a mobile app for iOS and Android devices integrating voice control through Amazon Alexa and cross-platform syncing. The release replaced the Pimsleur Unlimited series with Pimsleur Premium digital subscriptions.

In the same year, Pimsleur began offering a subscription-based model for its courses through its website in the United States, United Kingdom, Canada, and Australia. The subscription business model was later made available internationally via in-app purchase in the Pimsleur mobile app.

In 2021, the company launched an All Access plan providing access to its entire catalog of more than 50 languages under a single subscription.

In 2022, Pimsleur offered its Ukrainian Premium course at no cost to support humanitarian relief efforts during the crisis in Ukraine. The same year, it released Voice Coach, a speech-recognition feature providing pronunciation feedback to learners.

In 2024, Pimsleur launched Pimsleur Minis, a series of short, topic-focused lessons on culture, grammar, and vocabulary for its ten most popular languages.

In April 2025, Pimsleur added a Challenges & Rewards feature to its app, enabling users to earn points and badges through daily learning activities. In the United States, these points can be redeemed for third-party rewards.

In 2025, Pimsleur released All Access Lifetime worldwide, a one-time purchase plan granting permanent access to all Pimsleur language courses and digital learning tools across multiple devices. The same year, it launched an AI-driven Conversation Coach for Latin American Spanish, offering personalized lessons and lesson review.

In October 2025, the company added Korean Minis to its app, expanding its collection of short-form lessons.

In November 2025, the company added an integration with Spotify, allowing Pimsleur subscribers to play their lessons through the Spotify app.

== Methodology and science ==
The Pimsleur Method is an audio-first approach to second-language acquisition developed by Paul Pimsleur in the 1960s. It emphasizes speaking and listening before reading and writing, based on research in applied linguistics and cognitive psychology, indicating that oral proficiency is foundational to language competence.

The method stresses systematic review of material through "graduated-interval recall", a design related to the spacing effect in cognitive psychology. The spacing effect describes how information reviewed at increasing intervals is retained more effectively than material studied in a single session. Researchers in computer-assisted language learning have noted that the Pimsleur method was among the earliest to apply these spacing and lag principles in practical language instruction.

A review by Choe (2016) further notes that Pimsleur's sequencing of listening and speaking before reading parallels developmental stages in first-language acquisition, where comprehension and oral production precede literacy.

== Core pedagogical principles ==
The Pimsleur system is built around four core learning principles:

1. Graduated interval recall – material is revisited at systematically increasing intervals to strengthen long-term retention, applying the cognitive spacing effect.
2. Principle of anticipation – learners are prompted to recall or produce a phrase before hearing the correct version, fostering active recall and response formation.
3. Core vocabulary – instruction begins with high-frequency, functional words and expressions used in practical contexts.
4. Organic learning – grammatical structures are introduced through usage in conversation rather than explicit explanation.

Each 30-minute lesson is delivered through spoken dialogue, instructor prompts, and immediate recall tasks. Subsequent lessons integrate new vocabulary while recycling prior content at timed intervals. Reading lessons use a phonetic approach that trains learners to associate written symbols with the sounds they already know.

== Course structure ==
Pimsleur courses are primarily audio-based, focusing on the development of speaking and listening skills. Supplemental reading and study materials accompany the courses. Each speaking lesson is approximately 30 minutes in length. Courses are organized into "Levels", typically containing 30 speaking lessons per level and 20 reading lessons. The number of levels varies by language, ranging from one to five. For example, the French course includes five levels, totaling 150 speaking lessons, 100 reading lessons and roughly 80 hours of instruction.

The program's emphasis on speaking, listening, recall, and anticipation has been highlighted by cognitive science writers.

== Lesson structure ==
Each Pimsleur speaking lesson lasts about 30 minutes and follows a consistent pattern built around listening, speaking, repetition, and recall. Lessons begin with a short dialogue in the target language, which is then broken down and practiced under the guidance of an English-speaking instructor. New phrases are introduced gradually and reinforced through graduated-interval recall, requiring learners to anticipate and produce responses aloud.

Reviewers note that the sequence encourages active recall rather than passive listening, a format that can be used hands-free while commuting or performing daily tasks.

Separate reading lessons introduce the sounds of letters and syllables before moving to full-word reading. According to reviewers, "the reading lessons in Pimsleur start off by teaching how to read phonetically. After the sound system has been covered, you begin to see reading comprehension exercises in the course."

== Digital features ==
Since 2012, Pimsleur's mobile and web apps have extended the core audio program with interactive and gamified study tools.

The "Pimsleur Premium" adds digital flashcards, quick-match quizzes, pronunciation feedback through speech recognition, bonus vocabulary packs, Speak Easy interactive transcripts, and progress-tracking tools. Rolling Stone described the app as "one of the best for learning conversational fluency through audio lessons, now paired with smart review games." NBC News compared Pimsleur with Duolingo and Babbel, highlighting its focus on "speaking from day one."

Reviewers in outlets such as CNET and PCMag note that the app supports cross-platform syncing, offline downloads, and compatibility with Apple CarPlay and Android Auto, enabling hands-free study.

Apple selected Pimsleur as one of its "Apps of the Day" for promoting language learning "while taking care of everyday tasks." Reviewers in outlets such as USA Today and Oprah Magazine have described it as accessible for beginners and convenient for hands-free study, while PCMag rated Pimsleur 3.5 out of 5 stars, praising its speaking-practice design but noting its limited grammar instruction and higher cost compared with competitors.

== Languages ==
Pimsleur Language Programs offers courses for 50 different languages other than English. Pimsleur also teaches English as a second or foreign language (ESL) for 15 languages.

Languages & lessons offered for English speakers
Language	Levels offered	Total number of lessons	Notes
Albanian	1	10	Premium available
Arabic (Eastern)	3	90	Premium available
Arabic (Egyptian)	1	30	Premium available
Arabic (Modern Standard)	3	90	Premium available
Armenian (Eastern)	1	10	Premium available
Armenian (Western)	1	10	Premium available
Chinese (Cantonese)	1	30	Premium available
Chinese (Mandarin)	5	150	Premium available
Croatian	1	30	Premium available
Czech	1	30	Premium available
Danish	1	30	Premium available
Dari	2	60	Premium available
Dutch	1	30	Premium available
Persian	2	60	Premium available
Finnish	1	30	Premium available
French	5	150	Premium available
German	5	150	Premium available
Greek	2	60	Premium available
Haitian Creole	1	30	Premium available
Hebrew	3	90	Premium available
Hindi	2	60	Premium available
Hungarian	1	30	Premium available
Icelandic	1	30	Premium available
Indonesian	1	30	Premium available
Inglés	3	90	Premium available
Irish	1	10	Premium available
Italian	5	150	Premium available
Japanese	5	150	Premium available
Korean	5	150	Premium available
Lithuanian	1	30	Premium available
Norwegian	2	60	Premium available
Ojibwe	1	30	Premium available
Pashto	2	60	Premium available
Polish	1	30	Premium available
Brazilian Portuguese	5	150	Premium available
European Portuguese	2	60	Premium available
Punjabi	1	30	Premium available
Romanian	1	30	Premium available
Russian	5	150	Premium available
Spanish (Latin American)	5	150	Premium available
European Spanish	5	150	Premium available
Swahili	1	30	Premium available
Swedish	1	30	Premium available
Swiss German	1	10	Premium available
Tagalog	2	60	Premium available
Thai	1	30	Premium available
Turkish	1	30	Premium available
Twi	1	10	Premium available
Ukrainian	1	30	Premium available
Urdu	1	30	Premium available
Vietnamese	1	30	Premium available

Languages & lessons offered for English as a Second Language
Language	Levels offered	Total number of lessons	Notes
إنجليزي	1	30	not available
英文	1	30	not available
英語	1	30	not available
انگلیسی	1	30	not available
Anglais	1	30	not available
Englisch	1	30	not available
Angle	1	30	not available
अंग्रेज़ी	1	30	not available
Inglese	2	60	not available
英語	5	150	not available
영어	1	30	not available
Inglês	1	30	not available
английский	1	30	not available
Inglés	3	90	Premium available
Tiếng Anh	1	30	not available

== Research ==
Vesselinov et al. evaluated Pimsleur's Spanish Level 1 with 82 beginner learners using ACTFL's Oral Proficiency Interview by Computer (OPIc). After eight weeks of study, 83% of participants who completed all 30 lessons improved their oral-proficiency rating by at least one level (up to three), while 73% of those who studied for at least eight hours also advanced. They also reported high user satisfaction among the sample.

== Corporate structure ==
Pimsleur Language Programs is owned by Simon & Schuster Audio, a division of Simon & Schuster, which is part of Kohlberg Kravis Roberts.

=== Offices ===
- Corporate headquarters are in New York, New York.
- Editorial offices are in Concord, Massachusetts. All courses are developed, produced, and recorded at this location.

== See also ==
- Language education
- List of language self-study programs
