= Second-language phonology =

Sound organisation in a second language

The phonology of second languages is different from the phonology of first languages in various ways. The differences are considered to come from general characteristics of second languages, such as slower speech tempo, lower proficiency than native speakers, and from the interaction between non-native speakers' first and second languages.

Research on second-language phonology has been done not only on segments, but also on prosody. Second-language prosody, like second-language segments, has been studied in terms of both its global characteristics and the interactions between first languages and second languages.

== First language to second language ==
=== Global second-language prosody characteristics ===
==== Speech rate ====
L2 speech rate is typically slower than native speech. For example, Mandarin Chinese speakers’ speech rate in an English utterance is slower than native English speakers’ speech rate (Derwing and Munro, 1995), and speech rates in a sentence by highly experienced Italian and Korean nonnative speakers of English are slower than that of native English speakers' (Guion et al., 2000). In this study, the main factor of the slower speech rate for the Italian and Korean accented English was the durations of the vowels and sonorant consonants (Guion et al., 2000). Another source of the slower speech rate in L2 speech is that L2 speakers tend to not reduce function words, such as "the" or "and," as much as native speakers (Aoyama and Guion, 2007). The generally slower speech rate in L2 speech is correlated with the degree of perceived foreign accent by native listeners (Derwing and Munro, 1997).

=== Interaction between first- and second-language prosody ===
L2 speech is influenced by the speaker's L1 background. Such influences have been explored in relation to many prosodic features, such as pitch perception and pitch excursion (Beckman, 1986; Aoyama and Guion, 2007), stress placement (Archibald, 1995, 1998a, 1998b; Flege and Bohn, 1989; Archibald, 1997), syllable structure (Broselow and Park, 1995; Broslow, 1988; Eckman, 1991), and tone (Sereno and Wang, 2007; Guion and Pederson, 2007).

==== Pitch perception and pitch excursions ====
When perceiving accented syllables in English, Japanese nonnative speakers of English tend to rely only on F0, or pitch of the accented syllables, while native speakers use F0, duration, and amplitude (Beckman, 1986). This finding was confirmed in production, by showing that the excursions of F0 of English content words were larger for Japanese nonnative speakers of English than for native English speakers (Aoyama and Guion, 2007).

In both studies, the reason for this phenomenon was proposed to be related to the characteristics of the nonnative speakers’ L1, Japanese. Japanese is a mora-timed language, and because of this, longer syllable duration makes a phonological difference in Japanese. Therefore, when expressing stress in Japanese, Japanese speakers may rely more on F0 than duration, which is a critical cue for a different phonological distinction. This L1 characteristic might interfere with Japanese speakers’ perception and production of English, which is a stress-timed language and might be free of such durational restrictions.

==== Stress placement on words ====
Influence from L1 to L2 was also found in stress placement on words. Hungarian learners of English tend to place initial stress on English words that do not have initial stress, because Hungarian has fixed initial stress and this is transferred to Hungarian speakers' L2 English prosody (Archibald, 1995; 1998a; 1998b). Spanish speakers of English were found not to stress target stressed syllables in English, and this might be due to the lack of stress in Spanish cognates and the lexical similarity between Spanish and English words (Flege and Bohn, 1989). In addition, it is suggested that speakers of tone languages (e.g., Chinese) and pitch-accent languages (e.g., Japanese), both of which use pitch as a phonologically meaningful item, do not compute stress placement in English, but rather store the stress information lexically (Archibald, 1997).

==== Syllable structure ====
L2 speakers can also perceive some innate characteristics of the L2, which lead to different repair strategies for different phonological patterns. Korean L2 speakers of English add an extra final vowel to some English words but not to all (Broslow and Park, 1995), as in (1).

(1) Korean pronunciations of English words

Korean accented pronunciation	English word	Korean accented pronunciation	English word
bit^{h}ɨ	“beat”	bit	“bit”
c^{h}ip^{h}ɨ	“cheap”	t^{h}ip	“tip”
p^{h}ik^{h}ɨ	“peak”	p^{h}ik	“pick”
rut^{h}ɨ	“route”	gut	“good”
k^{h}ot^{h}ɨ	“coat”	buk	“book”

The problem is that modern Korean does not have a phonological vowel length difference, and Korean speakers show their own repair mechanism for English minimal pairs that have tense/lax difference, by adding an extra final vowel to English words with tense vowels. This might be because Korean learners of English attempt to preserve the mora count of the original English word, by adding an extra final vowel to words that have two moras (Broslow and Park, 1995). The syllable structure of such a word might look like in (2)

(2) Syllable structure of English “beat” by Korean nonnative speakers of English (adapted from Broslow and Park, 1995).

==== Tone: second-language perception, production, and learning ====
L2 listeners show different patterns of tone perception in tone languages, such as Mandarin Chinese. In Guion and Pederson (2007), native listeners of Mandarin judged the similarity of synthesized Mandarin tones on the basis of both F0 and F0 slope, while English and Japanese listeners used only F0, not F0 slope. However, it was also observed that late learners of Mandarin showed similar patterns of tone perception as native listeners of Mandarin, focusing on both F0 and F0 slope of the tones. This suggests that L2 learners can learn to attend to the cues that L1 speakers use for the tone distinction.

The possibility of learning new L2 prosodic distinction was further explored in a training study on Mandarin tones (Sereno and Wang, 2007). English L2 listeners’ perception and production of Mandarin tones improved after perceptual training, and this was observed both behaviorally and cortically: L2 listeners’ accuracy of tone perception and production improved, and increased activity of language areas in the left hemisphere (superior temporal gyrus) and neighboring effects on relevant neural areas were observed.

==== Intonation ====
- Dutch English
- Willems (1982): size and direction of pitch movements
- Korean and Mandarin Englishes
- McGory (1997): nonnatives put pitch accents both on prominent and less prominent words, f0 patterns of statements and questions indistinct, different L1 backgrounds showed different error patterns

== Second language to first language ==
- Phonetic Realization of Phonological Intonation
- Dutch Greek
- Ineke Mennen (2004): Both L1 and L2 influence each other in terms of phonetic realization of phonological intonation.

== Teaching second language pronunciation ==
Before the popularity of communicative teaching methods in the late 70s, pronunciation teaching through audio-lingual method (ALM) had a central place in language education. This emphasis shifted in the late 70's when the prevalent obsession with aural-oral drills, native-like accuracy, consonant pair repetition and the centrality of pronunciation was replaced by a concern for meaningful communication. For nearly a decade, it was assumed that listening to language was enough to develop pronunciation. This concern again saw a shift in the late 80's when pronunciation again found a place in desired language teaching outcomes due to an increased need to develop L2 learners' pronunciation of the second language. In the 80's and 90's seminal pedagogical texts written by Judy Gilbert and Celce-Murcia paved the path for a more interactive and meaningful way of teaching pronunciation in the 21st century. These approaches are a combination of audio-lingual and communicative methods, have still retained the minimum pair drill format, but there is increased emphasis on interaction and also suprasegmental features such as stress, intonation and rhythm.
