= François Grosjean =

French psycho-linguist, academic and author

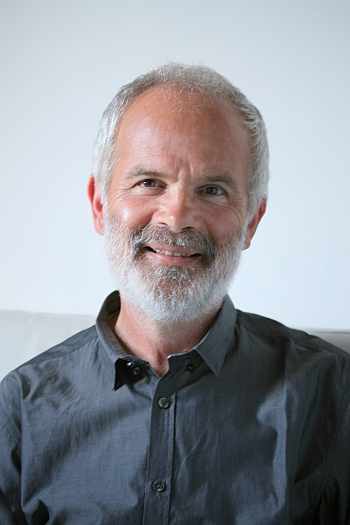
François Grosjean in 2011

François Grosjean is a Professor Emeritus and former Director of the Language and Speech Processing Laboratory at the University of Neuchâtel (Switzerland). His specialty is psycholinguistics and his domains of interest are the perception, comprehension and production of language, be it speech or sign language, in monolinguals and bilinguals. He also has interests in biculturalism, applied linguistics, aphasia, sign language, and natural language processing. He is better known for his work on bilingualism in which he has investigated the holistic view of bilingualism, language mode, the complementarity principle, and the processing of code-switching and borrowing. In one of his most-cited papers, Grosjean argues that hearing-impaired children have the right to grow up bilingual, learning two languages—namely, sign language and oral language.

Grosjean was born in Paris (France) in 1946, son of Roger Grosjean, a French archaeologist and double-agent during World War II, and of Angela (Jill) Shipway Pratt, a British top model in Paris and then race horse breeder in Italy. Grosjean spent his youth in France (Villiers-Adam), Switzerland (Aiglon College in Chesières) and England, where he attended Ratcliffe College. He received his degrees up to the Doctorat d'Etat from the University of Paris, France. He started his academic career at the University of Paris 8 and then left for the United States in 1974, where he taught and did research in psycholinguistics at Northeastern University. While at Northeastern, Grosjean was also a Research Affiliate at the Speech Communication Laboratory at MIT. In 1987, he was appointed professor at the University of Neuchâtel, Switzerland; he founded the Language and Speech Processing Laboratory and headed it for twenty years. In addition to his academic appointments, Grosjean has lectured occasionally at the Universities of Basel, Zurich and Oxford. In 1998, he cofounded Bilingualism: Language and Cognition, a Cambridge University Press journal.

In 2019, Grosjean published his autobiography, "A Journey in Languages and Cultures: The Life of a Bicultural Bilingual" (Oxford University Press).

== Books ==
- Grosjean, F. (1982). Life with Two Languages: An Introduction to Bilingualism. Cambridge, Mass: Harvard University Press.
- Lane, H. and Grosjean, F. (Eds.). (1982). Recent Perspectives on American Sign Language. Hillsdale, New Jersey: Lawrence Erlbaum.
- Grosjean, F. and Frauenfelder, U. (Eds.). (1997). A Guide to Spoken Word Recognition Paradigms. Hove, England: Psychology Press.
- Grosjean, F. (2008). Studying Bilinguals. Oxford: Oxford University Press.
- Grosjean, F. (2010). Bilingual: Life and Reality. Cambridge, Mass: Harvard University Press.
- Grosjean, F. & Dommergues, J-Y. (2011). La statistique en clair. Paris, France: Ellipses Edition.
- Grosjean, F. (2011). Roger Grosjean: Itinéraires d'un archéologue. Ajaccio, France: Editions Alain Piazzola.
- Grosjean, F. & Li, P. (2013). The Psycholinguistics of Bilingualism. Malden, MA & Oxford: Wiley-Blackwell.
- Grosjean, F. (2015). Parler plusieurs langues: Le monde des bilingues. Paris, France: Albin Michel.
- Grosjean, F. (2015). Bilinguismo. Miti e Realtà. Milan, Italy: Mimesis.
- Grosjean, F. (2016). A la recherche de Roger et Sallie. Hauterive, Switzerland: Editions Attinger.
- Grosjean, F. & Byers-Heinlein, K. (2018). The Listening Bilingual: Speech Perception, Comprehension and Bilingualism. Hoboken, NJ & Oxford: Wiley-Blackwell.
- Grosjean, F. (2019). A Journey in Languages and Cultures: The Life of a Bicultural Bilingual. Oxford: Oxford University Press.
- Grosjean, F. (2021). Life as a Bilingual: Knowing and Using Two or More Languages. Cambridge: Cambridge University Press.
- Grosjean, F. (2022). The Mysteries of Bilingualism: Unresolved Issues. Hoboken, NJ & Oxford: Wiley-Blackwell.
- Grosjean, F. (2024). On Bilinguals and Bilingualism. Cambridge: Cambridge University Press.
