= Merrill Swain =

Canadian applied linguist

Merrill Swain is a Canadian applied linguist whose research has focused on second language acquisition (SLA). Some of her most notable contributions to SLA research include the Output Hypothesis and her research related to immersion education. Swain is a Professor Emerita at the Ontario Institute for Studies in Education (OISE) at the University of Toronto. Swain is also known for her work with Michael Canale on communicative competence. Swain was the president of the American Association for Applied Linguistics in 1998. She received her PhD in psychology at the University of California. Swain has co-supervised 64 PhD students.

== The Output Hypothesis ==
Merrill Swain came to propose the Output Hypothesis based on her observations of French immersion classrooms that very rarely did students say anything longer than a clause, and that many graduates of French immersion programs still had grammatical inaccuracies in their speech that never went away even after many years of immersion education. In contrast with Stephen Krashen’s 1977 Input Hypothesis, Swain’s Output Hypothesis posited that comprehensible input on its own is not enough for language learning.

The Output Hypothesis proposes that “through producing language, either spoken or written, language acquisition/learning may occur”, because learners are more likely to notice gaps in their knowledge when producing output, and learn as a result of trying to fill that gap.

The Output Hypothesis attributes three main functions to the production of language (output) that are relevant to language learning:

1. The noticing/triggering function - in attempting to produce language, learners may become aware of a gap between their intended meaning and the form closest to that meaning that they can produce using their current knowledge.
2. The hypothesis-testing function - output can be a reflection of hypotheses about the language that learners are testing.
3. The metalinguistic (reflective) function - “using language to reflect on language produced by others or the self mediates second language learning”.

== Immersion Education ==
Merrill Swain has contributed significantly to immersion pedagogy through her extensive observation and research of French immersion classrooms and other second language learning contexts. In the 1970s, immersion education in Canada centrally focused on comprehensible input, achieved by teaching school subjects in French. In the 1970s, Swain pushed for change in the way immersion language teaching was conducted. Swain pointed out in a 1974 paper co-authored by Henry Barik about their observations in French immersion classrooms in two schools in Elgin county that, even after many years in the immersion program, “some of the errors do not disappear”. Therefore, Swain pushed for a “combination of emphasis on grammatical accuracy and … meaningful communication from the very start”. Swain hypothesized that when exposed to content instruction in the target language, learners can deduce the meaning of language through contextual knowledge without needing to understand grammatical structures, and that it is more difficult to use this kind of shortcut when producing output. Swain suggested that students should be given more opportunities to produce output in the target language, as it would cause students to better notice structural aspects of the language. These ideas formed the basis of Swain’s Output Hypothesis.

Merrill Swain’s research also showed that teachers’ typical language use was limited in the variety of grammatical forms used, which meant that students had a low amount of exposure to those forms not used by teachers. This lopsided input was a factor in students’ continued inaccuracies in some forms. To remedy this, Swain suggested that teachers should design activities that “naturally elicit particular uses of language”.

== Awards ==
- 2003: Recipient of the Robert Roy award, given by the Canadian Association of Second Language Teachers for her contributions to the field of second language education.
- 2004: Recipient of the Distinguished Scholarship and Service Award, given by the American Association for Applied Linguistics for her contributions to the field of applied linguistics.

== Writing ==
Merrill Swain is the co-author or co-editor of 12 books or special issues, 95 book chapters, and 135 papers in refereed journals. Listed here is a small sample of her numerous works.

- Barik, H. C., & Swain, M. (1974). English-French bilingual education in the early grades: The Elgin study. The Modern Language Journal, 58(8), 392-403.
- Harley, B., & Swain, M. (1978). Form and Function in a Second Language: A Close Look at the Verb System
- Nassaji, H., & Swain, M. (2000). A Vygotskian Perspective on Corrective Feedback in L2: The Effect of Random versus Negotiated Help on the Learning of English Articles. Language Awareness, 9(1), 34-51.
- Swain, M. (2013). Cognitive and affective enhancement among older adults: the role of languaging. Australian Review of Applied Linguistics, 36(1), 4-19.
- Swain, M. (1996). Discovering Successful Second Language Teaching Strategies and Practices: From Programme Evaluation to Classroom Experimentation. Journal of Multilingual and Multicultural Development, 17(2-4), 89-104.
- Swain, M. (1974). French immersion programs across Canada: Research findings. The Canadian Modern Language Review/La Revue Canadienne Des Langues Vivantes, 31(2), 117-129.
- Swain, M. (1996). Integrating language and content in immersion classrooms: research perspectives: [1]. The Canadian Modern Language Review, 52(4), 529-548.
- Swain, M. (2001). Integrating Language and Content Teaching through Collaborative Tasks. The Canadian Modern Language Review/La Revue Canadienne Des Langues Vivantes, 58(1), 44-63.
- Swain, M. (1988). Manipulating and Complementing Content Teaching to Maximize Second Language Learning. TESL Canada Journal/Revue TESL Du Canada, 6(1), 68-83.
- Swain, M. (1978). School Reform through Bilingual Education: Problems and Some Solutions in Evaluating Programs. Comparative Education Review, 22(3), 420-433.
- Swain, M. (2013). The inseparability of cognition and emotion in second language learning. Language Teaching, 46(2), 195-207.
- Swain, M. (1997). The Output Hypothesis, Focus on Form and Second Language Learning. In Vivien Berry, Bob Adamson, William Littlewood (Eds.), Applying linguistics: Insights into language in education (pp 1–21). Hong Kong: University of Hong Kong, English Centre.
- Swain, M. (1993). The output hypothesis: just speaking and writing aren't enough. The Canadian Modern Language Review, 50(1), 158-164.
- Swain, M. (1981). Time and Timing in Bilingual Education. Language Learning, 31(1), 1-15.
- Swain, M., Brooks, L., & Tocalli-Beller, A. (2002). Peer-Peer Dialogue as a Means of Second Language Learning. Annual Review of Applied Linguistics, 22, 171-185.
- Swain, M., & Deters, P. (2007). "New" Mainstream SLA Theory: Expanded and Enriched. The Modern Language Journal, 91(5), 820-836.
- Swain, M., & Lapkin, S. (2013). A Vygotskian sociocultural perspective on immersion education: The L1/L2 debate. Journal of Immersion and Content-Based Language Education, 1(1), 101-129.
- Swain, M., & Lapkin, S. (2000). Task-Based Second Language Learning: The Uses of the First Language. Language Teaching Research, 4(3), 251-274.
- Swain, M., & Lapkin, S. (1995). Problems in output and the cognitive processes they generate: A step towards second language learning. Applied Linguistics, 16(3), 371-391.
- Tarone, E., & Swain, M. (1995). A sociolinguistic perspective on second language use in immersion classrooms. The Modern Language Journal, 79(2), 166.
- Tarone, E., Swain, M., & Fathman, A. (1976). Some Limitations to the Classroom Applications of Current Second Language Acquisition Research. TESOL Quarterly, 10(1), 19-32.
