= CANAL-F =

Test measuring language aptitude

The Cognitive Ability for Novelty in Acquisition of Language – Foreign (CANAL-F) is a test measuring language aptitude, or whether and how well a person can learn a second language. It was developed by Grigorenko, Sternberg, and Ehrman in 2000, using "acquisition processes" as a theoretical base. This is a somewhat different approach to testing language aptitude. The test uses an artificially-constructed language called Ursulu to test for language aptitude. The Pimsleur Language Aptitude Battery, published in 1966, also uses an artificial language to test for grammatical sensitivity.

== Impetus ==
CANAL-F was developed as an alternative to another aptitude test, the Modern Language Aptitude Test (MLAT). Although developed in the 1950s, in recent years, the MLAT has been sometimes associated with a language teaching methodology known as the audiolingual method, largely popular in the mid and late1960s and characterized by repetitive drills. The audiolingual method fell out of vogue in the 1970s. The MLAT, although still used successfully in a number and variety of different contexts and countries, did not reflect the latest thinking in how language is acquired, developed and maintained in the mind of the learner, so a new tool was desired which could better address the revised theories of language, especially insofar as cognitive theory is concerned.

== Organizing Principles ==
While based on Carroll's theoretical work, the CANAL-F takes a slightly different approach to assessing foreign language aptitude. The test aims to measure:

- ability for acquiring vocabulary,
- comprehending extended texts,
- extracting grammatical rules and
- making semantic inferences

all in the context of the major underlying feature of language aptitude being an ability for the learner to cope with novelty and ambiguity.

== Reception ==
Rod Ellis points out that despite CANAL-F using a new formulation of language aptitude as its base, the results it gets are very similar to those of the MLAT. He says, however, that one advantage of CANAL-F is that it "does afford the possibility of achieving a closer match between specific aptitudes and specific psycholinguistic processes". While sample items were included in the original article, the full CANAL-F test is not commercially available.
