= Reza Pishghadam =

Linguist and language-education scholar

- رضا پیش‌قدم
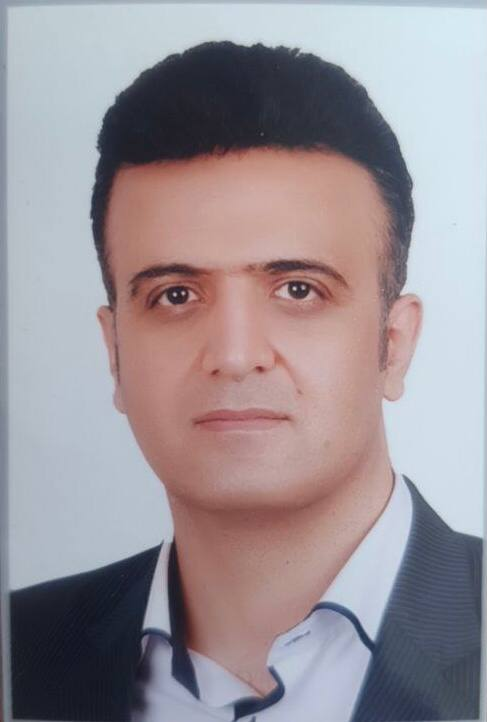
- Prof. Dr. Reza Pishghadam
- Born: August 23, 1977 (age 49); Mashhad, Iran

Academic work
- Discipline: Linguistics
- Sub-discipline: Applied linguistics

Reza Pishghadam (Persian: رضا پیش‌قدم) is an Iranian professor of language education. He is affiliated with Ferdowsi University of Mashhad and Gulf College in Oman. He is also an honorary professor at Tashkent University of Economics and Pedagogy in Uzbekistan.

== Early life and education ==
Pishghadam was born in Mashhad in 1977. He received his BA in English Language and Literature from Ferdowsi University of Mashhad, Iran, in 2001. He completed both his MA and Ph.D. in English Language Education at Allameh Tabataba'i University, Iran, in 2007. He joined Ferdowsi University of Mashhad as a faculty member in 2007.

== Academic career ==
He was vice president for academic affairs from 2018 to 2022. Since 2022, he has been a senior education and research consultant at Gulf College, Oman. He was awarded an honorary professorship at Tashkent University of Economics and Pedagogy in Uzbekistan.

== Editorial roles ==
Pishghadam has been editor-in-chief of the International Journal of Society, Culture and Language (IJSCL) since 2013, a predatory open access journal on Beall's List . Since 2022, he has been director-in-charge of the Journal of Language and Translation Studies (LTS) and of the Journal of Business, Communication and Technology (BCT).

== Awards and honors ==
- Named among the top 1% of scientists in Iran on the Islamic World Science & Technology Monitoring and Citation Institute (ISC) index (2022–2025)
- Distinguished Researcher of Humanities in Iran (2010)
- Top Educational Professor, awarded by Iran's Ministry of Science, Research, and Technology (2021)
- Selected as Top Researcher in Humanities of Razavi Khorasan Province, Iran (2022)
