= DLab =

DLab was a school for producers of videogames and interactive software in Italy that ran from 2002 to 2007. It offered courses in the towns of Arezzo, Florence and Ferrara.

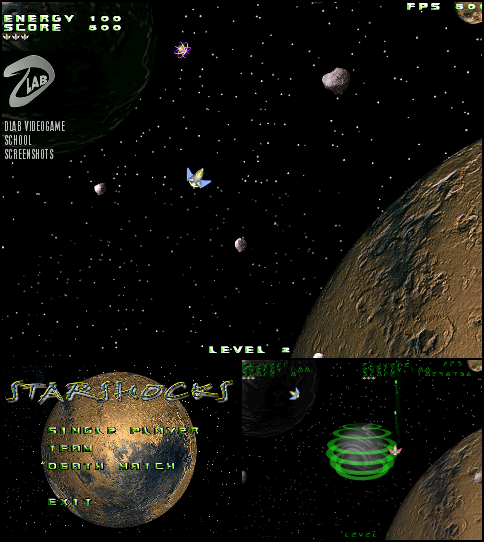
Three screenshots from the game Starshocks.

It was founded in 2002 by Fabio Barzagli of Nayma Software and Bernardo Innocenti of Develer. Dlab organized courses with partners such as Cooperativa Sociale Electra, ITIS Galileo Galilei Arezzo, Develer SRL, ISA Firenze, ITIS Carpeggiani Ferrara and Centro Studi CS Pistoia, Regione Toscana. It received grants of over 200,000 Euros from the European Social Fund.
