= Richard Schmidt (linguist) =

American linguist and professor

Richard Schmidt (1941–2017) was an American linguist and professor in the Department of Language Studies, University of Hawaii. His chief research interests were cognitive factors and affective factors in adult second-language acquisition, and he was most known for developing the noticing hypothesis. He was the president of the American Association for Applied Linguistics in 2003, and most recently served as a senior consultant for the National Foreign Language Resource Center at the University of Hawaii at Manoa.
