= ColorSounds =

Television series

ColorSounds was a national music video program televised on PBS stations in the mid-1980s. ColorSounds taught viewers how to read and speak English creatively through the use of music videos.

In this series, a music video, the same one that would appear on channels such as MTV and VH1 is presented, with the lyrics shown karaoke-style on the bottom of the screen, with words associated with the video's focus highlighted in various colors.

For example, if a music video featured nouns, every noun in the lyrics would be highlighted in red; accordingly, if another music video featured vowels sounds such as "a" all the a's would be highlighted in gray.

ColorSounds presented an effective learning program through its multimodal approach to teaching and learning language.

In addition, ColorSounds also noted and corrected spelling mistakes and poor grammar in the original lyrics.

The show had no host, announcer or theme songs—the topics to be covered in that particular episode is displayed silently as a static caption at the start of the program or segment.

Color Sounds was packaged in two formats—a 30-minute version for general PBS scheduling, and a 15-minute version for use during in-school telecasts.
