= Language-learning aptitude =

Relative ability to learn a foreign language

Language learning aptitude refers to the "prediction of how well, relative to other individuals, an individual can learn a foreign language in a given amount of time and under given conditions". Foreign language aptitude itself has been defined as a set of cognitive abilities which predicts L2 learning rate, or how fast learners can increase their proficiency in a second or foreign language, and L2 ultimate attainment, or how close learners will get to being able to communicate like a native in a second or foreign language, both in classroom and real-world situations. Understanding aptitude is crucial for a complete picture of the process of second language acquisition. Knowledge about language aptitude has profound impacts in the field of Applied Linguistics, particularly in Second Language Acquisition (SLA) theory and in the practice of teaching and learning languages.

As a concept with historical origins in education and psychology, its application in applied linguistics will constantly be influenced by the latest findings in those disciplines of study. Following a revolution in studies of human cognition over the last few decades and major contributions, especially from the fields of cognitive psychology and cognitive neuroscience, our understanding of human cognitive abilities has increased significantly. In other words, contemporary discussions of foreign language aptitude in applied linguistics would be substantially insufficient if not for research advances in other fields.

As with many measures of aptitude, language learning aptitude is thought to be relatively stable once a person matures.

== Language learning disability ==
Some high schools, universities or other institutions will interpret low language learning aptitude as a sign of a language learning disability. A pattern of evidence from several sources can help to diagnose a foreign language learning disability. Evidence can come from scoring poorly on language learning aptitude assessments, like the Modern Language Aptitude Test, Pimsleur Language Aptitude Battery, Modern Language Aptitude Test – Elementary or Defense Language Aptitude Battery, while attaining average or above-average scores on aptitude assessments in other areas, like general intelligence. A history of scoring poorly on an array of language aptitude tests taken at the appropriate time (MLAT-E for grades 3–6, PLAB for grades 7–12, MLAT for adults) can provide even stronger evidence for a language learning disability. Evidence can also come from comparing a poor past performance in foreign language courses with above-average performance in other courses unrelated to language learning.

Language aptitude is one of the important factors that determined L2 later learners' ultimate achievement, but it has less effect on L2 early learners.

== John B. Carroll ==
John B. Carroll, an influential psychologist in the field of educational linguistics, developed a theory about a cluster of four abilities that factored into language learning aptitude, separate from verbal intelligence and motivation. Using these four distinct abilities (phonetic coding ability, grammatical sensitivity, rote learning ability, and inductive learning ability), Carroll developed the MLAT, a language aptitude assessment for adults.

The four ability components are defined as follows:

| Component | Definition |
|---|---|
| Phonetic coding ability | ability to perceive distinct sounds, associate a symbol with that sound and retain that association |
| Grammatical sensitivity | ability to recognize the grammatical function of a lexical element (word, phrase, etc.) in a sentence without explicit training in grammar |
| Rote learning ability | ability to learn associations between words in a foreign language and their meanings and retain that association |
| Inductive learning ability | ability to infer or induce rules governing the structure of a language |

== Paul Pimsleur ==
Paul Pimsleur, also known for the Pimsleur language learning system, spent time researching four factors that he believed to be related to language learning aptitude. Pimsleur included grade point average as an indication of general academic achievement as well as motivation in his factors. In addition, the verbal ability factor indicated how well a student would be able to handle the mechanics of learning a foreign language and the auditory factor indicated how well a student would be able to listen to and produce phrases in a foreign language. To test these four factors, Pimsleur developed the Pimsleur Language Aptitude Battery, which is available through the Language Learning and Testing Foundation.

== Uses of aptitude measurement ==
Measurements of language learning aptitude are used in many different ways. The United States Department of Defense uses a measurement of language learning aptitude, the Defense Language Aptitude Battery, to help place employees in positions that require them to learn a new language.

Governmental agencies use the MLAT as a tool to select and place employees in intensive language training programs. Businesses and missionaries use the MLAT to select, place and plan for language training. Universities, colleges and high schools use the MLAT to help in the diagnosis of foreign language learning disabilities. Although each institution has its own policy, many will waive a foreign language requirement in cases of a foreign language learning disability in favor of a history or linguistic course.

Schools use the PLAB and MLAT-E to place students in suitable language courses, build a history of a foreign language learning difficulty, identify especially gifted students in respect to language learning and to match learning styles with instructional styles.

== Aptitude tests ==
Aptitude Measurements
| Measurement | Description |
|---|---|
| Modern Language Aptitude Test | Mainly authored by John B. Carroll, appropriate for adults, mainly used by government and military institutions to select and place employees for language training |
| Defense Language Aptitude Battery | Developed and used by the United States Department of Defense to select candidates for jobs that will require them to attain fluency in a foreign language |
| Pimsleur Language Aptitude Battery | Authored by Paul Pimsleur, used to assess the language learning aptitude of students in grades 7 to 12 |
| Modern Language Aptitude Test – Elementary | Mainly authored by John B. Carroll, appropriate for children in grades 3 to 6 |
| Cognitive Ability for Novelty in Acquisition of Language – Foreign | Developed by Grigorenko, Sternberg, and Ehrman in 2000, using a new concept of language aptitude as a theoretical base |

== See also ==
- Aptitude
- Hardest language

== Resources ==
- Carroll, John B. and Stanley Sapon. Modern Language Aptitude Test: Manual 2002 Edition. Rockville, MD: Language Learning and Testing Foundation, 2002.
- Carroll, John B. and Stanley M. Sapon. Modern Language Aptitude Test – Elementary: Manual, 2002 Edition. Rockville, MD: Language Learning and Testing Foundation, 2002.
- Pimsleur, Paul, Daniel J. Reed and Charles W. Stansfield. Pimsleur Language Aptitude Battery: Manual, 2004 Edition. Bethesda, MD: Language Learning and Testing Foundation, 2004.
- Stansfield, Charles W. “Language Aptitude Reconsidered.” ERIC Digest. Washington DC: ERIC Clearinghouse on Languages and Linguistics, 1989.
- Turker, S., Seither-Preisler, A., & Reiterer, S. M. (2021). "Examining Individual Differences in Language Learning: A Neurocognitive Model of Language Aptitude"
- Huang, T., Loerts, H., & Steinkrauss, R. (2022). "The impact of second- and third-language learning on language aptitude and working memory"
- Pishghadam, R., Al Abdwani, T., Jajarmi, H., & Shayesteh, S. (2023). "Enhancing general and language aptitude tests by incorporating cultural and emo-sensory constructs"
