= Willingness to communicate =

Willingness to communicate (WTC) was originally conceptualised for first language acquisition, and seeks to demonstrate the probability that a speaker will choose to participate in a conversation of their own volition (McCroskey & Baer 1985, cited in MacIntyre et al., 1998). Traditionally, it was seen as a fixed personality trait that did not change according to context. However, McCroskey and associates suggested that it is in fact a situational variable that will change according to a number of factors (how well the speaker knows the interlocutor(s), number of interlocutors, formality, topic etc.).

== Difference between L1 and second language WTC ==
MacIntyre, Clément, Dörnyei & Noels (1998) noted that WTC in first language (L1) does not necessarily transfer to the second language. "It is highly unlikely that WTC in the second language (second language) is a simple manifestation of WTC in the L1" (p. 546).

According to MacIntyre, a key difference between WTC in L1 and L2 is that in L2, WTC is “a readiness to enter into discourse at a particular time with a specific person or persons, using a L2.” (1998, p. 547, italics added). That is, the speaker indicates they have intention to speak, for example raising their hand in a class, even if they don’t physically produce language at that time, because the conditions have been met for them to believe they have the ability to communicate.

Therefore, "the ultimate goal of the learning process should be to engender in language education students the willingness to communicate.”(MacIntyre, Clément, Dörnyei & Noels:1998).

== Pyramid model ==
A pyramid model has been established that describes the possible influences on a student’s willingness to communicate in a second language . “The pyramid shape shows the immediacy of some factors and the relatively distal influence of others.” (p. 546)

At the top of the pyramid is the point of communication, and moving down the pyramid, the influencing factors become less transient, situation specific and more long term, stable factors that can be applied to almost any situation.

As described by MacIntyre et al. 1998, the model has six layers and “is based on a host of learner variables that have been well established as influences on L2 learning and communication” (p. 558):

- communication behaviour (I)
- behavioural intention (II)
- situated antecedents (III)
- motivational propensities (IV)
- affective-cognitive context (V)
- social and individual context (VI)

Layers I-III represent transient, situation specific factors that will influence WTC dependent on the specific person, topic, context and time.

Layers IV-VI represent more stable, long-term traits of the speaker that will apply to almost all situations, irrespective of other factors.

Within each layer, there are a number of constructs which further explain the situational and enduring influences on WTC:

1. use (layer I)
2. willingness to communicate (II)
3. desire to communicate with a specific person (III)
4. state of communicating self-confidence (III)
5. interpersonal motivation (IV)
6. intergroup motivation (IV)
7. self-confidence (IV)
8. intergroup attitudes (V)
9. social situation (V)
10. competence (V)
11. intergroup climate (VI)
12. personality (VI)

This model “looks at WTC as the final step in preparing the language learner for communication, because it represents the probability that a learner will use the language in authentic interaction with another individual, given the opportunity.” (p. 558)

== Engendering WTC ==
According to the study conducted by Barjesteh et al. (2012), context- and receiver-type familiarity is essential for a learner to initiate communicating in the target language.

Cetinkaya (2005) and Mari (2011) found that the more familiar the communicators are, the more likely they are to communicate. In addition to this, according to Syeda Farzana Bukhari et al. (2015), students are hesitant to start a communication with an interlocutor who they haven’t seen speaking the target language. Based on these findings, it seems communicators should learn about each other, including each other’s level in the target language, before they start engaging in communication in that language.

The study of MacIntyre et al. (1998) found that students often avoid speaking in the public or in a large group. It is therefore important that students should be put into smaller groups, so that students may feel more confident to speak.

The more formal and the more people in the audience, the more anxious the speaker becomes, because he or she could be afraid of making mistakes and losing face in front of others (Syeda Farzana Bukhari et al., 2015).

== Willingness to communicate in various contexts ==
=== In China ===
In their article "A Chinese Conceptualisation of Willingness to Communicate in ESL", authors Wen and Clement attempt something of a cultural anthropology of Willingness to Communicate in Chinese students. They conclude that the reluctance to verbally engage is rooted in "two aspects governing interpersonal relations: an other-directed self and a submissive way of learning." (p. 19)

The "other-directed self" is based on the idea that Chinese culture, like many other Asian cultures, values the collective over the individual. This value is traced back to the founding values of Chinese culture:

only in the presence of the other, will the self be significant. For Confucius, the self did not exit [sic] as a single entity. It's existential reality is dialectically related to the family, the community, the nation and the world (Chai & Chai, 1965). Self is relational, and it is defined by the surrounding relations (Gao, 1998). In Chinese culture, the social and moral process of 'conducting oneself' is to be aware of one's relations with others. Chinese people can never separate themselves from obligation to others. (p. 20)

The value placed on relations to others defining the self relates closely to the concept of "face". Face is lost when one behaves badly in class. This has an inevitable effect on WtC, as "it seems likely that Chinese students would be even more sensitive to the judgment of the public upon their language behaviors and, therefore, lesses likely to get involved in classroom communication." Not incidentally, Wen and Clement identify a cultural trait that places value on resisting "outsider culture", which may result in additional difficulty in adapting to different norms of verbal participation (p. 21-22).

The second major factor detailed in this study is submission in learning:

The tendency of Chinese teachers to play an authoritative role and of Chinese students to submit to authority in the process of learning goes back to Confucianism and the teaching of Confucian Classics. In Imperial China, 'the whole process of learning and education was oriented to the mechanical memorisation of ideals of antiquity, principally the Four Books and Five Great Classics' (Pratt, 1992: 302) (p. 22).

To perhaps oversimplify, rigid adherence to infallible ancient teachings was believed to result in virtuous behavior and wisdom. Submission to canonical texts and to the teachers who had mastered them was then valued more than individuals' participation and questioning.

Submission in learning deeply shapes how Chinese students engage in the American ESL classroom. The teacher is seen as the source of all knowledge, so Chinese students will not value partner and small group work as highly. This also accounts of "the enthusiasm for grammar, the 'law' of the English language". Accuracy is valued much more than fluency. The resulting lack of fluency further diminishes students' willingness to communicate (p. 23).

=== In Japan ===
The Ministry of Education, Culture, Sports, Science and Technology (Japan) or MEXT, as Yashima (2002) noted, has, for a number of years, begun to place a greater emphasis on communication in the second language. Prior to this, English education in Japanese classrooms was, and still is for many, considered a knowledge-based subject, like mathematics and sciences. Grammar and vocabulary have been learnt to solve increasingly complex linguistic puzzles—entrance exams—which had significant consequences for the test takers, and because they are still used today, still do.

According to MEXT guidelines, however, the objectives for the study of foreign languages is to develop practical communication abilities, deepen the understanding of foreign cultures and foster positive attitudes toward communicating in a second language. Despite the stated goals and objectives in MEXT's guidelines, Fujita (2002) cautioned, however, that as yet there is no clear "consensus as to the purpose of learning English in Japan" (p. 19).

Yashima asked with whom and for what purposes Japanese will communicate in their second language. "For many learners, English symbolizes the world around Japan, something that connects them to foreign countries and foreigners ..., with whom they can communicate by using English" (p. 57). Yashima called this desire by Japanese to learn English to communicate with the world around them international posture: a general attitude towards the international community that "influences motivation [in learning a second language], which, in turn, predicts proficiency and second language communication confidence" (Yashima, 2002, p. 63).

International posture, along with second-language confidence in communication, was also seen as directly influencing WTC. While proficiency was seen as influencing confidence in second language communication, the path was not significant. In the Japanese context, this implies that students do have the abilities to perform in the second language, yet lack confidence in communicating in the second language.

Yashima (2002) concluded with a call that "EFL lessons should be designed to enhance students' interest in different cultures and international affairs and activities, as well as to reduce anxiety and build confidence in communication" (p. 63).

== See also ==
- Applied linguistics
- English language learning and teaching
- Language exchange
- Motivation in second-language learning
- Second-language acquisition
