= Language learning strategies =

Methods to achieve fluency in a target language

Language learning strategies is a term referring to the actions that are consciously deployed by language learners to help them learn or use a language more effectively. They have also been defined as "thoughts and actions, consciously chosen and operationalized by language learners, to assist them in carrying out a multiplicity of tasks from the very outset of learning to the most advanced levels of target language performance". Some learning strategies include methods that facilitate lowering the learner's language anxiety, therefore improving their confidence in using the language. Consistently it has been proven that strategies, those mentioned in the following article and others, assist learners to become more proficient. The term language learner strategies, which incorporates strategies used for language learning and language use, is sometimes used, although the line between the two is ill-defined as moments of second language use can also provide opportunities for learning.

== History ==
Language learning strategies were first introduced to the second language literature in 1975, with research on the good language learner. At the time it was thought that a better understanding of strategies deployed by successful learners could help inform teachers and students alike of how to teach and learn languages more effectively. Initial studies aimed to document the strategies of good language learners. In the 80s the emphasis moved to classification of language learning strategies. Strategies were first classified according to whether they were direct or indirect, and later they were strategies divided into cognitive, metacognitive or affective/social categories.

In 1990, Rebecca Oxford published her landmark book Language Learning Strategies: What Every Teacher Should Know which included the "Strategy Inventory for Language Learning" or "SILL" (Strategy Inventory for Language Learning), a questionnaire which was used in a great deal of research in the 1990s and early 2000s.

Controversy over basic issues such as definition grew stronger in the late 1990s and early 2000s, however, with some researchers giving up trying to define the concept in favour of listing essential characteristics. Others abandoned the strategy term in favour of "self regulation".

== Classification of language learning strategies ==
=== O'Malley and Chamot classification ===
In 1990, O'Malley and Chamot developed a classification of three types of language learning strategies:

- Metacognitive strategies, which involved thinking about (or knowledge of) the learning process, planning for learning, monitoring learning while it is taking place, or self-evaluation of learning after the task had been completed.
- Cognitive strategies, which involved mental manipulation or transformation of materials or tasks, intended to enhance comprehension, acquisition, or retention.
- Social/affective strategies, which consisted of using social interactions to assist in the comprehension, learning or retention of information. As well as the mental control over personal affect that interfered with learning.

This model was based on cognitive theory, which was commended, but it was also criticized for the ad hoc nature of its third category.

=== Oxford taxonomy ===
Also in 1990, Rebecca Oxford developed a taxonomy for categorizing strategies under six headings:

- Cognitive—making associations between new and already known information. This would include strategies that include the learner using reasoning or analysis of the grammar to find understanding.
- Mnemonic—making associations between new and already known information through use of formula, phrase, verse or the like;
- Metacognitive—controlling own cognition through the co-ordination of the planning, organization and evaluation of the learning process;
- Compensatory—using context to make up for missing information in reading and writing;
- Affective—regulation of emotions, motivation and attitude toward learning;
- Social—the interaction with other learners to improve language learning and cultural understanding. The purpose of this strategy is to help the students understand and cooperate with those that speak the language they are learning.

In later years this classification system was criticized for its problems in separating mnemonic strategies from cognitive strategies, when one is a sub-category of the other, and the inclusion of compensatory strategies, which are connected to how a learner uses the language, rather than learns it.

=== Recent research ===
More recent research has examined language learning strategies in more context-specific situations, rather than catch-all categories. That is, when learners study academic writing, for example, they are likely to deploy a different set of strategies than if they were to study daily conversation. The terms cognitive and meta-cognitive strategies remain common in strategy research, but others related to managing a learner's own affective state or social environment have been examined under the umbrella term self-regulation.

== Controversies ==
First, although originally promoted as a means of helping students to succeed in language learning, a synthesis of past research on language learning strategies has produced conflicting results regarding the relationship between strategies and language learning success. In fact, much of the research that emerged in the 1990s included numerous conflicting studies based on use of the SILL as a research instrument, of which very few met rigorous research criteria.

A second problem associated with researching language learning strategies is the definitional fuzziness of major concepts in the field. Researchers in the field, such as Ernesto Macaro, argue there is a lack of consensus of:

- Whether strategies occur inside or outside of the brain;
- Whether learner strategies consist of knowledge, intention, action or all three;
- Whether to classify strategies in frameworks, hierarchies [or clusters];
- Whether strategies survive across all learning situations, tasks and contexts;
- Whether they are integral or additive to language processing.

Due to the definitional fuzziness of language learning strategies, critics have argued the whole field should be replaced with the psychological concept of self-regulation. However, language learning strategy researchers have argued that replacing the field would be a matter of 'throwing the baby out with the bathwater' in that it throws away 30 years of research because of definitional issues. It has also been argued that self-regulation and language learning strategies are measuring different parts of the learning process, and thus can be used in tandem to observe a more accurate picture of how learners learn a second language.

Interest in the potential of strategies to promote learning remains strong, however, as evidenced from recent books on the topic, and a number of special issues of academic journals on the topic. A particularly important question for educators is whether learners can benefit from strategy instruction, both in terms of improved linguistic outcomes and improved self-efficacy for learning. For example, in a study within the context of England, Graham and Macaro (2008) found improved listening skills and improved self-efficacy for listening among learners of French who had received instruction in listening strategies. Another important question is also the extent to which teachers have knowledge and understanding of how to incorporate language learning strategies into their teaching, with research indicating that this is an area for development .

== Related concepts ==
Language learning strategies have naturally strong links to the fields of self-regulation, self-directed learning, and learner autonomy as they share core notions of independent learning, learner-centredness, and the necessity for learners to exercise responsibility for their own learning. These learning strategies also assist learners in areas outside of language learning, such as video gaming, strategy categorizing, and critical thinking.
