= Noticing hypothesis =

Theory of second-language acquisition

The noticing hypothesis is a theory within second-language acquisition that a learner cannot continue advancing their language abilities or grasp linguistic features unless they consciously notice the input. The theory was proposed by Richard Schmidt in 1990.

The noticing hypothesis explains the change from linguistic input into intake and is considered a form of conscious processing. It is exclusive from attention and understanding, and has been criticized within the field of psychology and second language acquisition. Schmidt and Frota studied noticing in Schmidt as a Portuguese language learner and collected their findings through diary study and audio recordings. The hypothesis was modified in 1994 in light of criticism.

== Overview ==
Schmidt posited that a learner cannot continue advancing their language abilities or grasp linguistic features unless they are consciously processing the input, and that what the learner actually notices is called "intake". This definition differs from that of Krashen's input hypothesis in which intake is similar to comprehensible input, and that of Chaudron which separates intake into preliminary intake and final intake. Therefore in order for the language someone is hearing to become salient and sent to long term memory where it can be used naturally, the learner must first actively be aware of aspects of language being presented to them.

Other terms that fall under the concept of conscious processing that was put forth by previous researchers include attention, short-term memory, control vs. automatic processing, and serial vs. parallel processing, but these topics were not unified under a single concept until Schmidt. Schmidt argued that noticing is not a replacement or a synonym for attention or any other term previously existing, but rather its own function in second language acquisition.

Susan Gass put forth a suggestion of a second noticing process. In this case, learners notice the gaps between their knowledge of the second language and that of what a native speaker would say.

"Noticing" differs from "understanding" in that the former refers to a finite moment where an aspect of language is understood and added to long term memory, rather than a general knowledge.

== Discovery ==
Schmidt's hypothesis stemmed from his own experiences within learning Portuguese in Brazil. In which he attended a five week course in the language, speaking to native speakers as supplement. Through working with Sylvia Frota and conducting monthly conversation recordings, they found that although explicit teaching of forms did not always become intake, linguistic features that he had been previously exposed to did not become apparent until they had been directly pointed out to him. Only after noticing something did Schmidt begin to use it. While noticing and the emergence of language appeared to be connected, Schmidt also noted that he repeated things that the other speaker said only in that conversation, but it did not become intake, nor did he use it in future conversations.

The noticing process was first tracked through journal entries and recordings in Schmidt and Frota's 1986 study, in which a linguistic form was noticed and used more than once but not written down. Due to inconsistencies of memory, the main support for the noticing hypothesis comes from controlled environments. According to Cherry (1953) and Kahneman and Treisman (1984) in an auditory shadowing study, subjects could concentrate on one auditory input but not two simultaneously. The input that was not focused on could only be recalled from the short-term memory if the input had stopped immediately before the task of recalling was asked. Therefore, Schmidt posits that input needs to be focused on explicitly to make it into the long-term memory.

== Amendments to the hypothesis ==
Four years after the original hypothesis was delivered, Schmidt updated it. He stated that noticing is helpful but is not required to learn different linguistic features of a language. He proposed that being able to notice more leads to more learning. However, it is not necessary for all learners to notice.

== Criticisms ==
The Noticing Hypothesis has been challenged for its strong claim that conscious attention to form is a prerequisite for acquisition, as some research suggests that repeated exposure to formulaic sequences without focal awareness can result in the retention of such sequences. The noticing hypothesis has received criticism from John Truscott, on two grounds. First, he argued that the basis for the noticing hypothesis in cognitive psychology is unclear. Second, he argued that there is even less certainty over how to interpret the noticing hypothesis in the field of language acquisition. Because Schmidt's hypothesis does not specifically target the grammar of natural language, the noticing hypothesis is too vague. Truscott argues that the noticing hypothesis should be limited to describing metalinguistic knowledge and not overall language competence.

Tomlin and Villa (1994) argued that the use of diary studies was not an appropriate choice of material for this research as the actual instance of noticing is a short time frame compared to what the diary can encompass, but overall agreed with the idea that attention must exist for learning to take place. Meanwhile, Gass (1997) proposed that not all learning requires input, and Schlachter states that certain aspects of language do not require noticing while others do. Caroll (2006) argued that input in the environment does not contain the information needed to acquire a language and therefore invalidates the noticing hypothesis.

Nick Ellis also found that Schmidt's hypothesis misconstrued the processes of implicit learning. Ellis stated that noticing occurs only with new linguistic features that the learner encounters which they may find to be difficult.

There is debate over whether learners must consciously notice something, or whether the noticing can be subconscious to some degree.

== Areas of further research ==
There exists little research regarding concepts such as cognitive style, depth of processing, self-regulation, and executive attention in the scope of the noticing hypothesis.
