= Bilingualism: Language and Cognition =

- Discipline: Linguistics
- Language: English
- Edited by: Jubin Abutalebi, Harald Clahsen.

Publication details
- History: 1998–present
- Publisher: Cambridge University Press
- Frequency: Quarterly
- Impact factor: 2.707 (2017)

Standard abbreviations
- ISO 4: Biling.: Lang. Cogn.
- NLM: Biling (Camb Engl)

Indexing
- ISSN: 1366-7289 (print); 1469-1841 (web)
- OCLC no.: 44166470

Links
- Journal homepage; Online access; Online archive

Bilingualism: Language and Cognition is a quarterly peer-reviewed academic journal of linguistics focusing on the study of multilingualism, including bilingual language competence, perception and production, bilingual language acquisition in children and adults, neurolinguistics of bilingualism (in normal and brain-damaged populations), and non-linguistic cognitive processes in bilinguals. The journal is published by Cambridge University Press and was co-established by François Grosjean in 1998.

== Abstracting and indexing ==
The journal is abstracted and indexed in:

- Linguistics and Language Behavior Abstracts
- Scopus
- EBSCOhost
- MLA International Bibliography
- Social Sciences Citation Index
- E-psyche

According to the Journal Citation Reports, the journal has a 2017 impact factor of 2.707, ranking it 7th out of 181 journals in the category "Linguistics" and 22nd out of 85 journals in the category "Experimental Psychology".

== See also ==
- List of applied linguistics journals
