= Defense Language Aptitude Battery =

Test used by the US DoD for language-learning potential

The Defense Language Aptitude Battery (DLAB) is a test used by the United States Department of Defense to test an individual's potential for learning a foreign language and thus determine who may pursue training as a military linguist. It consists of 126 multiple-choice questions, and the test is scored out of a possible 164 points. The test is composed of five audio sections and one visual section. As of 2009, the test is completely web-based. The test does not attempt to gauge a person's fluency in a given language but rather to determine their ability to learn a language. The test will give the service member examples of what a selection of words or a portion of a word means, then ask the test taker to create a specific word from the samples given.

Preparation for the DLAB includes a number of study guides and practice tests. These resources give one the appropriate means by which to prepare for the test and gauge a possible outcome. However, a study guide for the DLAB is not like traditional studying - one will not learn content that will be on the DLAB, but rather the style of the DLAB. Someone who fails the test or gets a low score can always retake the DLAB, but only after a wait of 6 months. For most service members, this is too long and will cause them to miss the deadline for submitting their scores. Adequate preparation is thus a near-necessity.

The languages are broken into tiers based on their difficulty level for a native English speaker as determined by the Defense Language Institute. The category into which a language is placed also determines the length of its basic course as taught at DLI.

To qualify to pursue training in a language, one needs a minimum score of 95. The Marines will waive it to 90 for Cat I and Cat II languages, and the Navy will waive it to 85 for Cat I languages, 90 for Cat II languages, and 95 for Cat III languages. The Air Force does not currently offer a waiver and requires all applicants to qualify for Cat IV languages, requiring a 110 or better. The Army National Guard is able to waive a score of 90 into a Cat. IV language.

The DLAB is typically administered to new and prospective recruits at the United States Military Entrance Processing Command sometime after the Armed Services Vocational Aptitude Battery (ASVAB) is taken but before a final job category (NEC, MOS, AFSC) is determined. Individuals may usually take the DLAB if they score high enough on the ASVAB for linguist training and are interested in doing so. The DLAB is also administered to ROTC cadets while they still attend college. The DLAB was also used for the Australian Defence Force from 1998 to 2013.

The DLAB is a required test for officers looking to either join the Foreign Area Officer program or the Olmsted Scholar Program. The required grade for these programs is 105, but the recommended grade is at least 122 or above.

Military personnel interested in retraining into a linguist field typically also must pass the DLAB. In a few select cases, the DLAB requirement may be waived if proficiency in a foreign language is already demonstrated via the DLPT.

== Language categories ==
- Category I language: 95 or higher (Dutch, French, Italian, Norwegian, Portuguese, Spanish)
- Category II language: 100 or higher (German, Indonesian, Malay, Romanian)
- Category III language: 105 or higher (Hebrew, Hindi, Kurdish [Kurmanji, Sorani], Persian [Dari, Iranian], Punjabi, Russian, Serbo-Croatian, Tagalog, Thai, Turkish, Urdu, Uzbek)
- Category IV language: 110 or higher (Arabic [Modern Standard, Iraqi, Levantine, Egyptian], Chinese [Mandarin], Japanese, Korean, Pashto)

While these scores are required to enter a language program of that category, often placement is based upon need rather than score. For example, a service member who receives a score of 115 (good enough for Category IV) may be placed in Russian (Category III). Previously, the maximum score on the DLAB was 176, but as of 2016 has been lowered to 164.

As of 2010, Category I languages had 26 weeks of study, Cat II had 35 weeks, Cat III had 48 weeks, and Cat IV had 64 weeks. By 2022, Cat I and II had 36 weeks of courses, Cat III had 48 weeks, and Cat IV had 64 weeks.

== See also ==
- Defense Language Proficiency Tests
- Defense Language Institute
- Defense Language Office
- Language-learning aptitude
