= Paul Pimsleur =

American linguist (1927–1979)

- Born: October 17, 1927; New York City, U.S.
- Died: June 22, 1976 (aged 48); Paris, France
- Education: City College of New York (BA); Columbia University (MS, PhD)
- Occupations: Professor; linguist; educator
- Known for: Pimsleur Language Aptitude Battery; Pimsleur Language Programs
- Spouse(s): Beverly Fleishman, married 1962-1972
- Children: Marc-Andrew (born 1966), Julia Pimsleur (born 1968)

Paul Pimsleur (October 17, 1927 – June 22, 1976) was a French-American linguist and scholar in the field of applied linguistics. He developed the Pimsleur language learning system, which, along with his many publications, had a significant effect upon theories of language learning and teaching. He was the founder of Pimsleur Language Programs.

== Early life and education ==
Paul M. Pimsleur was born in New York City and grew up in The Bronx. His father, Solomon Pimsleur, was a Jewish immigrant from France and a composer of music; his American-born mother, Miera, was a librarian at Columbia University. Pimsleur earned a bachelor's degree at the City College of New York, and from Columbia University he earned a master's degree in psychological statistics and a PhD in French.

== Career ==
His first position involved teaching French phonetics and phonemics at the University of California, Los Angeles. After leaving UCLA, Pimsleur went on to faculty positions at the Ohio State University, where he taught French and foreign language education. At the time, the foreign language education program at OSU was the major doctoral program in that field in the U.S. While at Ohio State he created and directed the Listening Center, one of the largest language laboratories in the United States. The center was developed in conjunction with Ohio Bell Telephone and allowed self-paced language study using a series of automated tapes and prompts that were delivered over the telephone.

Later, Pimsleur was a professor of education and Romance languages at The State University of New York at Albany, where he held dual professorships in education and French. He was a Fulbright lecturer at the Ruprecht Karls University of Heidelberg in 1968 and 1969 and a founding member of the American Council on the Teaching of Foreign Languages (ACTFL). He did research on the psychology of language learning and in 1969 was section head of psychology of second languages learning at the International Congress of Applied Linguistics.

His research focused on understanding the language acquisition process, especially the learning process of children, who speak a language without knowing its formal structure. The term "organic learning" was applied to that phenomenon. For this, he studied the learning process of groups made of children, adults, and multilingual adults. The result of this research was the Pimsleur Language Programs. His many books and articles affected theories of language learning and teaching.

In the period from 1958 to 1966, Pimsleur reviewed previously published studies regarding linguistic and psychological factors involved in language learning. He also conducted several studies with support from Ohio State or from the US Office of Education. This led to the publication in 1963 of a coauthored monograph, Underachievement in Foreign Language Learning, which was published in the International Review of Applied Linguistics.

Through this research, he identified three factors that could be used to calculate language learning aptitude: verbal intelligence, auditory ability, and motivation. Pimsleur was the primary author of the Pimsleur Language Aptitude Battery (PLAB) based on these three factors to assess language aptitude. He concluded that low auditory ability was a major factor in underachievement. Pimsleur was one of the first foreign language educators to show an interest in students who have difficulty in learning a foreign language while doing well in other subjects. Today, the PLAB is used to determine foreign language-learning aptitude, or even a foreign language-learning disability, among secondary-school students.

== Death ==
Pimsleur died unexpectedly of a heart attack during a visit to France in 1976.

== Legacy ==
Since its creation in 1977, The ACTFL-MLJ Paul Pimsleur Award for Research in Foreign Language Education, which is awarded annually, bears his name.

Pimsleur's business partner, Charles Heinle, continued to develop the Pimsleur courses until he sold the company to Simon & Schuster Audio in 1997.

== Selected works ==
- Pimsleur, Paul; Quinn, Terence (editors). The psychology of second language learning: papers from the Second International Congress of Applied Linguistics, Cambridge, 8–12 September 1969. London, Cambridge University Press, 1971. ISBN 0521082366
- Poems make pictures; pictures make poems. Poems by Giose Rimanelli and Paul Pimsleur. New York : Pantheon Books. 1972. ISBN 0394923871
- Pimsleur, Paul. Encounters; a basic reader. [simplified by] Paul Pimsleur [and] Donald Berger. New York, Harcourt Brace Jovanovich. 1974. OCLC 947550
- Pimsleur, Paul. How to learn a foreign language. Boston, Mass. : Heinle & Heinle Publishers, 1980.
