= Modern Language Aptitude Test =

Language aptitude test

The Modern Language Aptitude Test (MLAT) was designed to predict a student's likelihood of success and ease in learning a foreign language. It is published by the Language Learning and Testing Foundation.

The Modern Language Aptitude Test was developed to measure foreign language learning aptitude. Language learning aptitude does not refer to whether or not an individual can or cannot learn a foreign language (it is assumed that virtually everyone can learn a foreign language given adequate opportunity). According to John Carroll and Stanley Sapon, the authors of the MLAT, language learning aptitude refers to the "prediction of how well, relative to other individuals, an individual can learn a foreign language in a given amount of time and under given conditions". The MLAT has primarily been used for adults in government language programs and missionaries, but it is also appropriate for students in grades 9 to 12 as well as college/university students so it is also used by private schools and school and clinical psychologists. Similar tests have been created for younger age groups. For example, the Pimsleur Language Aptitude Battery was designed for junior high and high school students while the MLAT-E is for children in grades 3 through 6.

== Development ==
John B. Carroll and Stanley Sapon are responsible for the development of the MLAT. They designed the test as part of a five-year research study at Harvard University between 1953 and 1958. One initial purpose of developing the Modern Language Aptitude Test was to help the US Government find and train people who would be successful learners of a foreign language in an intensive program of instruction.

After field testing many different kinds of verbal tasks, Carroll chose five tasks that he felt worked well as a combination in predicting foreign language learning success in a variety of contexts. These tasks were minimally correlated with one another, but used together they demonstrated high predictive validity with respect to such criteria as language proficiency ratings and grades in foreign language classes.

The design of the MLAT also reflects a major conclusion of Carroll's research, which was that language learning aptitude was not a "general" unitary ability, but rather a composite of at least four relatively independent "specialized" abilities. The four aspects, or "components", of language learning aptitude that Carroll identified were phonetic coding ability, grammatical sensitivity, rote learning ability and inductive language learning ability. In the article "The prediction of success in intensive foreign language training", Carroll defined these components as follows:

Ability	Definition
Phonetic coding ability	an ability to identify distinct sounds, to form associations between those sounds and symbols representing them, and to retain these associations;
Grammatical sensitivity	the ability to recognize the grammatical functions of words (or other linguistic entities) in sentence structures;
Rote learning ability for foreign language materials	the ability to learn associations between sounds and meanings rapidly and efficiently, and to retain these associations; and
Inductive language learning ability	the ability to infer or induce the rules governing a set of language materials, given samples of language materials that permit such inferences.

The data used to calculate the statistical norms for the MLAT were collected in 1958. The MLAT was administered to approximately nineteen hundred students in grades nine to twelve and thirteen hundred students from ten colleges and universities. For adult norms, the MLAT was administered to about one thousand military and civilian employees of the government. The test was given to the subjects before starting a language course in a school or university or an intensive training program of the US Government. Their performance in the language program was later compared to their score on the MLAT to determine the predictive validity of the test.

== Sections ==
The MLAT consists of five sections, each one testing separate abilities.

Number Learning
This section is designed in part to measure the subject's memory as well as an "auditory alertness" factor which would affect the subject's auditory comprehension of a foreign language.

Phonetic Script
This section is designed to measure the subject's sound-symbol association ability, which is the ability to learn correlations between a speech sound and written symbols.

Spelling Clues/Hidden Words
This highly speeded section is designed to test the subject's vocabulary knowledge of English as well as their sound-symbol association ability.

Words in Sentences
This section is designed to measure the subject's sensitivity to grammatical structure without using any grammatical terminology.

Paired Associates
This section is designed to measure the subject's rote memorization ability, which is a typical component of foreign language learning.

== Uses ==
The uses for the Modern Language Aptitude Test include selection, placement and diagnosis of learning abilities.

Selection
The MLAT can be used to select individuals who show promise in learning foreign languages in order to justify the time and expense of placing them in a language training program.

Placement
In situations where there is more than one class or group of students in a language training program or course, the students can be placed according to their language learning aptitude so that each class can work at the most beneficial pace.

Diagnosis of Learning Abilities
The MLAT can also be used in conjunction with other forms of evidence to diagnose a foreign language learning disability.
Looking at an individual's score on the different parts of the test can be help to match students' learning styles with instructional approaches.

Security
Because the MLAT is sometimes used for high stakes purposes, test security is tight. As a result, in recent years some researchers have used the LLAMA Tests, which attempt to test the same abilities, but use item types quite different from those used on the MLAT.

== Modern Language Aptitude Test – Elementary ==
In 1967, Carroll and Sapon authored the Modern Language Aptitude Test – Elementary (EMLAT; more recently, MLAT-E). This was an adaptation of the adult version of the MLAT intended for younger students (grades 3 through 6). The MLAT-E is broken down into four parts, three of which are modified versions of the MLAT's Part 3 – Hidden Words, Part 4 – Words in Sentences and Part 1 – Number Learning. It also includes a new section called Finding Rhymes, which tests the subject's ability to hear speech sounds.

Carroll and Sapon suggest using the MLAT-E in ways similar to the MLAT. It can be used to select students who have the capability to excel in foreign language learning (and may be ready to start instruction earlier), provide a profile of strengths and weaknesses, place students with similar learning rates in the appropriate class, and start to build a history of language learning difficulty, which could be used in conjunction with other evidence to diagnose a foreign language learning disability.

The MLAT-E has been used in several studies of language learning in children. These include Tellier & Roehr-Brackin (2013) and Roehr-Brackin & Tellier (2019). It is used in some private schools in the United Kingdom, the US, and Canada. The MLAT-E has been adapted into Spanish (2005), Catalan (2010), Hungarian (2005) German (1967), Korean (2004), and Slovenian (2014), although only the Spanish version, the MLAT-ES, is commercially available.

== Issues of debate ==
One issue taken with the MLAT is that it does not include any measure of motivation. Motivation can be a powerful factor; low motivation may cause poor performance in a language course or training program despite a high score on an aptitude test like the MLAT. Alternatively, a relatively low score on an aptitude test combined with high motivation to learn a language may result in average or even above average performance because of a student putting more time and effort into the language program. Accordingly, proper use of the MLAT would be to use it as one part of a more comprehensive assessment of the learner, or to use the test in a setting where motivation is known to be uniformly high. In response to role of motivation in successful learning, Paul Pimsleur developed the Pimsleur Language Aptitude Battery (PLAB), which includes a section that assesses motivation in examinees.

Another issue taken with using language aptitude tests like the MLAT is that they are not directly helpful to individuals who are required to learn a language regardless of their language learning abilities. According to John Carroll, language learning aptitude is relatively stable over an individual's lifetime, so if an individual scores poorly on the MLAT, there is no proven method to increase their language learning aptitude if they must learn a language. One way the MLAT could be helpful in this situation is as an indicator that more language learning time will be needed relative to someone who received a higher score on the MLAT. It can also assist them by showing which learning strategies that they use best. Similarly, level of difficulty of the language can be considered when selecting those wish to learn a foreign language, i.e. the more difficult the language the greater the need for higher language learning aptitude.

The age of the test along with its norms is another area of concern. The test was developed in 1953-58 and the norms were calculated with data collected in 1958.

The validity of the MLAT has also been challenged due to changes in teaching methods since the 1950s. The grammar translation method was likely used with norming subjects in high schools and universities, while government employees and soldiers in intensive language programs focused on oral language skills. Thus, learners included in the validation represented two quite different methods of instruction. The grammar translation method used in high schools and universities has been replaced by more communicative teaching methods. In 1998, research conducted by Madeline Ehrman, Director of Research and Evaluation at the U.S. Foreign Service Institute, where adult government employees are enrolled in a communication oriented intensive language program, produced validity coefficients at approximately the same levels as the original validity coefficients from 1958. This supports the validity of the test as a predictor of success under communicative language teaching. Also, research by Leila Ranta (Associate Professor of Educational Psychology at University of Alberta) as well as Harley and Hart (with the Ontario Institute for Studies in Education of the University of Toronto) has shown an association between good language analytic ability and good language learners in a communicative learning environment (2002).

== Resources ==
- Carroll, John B. and Stanley Sapon. Modern Language Aptitude Test: Manual 2002 Edition. Bethesda, MD: Language Learning and Testing Foundation, Inc., 2002.
- Carroll, John B. and Stanley M. Sapon. Modern Language Aptitude Test – Elementary: Manual, 2002 Edition. Rockville, MD: Language Learning and Testing Foundation, Inc., 2002.
- Ehrman, M. "A Study of the Modern Language Aptitude Test for predicting learning success and advising students." Applied Language Learning, Vol. 9, pp. 31-70.
- Harley, B. & D. Hart. "Language Aptitude and Second Language Proficiency in Classroom Learners of Different Starting Ages." Studies in Second Language Acquisition, 19 (1997): 379-400.
- Harley, B. & D. Hart. "Age, Aptitude and Second Language Learning on a Bilingual Exchange." Individual Differences and Instructed Language Learning. Ed. P. Robinson, Amsterdam/Philadelphia: John Benjamins, 2002. 301-330.
- "Modern Language Aptitude Test." Language Learning and Testing Foundation. 2000-2001. 27 June, 2006 LLTF.net.
- Ranta, L. "The Role of Learners' Analytic Abilities in the Communicative Classroom." Individual Differences and Instructed Language Learning. Ed. P. Robinson, Amsterdam/Philadelphia: John Benjamins, 2002. 159-180.
- Stansfield, Charles W. & Daniel J. Reed. "The Story Behind the Modern Language Aptitude Test: An Interview With John B. Carroll (1916-2003)." Language Assessment Quarterly 1.1 (2004): 43-56.
- Stansfield, Charles W. & Daniel J. Reed. Modern Language Aptitude Test – Elementary: Spanish Version: Manual 2005 Edition. Rockville, MD: Language Learning and Testing Foundation, 2005.
- Stansfield, Charles W. "Carroll, John Bissell." Concise Encyclopedia of Educational Linguistics. Ed. B. Spolsky. Amsterdam; New York: Elsevier, 1999.
- Suárez, M.M. "Language aptitude in young learners: The Elementary Modern Language Aptitude Test in Spanish and Catalan." PhD dissertation, University of Maryland, 2010. Available at: https://www.tesisenred.net/handle/10803/38244#page=1
- Tellier, A. & Roehr-Brackin, K., "The development of language learning aptitude and metalinguistic awareness in primary-school children: A classroom study." Essex Research Reports in Linguistics, (2013): 62(1), 1-28
- Tellier, A.J. "Metalinguistic awareness and foreign language learning in primary school: A classroom study with children aged 8 to 9 years." Unpublished PhD thesis, University of Essex, Dept. of Languages and Linguistics. (2015).
