= Pimsleur Language Aptitude Battery =

Language learning aptitude tests

The Pimsleur Language Aptitude Battery (PLAB) was developed to predict student success in foreign language learning, or language learning aptitude, and for diagnosing language learning disabilities. It is published by the Language Learning and Testing Foundation.

The Pimsleur Language Aptitude Battery (PLAB) measures language learning aptitude. Language learning aptitude does not refer to whether or not an individual can or cannot learn a foreign language (it is assumed that virtually everyone can learn a foreign language given an unlimited amount of time). According to John Carroll and Stanley Sapon, the authors of the Modern Language Aptitude Test (a similar language aptitude test intended for older learners), language learning aptitude refers to the "prediction of how well, relative to other individuals, an individual can learn a foreign language in a given amount of time and under given conditions". The PLAB is intended for use with native English speaking students in grades 7 through 12, although it is sometimes used with students as old as 20 years.

== Development ==
The Pimsleur Language Aptitude Battery was developed by Dr. Paul Pimsleur, also known for the Pimsleur language learning system. The PLAB is the culmination of eight years of research by Pimsleur and his associates from 1958 to 1966, which involved the review of 30 years of published studies regarding a variety of linguistic and psychological factors involved in language learning. Pimsleur and his colleagues grouped these studies into seven research topics: intelligence, verbal ability, pitch discrimination, order of language study and bilingualism, study habits, motivation and attitudes, and personality factors. Of the seven, motivation and verbal intelligence were the clearest factors contributing to success at learning a foreign language.

Subsequent research involving students learning French at the college level, taking several different tests and subjecting the resulting data to factor analysis and multiple correlation analysis also showed motivation and verbal intelligence to be primary factors in language learning success. After field testing a preliminary version of the Aptitude Battery on secondary school students of French and Spanish, Pimsleur and his associates identified verbal intelligence, motivation and auditory ability as the three most significant factors in predicting success at learning a foreign language. They developed seven subtests that would measure these three factors.

After testing the seven subtests, with the support of the Ohio State University Research Foundation, the PLAB was finalized by adding a part where the examinee indicates his or her grade point average in four core subjects. Thus, Pimsleur used GPA as a measure of study habits, which can be very important in foreign language learning, and a good predictor of success. Thus, the four final factors contributing to language learning aptitude measured on the PLAB are verbal ability, auditory ability, motivation and study habits.

1965–66, a study was conducted to calculate the predictive validity of the PLAB. Forty-one schools in thirteen different states participated in the study, which administered the PLAB to students in grades 7, 8, and 9 at the beginning of the school year. The students' final grades in a beginning language course were used to calculate the validity of the PLAB and provide statistical norms and expectancy tables.

== Sections ==
The final version of the PLAB contains six parts (Pimsleur, et al. 2004), each one testing different aspects of the four predictive factors (verbal ability, auditory ability, motivation and grade point average):

- Part 1 – Grade Point Average – calculates the student's grade point average in areas other than language learning
- Part 2 – Interest – measures the student's interest in learning a foreign language and is a measure of motivation
- Part 3 – Vocabulary – tests word knowledge in English and is a measure of verbal ability
- Part 4 – Language Analysis – tests the student's ability to reason logically in terms of a foreign language and is another aspect of verbal ability
- Part 5 – Sound Discrimination – tests the ability to learn new phonetic distinctions and to recognize them in different contexts and is a measure of auditory ability
- Part 6 – Sound–Symbol Association – tests the ability to associate sounds with written symbols and is another measure of auditory ability

Parts 1 and 2 are not aptitude measures. Part 1 is a measure of study habits and Part 2 is measure of motivation. Both study habits and motivation correlate with success in foreign language study. Depending on the teacher's motive in testing language aptitude, these parts could be deleted, or they could be translated to the student's native language. Therefore, the PLAB could be used with students whose mother tongue is not English but whose proficiency in English is high enough to take the test.

Part 3 is a short test of student's vocabulary in English. The grade level of the vocabulary is approximately grade 9-12. This part exists because breadth of native language vocabulary is related to success in learning a FL. This part could be either translated or not included for students who have limited proficiency in English.

Part 4, language analysis, is a test of the aptitude for learning the grammar of a foreign language. If needed, it could be translated to the student's native language. Otherwise, the English required to understand handle these items is not at a high level.

Part 5 is a sound discrimination test involving a tonal language. No translation is needed. One only has to understand the instructions. English proficiency plays no role in the score on this part.

Part 6 is a sound–symbol association test using nonsense words created from English sounds. Since these are nonsense words, English proficiency is not involved. This part is a test of phonetic coding ability as described by Carroll.

In summary, only part 3 requires a substantial level of English. Parts 1, 2, and 4 could be translated or adapted to the students native language for students with no or a low level of English proficiency. Part 4 for requires an Intermediate level of English proficiency. Parts 5 and 6 test auditory abilities but do not require English proficiency, beyond the comprehension of the directions to each part.

Earlier versions of the PLAB also included a twenty question test measuring a student's motivation for learning a foreign language and a section on rhyming, which was another measure of auditory ability. After field testing with the Ohio State University Research Foundation, Pimsleur and his associates found that these sections could be taken out of the test without affecting the predictive ability of the PLAB.

In a discussion of the MLAT and PLAB, Wesche (1981) noted that PLAB part 4 is a measure of inductive learning of foreign language grammar, while the MLAT (mentioned above) does not include a direct measure of inductive learning. She further notes that PLAB part 5 also measures the inductive learning of foreign language tones in different contexts. She states that low PLAB scores on parts 5 and 6 are often reflective of hearing problems and that PLAB Part 6 (Sound–Symbol Association) measures the phonetic coding ability described by Carroll in his description of the components of foreign language aptitude.

== Uses ==
The uses of the Pimsleur Language Aptitude Battery include program placement, program assessment and planning, and diagnosis of learning abilities and diagnosis of a foreign language learning disability. Current users include private and public secondary schools and learning disabilities specialists. The test is also used in research on foreign language teaching or learning, when a measure of language aptitude is needed as part of the research design. One advantage that the PLAB offers to researchers on second language learning is its availability to them.

=== Program placement ===
The PLAB can be used to assess which students may be cognitively ready to study a foreign language in grades 7 and 8 and those students who would benefit from waiting until a later grade to begin foreign language study. It can also be used to place students in the classroom that teaches at the most appropriate pace for them when there is more than one language class.

=== Program assessment and planning ===
The PLAB can be used to calculate local language aptitude norms. Using this information, schools or districts can assess the effectiveness of their current foreign language programs and use the PLAB to develop their language program. For example, a school may divide their language program into three zones, each using an appropriate textbook and moving at an appropriate pace.

=== Diagnosis of learning abilities ===
Pimsleur says that a language aptitude test may be used to identify the underachiever before the course starts. He defines underachievers as students who have significantly less success in language study than in their other courses. Pimsleur gave students in his study a sound–symbol test and a Chinese pitch test. In the sound–symbol association test the student hears a nonsense syllable and must match it with its correct spelling in the test booklet. The Chinese pitch test was a 30-item test of auditory discrimination in which the student must distinguish Chinese tones. Pimsleur found that among students with similar overall GPAs, those with lower scores in these two tests received lower grades in foreign languages. From this finding, Pimsleur concluded that the auditory component of language aptitude is the main factor that accounts for differences in language learning ability that are not explained by general intelligence, interest in learning a foreign language or general study habits. The PLAB can be used to identify students with a language learning disability when used in conjunction with other forms of evidence. He also stated that looking at the individual's score on the different parts of the test can be of help in matching students' learning preferences with instructional techniques.

== Issues of debate ==
While language learning aptitude is relatively stable among adults, among adolescents it continues to grow as the child reaches adulthood. Thus, scores should be compared to age/grade norms in the test manual or to locally developed norms. It has been said that language aptitude tests like the PLAB are not directly helpful to individuals who are required to learn a language regardless of their language learning abilities. However, language aptitude tests can be helpful as an indicator of the amount of time that will be needed to learn the language relative to others with higher or lower scores. The PLAB can also assist teachers by identifying the learning modalities through which the student may best be able to learn a foreign language.

Another point to take into account is the fact that the PLAB results could depend on the degree of English proficiency required by test tasks and items. Thus, language teachers who might want to use the PLAB should be aware that the students PLAB score could be influenced by their degree of English proficiency. Although only part 3 is a measure of native English skills, the other parts do assume some English skills on the part of the examinee. Consequently, teachers of foreign languages who want to use the PLAB to get a better understanding of the language aptitude profile of their students should also consider the English proficiency of each student when interpreting test scores. Teachers may also need to translate the directions and some items, so that the test remains essentially a measure of language aptitude, not English language proficiency. For students with advanced English proficiency, no translation would be necessary and the level of English required by each part could be considered simultaneously along with the student's proficiency in interpreting the scores.

== Resources ==
- Carroll, John B. and Stanley Sapon. Modern Language Aptitude Test: Manual 2010 Edition. Rockville, MD: Language Learning and Testing Foundation, 2010.
- Pimsleur, Paul, Daniel J. Reed and Charles W. Stansfield. Pimsleur Language Aptitude Battery: Manual 2004 Edition. Rockville, MD: Language Learning and Testing Foundation, 2004.
