= Kata Csizér =

Hungarian linguist

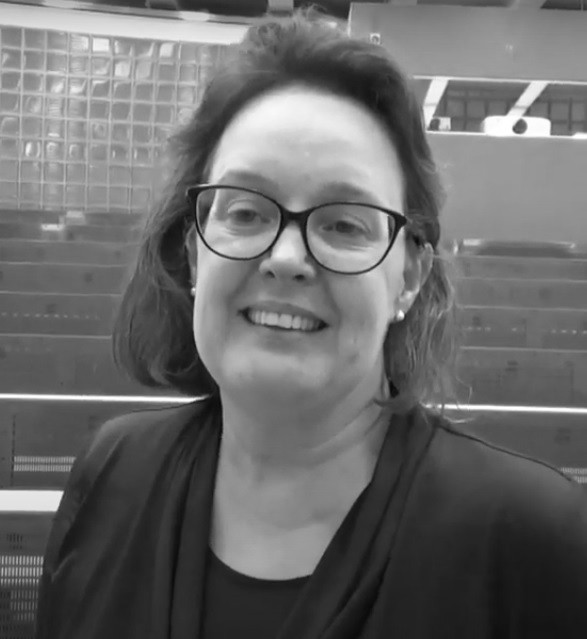
- Csizér at the University of Graz
- Born: Katalin Csizér; 17 November 1971 (age 54); Budapest, Hungary
- Known for: Motivation in second-language learning

Academic background
- Education: Eötvös Loránd University
- Thesis: Language learning motivation of Hungarian school children in the 1990's (2003)
- Academic advisor: Zoltán Dörnyei

Academic work
- Discipline: Linguist
- Sub-discipline: Psycholinguistics; Motivation in second-language learning
- Institutions: Eötvös Loránd University; University of Szeged; Eszterházy Károly University; International Business School
- Website: Csizér on the website of Eötvös Loránd University

Kata Csizér (17. November 1971) is a Hungarian linguist. She is currently a professor at the School of English and American Studies of the Faculty of Humanities of the Eötvös Loránd University, Hungary. Her research focuses on applied linguistics with a special focus on motivation in second-language learning and teaching students with special needs.

Csizér is considered an authority along with Zoltán Dörnyei because of her work on motivation in second-language learning. She is the author along with Zoltán Dörnyei and Nóra Németh, of three seminal articles (reaching more than 1,000 citations in the field of second language learning) on motivation in second language learning. Apart from motivation in second language learning, she is also noted for her work on the inclusion of deaf learners into the foreign language classroom.

== Career ==
In 2000, one of her first publications was on history in which she investigated the change of the regime on the three Visegrád Group countries namely, Poland, Czech Republic, Slovakia, and Hungary.

In 2009 her work on motivation in second language learning was published on the website of the Institute of Research on Education (in Hungarian: Oktatáskutató és Fejlesztő Intézet).

Csizér obtained her PhD degree at the Eötvös Loránd University in 2004 and has been employed at the Department of English Applied Linguistics of the School of English and American Studies at the Eötvös Loránd University in Budapest since.

In 2012 she obtained a Habilitation degree at the Eötvös Loránd University.

Since 2011, she has been an active member of the International Association of Teachers of English as a Foreign Language (IATEFL) Hungary, presenting at the organisation's conferences annually.

On 29 August 2014, she was a plenary speaker along with Diane Larsen-Freeman, Marjolijn Verspoor, Kees de Bot, Judit Kormos and Rosa Manchón at the International Conference on Motivational Dynamics and Second Language Acquisition, organized by Zoltán Dörnyei at the University of Nottingham.

Csizér has been the associate editor of the Journal of Second Language Writing.

In 2018, she was invited keynote speaker at Faculty of Arty and Social Sciences of the National University of Singapore along with Phil Benson, Kimberly Noels and Xiaohong Wen.

On 28 May 2019, she was a guest lecturer at the University of Graz, invited by Sarah Mercer.

In 2019, she was a keynote speaker at the British Association for Applied Linguistics Special Interest Group conference at the University of Bath, Bath, Somerset, United Kingdom. She presented on the English language teachers’ motivation in Hungary: The results of a mixed-methods study.

On 4 June 2019, she was a plenary speaker at the DTU CALIDIE Lectures in Multilingualism and Learning at the University of Luxembourg.

In 2021, she was an invited speaker at the METU ELT Convention at the Middle East Technical University in Ankara, Turkey.

In 2021, she was a plenary speaker, along with Tammy Gregersen, Phil Hiver, and Sue Roffey at the Language Teacher Psychology conference at the University of Graz, Graz, Austria.

== Research ==
=== Motivation ===
Csizér wrote three articles which are considered seminal articles (more than 1000 citations in the field of second language learning) on motivation in second language learning. One of them is, co-authored with Zoltán Dörnyei, entitled Ten commandments for motivating language learners: results of an empirical study, published in Language Teaching Research in 1998. In this study, the authors conducted a survey to obtain classroom data on motivational strategies. 200 Hungarian teachers of English completed the questionnaire on how important they consider a selection of 51 strategies and how often they use them in their classes. Based on the survey, the authors compiled a brief set of ten motivational macrostrategies, which they called 'Ten commandments for motivating language learners'.

The second most cited work by Csizér is entitled The Internal Structure of Language Learning Motivation and Its Relationship with Language Choice and Learning Effort, published in The Modern Language Journal. The co-author of this article, published in 2005, is Zoltán Dörnyei. The authors argued that language learning motivation is a complex construct. They evaluated a proposed theoretical model concerning the internal structure of the second language motivation complex and its effects on motivated behaviour by using structural equation modelling. The main results of their study was that integrativeness might be the single most important factor, subsuming the effects of all the other responses to questions asked.

Csizér's third most cited work is entitled Motivation, language attitudes and globalisation, published by Multilingual Matters in 2006. The co-authors of this book was Zoltán Dörnyei and Nóra Németh. In this volume the results of the largest ever language attitude and motivation study was presented, involving over 13,000 adolescent language learners in Hungary. The participants were surveyed in 1993, 1999 and 2004. The authors claimed that the results are not confined to the European context but have much wider implications regarding attitude change, motivational dynamics and language globalisation.

In an article published in The Modern Language Journal, Csizér argued along with the co-authors Judit Kormos and Ágnes Sarkadi, that goals, attitudes, and motivation might be seen as a closely interconnected co-adaptive system, in which change in one of these motivational constructs also trigger change in the other closely related constructs. Their article was one of the first manuscripts which attempted to analyze motivation from a Complex Dynamic Systems Theory perspective.

Csizér claimed, along with Judit Kormos in article published in TESOL Quarterly in 2014, that strong instrumental goals and international posture, along with positive future self‐guides, might be the prerequisites for use of effective self‐regulatory strategies, which in turn might have an important role in influencing autonomous use of traditional and computer‐assisted learning resources.

=== Deaf learners ===
Another research area in which Csizér advanced the field of applied linguistics is the language learning of deaf learners. Along with Kontráné Hegybíró and Piniel, they wrote the first book on the deaf learners' language learning.

== Publications ==
=== Books ===
- Dörnyei, Z., Csizér, K., & Németh, N. (2006). Motivation, language attitudes and globalisation: A Hungarian perspective. Multilingual Matters.
- Csizér, K., & Magid, M. (2014). The Impact of Self-Concept on Language Learning. Channel View Publications.
- Lamb, M., Csizér, K., Henry, A., & Ryan, S. (2019). The Palgrave handbook of motivation for language learning. Palgrave Macmillan.
- Csizér, K. (2020). Second language learning motivation in a European context: The case of Hungary. Springer.

=== Articles ===
- Dörnyei, Z., & Csizér, K. (1998). Ten commandments for motivating language learners: results of an empirical study. Language Teaching Research, 2(3), 203–229. Ten commandments for motivating language learners: results of an empirical study
- Dörnyei, Z., & Csizér, K. (2002). Some Dynamics of Language Attitudes and Motivation: Results of a Longitudinal Nationwide Survey, Applied Linguistics, 23(4), 421–462, Some Dynamics of Language Attitudes and Motivation: Results of a Longitudinal Nationwide Survey
- Csizér, K., & Dörnyei, Z. (2005). Language Learners’ Motivational Profiles and Their Motivated Learning Behavior. Language Learning, 55(4), 613–659. Language Learners’ Motivational Profiles and Their Motivated Learning Behavior
- Csizér, K., & Dörnyei, Z. (2005). The Internal Structure of Language Learning Motivation and Its Relationship with Language Choice and Learning Effort. The Modern Language Journal, 89(1), 19–36. The Internal Structure of Language Learning Motivation and Its Relationship with Language Choice and Learning Effort
- Kormos, J., & Csizér, K. (2006). An interview study of inter-cultural contact and its role in language learning in a foreign language environment. System, 35(2), 241–258. An interview study of inter-cultural contact and its role in language learning in a foreign language environment
- Kormos, J., & Csizér, K. (2008). Age‐Related Differences in the Motivation of Learning English as a Foreign Language: Attitudes, Selves, and Motivated Learning Behavior. Language Learning, 58(2), 327–355. Age-Related Differences in the Motivation of Learning English as a Foreign Language: Attitudes, Selves, and Motivated Learning Behavior
- Csizér, K., & Kormos, J. (2008). Modelling the Role of Inter-Cultural Contact in the Motivation of Learning English as a Foreign Language. Applied Linguistics, 30(2), 166–185. Modelling the Role of Inter-Cultural Contact in the Motivation of Learning English as a Foreign Language
- Csizér, K., & Lukács, G. (2009). The comparative analysis of motivation, attitudes and selves: The case of English and German in Hungary. System, 38(1), 1–13. The comparative analysis of motivation, attitudes and selves: The case of English and German in Hungary
- Csizér, K., & Kormos, J., & Sarkadi, Á. (2010). The Dynamics of Language Learning Attitudes and Motivation: Lessons From an Interview Study of Dyslexic Language Learners. The Modern Language Journal, 94(3), 470–487. The Dynamics of Language Learning Attitudes and Motivation: Lessons From an Interview Study of Dyslexic Language Learners
- Kormos, J., Kiddle, T., & Csizér, K. (2011). Systems of Goals, Attitudes, and Self-related Beliefs in Second-Language-Learning Motivation. Applied Linguistics, 32(5), 495–516 Systems of Goals, Attitudes, and Self-related Beliefs in Second-Language-Learning Motivation
- Kormos, J., & Csizér, K. (2013). The interaction of motivation, self‐regulatory strategies, and autonomous learning behavior in different learner groups. TESOL Quarterly, 48(2). 275–299.
- You, C. J., Dörnyei, Z., & Csizér, K. (2015). Motivation, Vision, and Gender: A Survey of Learners of English in China. Language Learning, 66(1), 94–123. Motivation, Vision, and Gender: A Survey of Learners of English in China

== YouTube videos ==
- IATEFL-Hungary Veszprém 2014 e-sessions: Katalin Brózik-Piniel & Kata Csizér. IATEFL-Hungary. 13 October 2012. Archived from the original on 2 July 2021 – via YouTube.
- Guest Lecture: Dr. Kata Csizér. Graz: University of Graz. 14 June 2019. Archived from the original on 6 July 2024 – via YouTube.
