= Complex dynamic systems theory =

Theory in second language acquisition

Complex dynamic systems theory in the field of linguistics is a perspective and approach to the study of second, third and additional language acquisition. The general term complex dynamic systems theory was recommended by Kees de Bot to refer to both complexity theory and dynamic systems theory.

== Terminology ==
Numerous labels such as chaos theory, complexity theory, chaos/complexity theory, dynamic systems theory, usage-based theory have been used to the study of second language acquisition from a dynamic approach. However, Kees de Bot recommended the term complex dynamic systems theory in a chapter in Ortega and Han's edited book entitled 'Complexity Theory and Language Development in celebration of Diane Larsen-Freeman'. Ahmar Mahboob has applied Complexity Theory/Dynamic Systems Theory to a dynamic approach to language assessment. Herdina and Jessner in their Dynamic Model of Multilingualism (DMM) (2002) were the first scholars to use dynamic system, as well as complex system approaches to model third (and xth) language acquisition and development in a holistic systems framework.

In 1997 Larsen-Freeman used the terms chaos and complexity in her seminal article. Marjolijn Verspoor recommended the terms Dynamic Usage-Based Theory.

== Origins ==
The dynamic systems approach to second and additional language acquisition originates from applied mathematics which studies dynamical systems. The introduction of dynamic systems theory to study development in social sciences can be attributed to Esther Thelen who applied it to study motor development. She explained the A-not-B error from a dynamic systems theory perspective.

Diane Larsen-Freeman in her article entitled "Chaos/Complexity Science and Second Language Acquisition", published in 1997, was the first scientist to suggest the application and the introduction of dynamic systems theory to study second language acquisition. In her article she claimed that language should be viewed as a dynamic system which is dynamic, complex, nonlinear, chaotic, unpredictable, sensitive to initial conditions, open, self-organizing, feedback sensitive, and adaptive.

== Definition ==
In 1997, Larsen-Freeman published an article in which she claimed that second language acquisition should be viewed as a developmental process which includes language attrition as well as language acquisition. Herdina and Jessner (2002) in their DMM specify that dynamic multilingual systems do not only involve language attrition but also general language effort (GLE), which can be regarded as the sum of language acquisition effort (LAE) and language maintenance effort (LME) and understood as the effort invested in language development.

Second and additional language development is mainly studied by applying dynamical systems theory. In the DMM language is considered to be a system which includes many language subsystems. Dynamic systems are interconnected, nonlinear, adaptive, open, sensitive to initial conditions. Variability is seen as an inherent property of development and it is not viewed as measurement error, therefore from a dynamic systems perspective variability in the data is analysed and considered valuable information.

== Main characteristics ==
The main characteristics of multilingual development from a dynamic systems perspective are:

- Sensitive dependence on initial conditions
- Complete interconnectedness
- Nonlinearity in development
- Change through internal reorganization (self-organization) and interaction with the environment
- Dependence on internal and external resources
- Constant change, with chaotic variation sometimes, in which the systems only temporarily settle into attractor states
- Iteration
- Change caused by interaction with the environment and internal reorganization
- Emergent properties

There is sensitive dependence on initial conditions usually cited as the Butterfly effect. Different language learners start learning a second language (L2) with different background (different motivation, language aptitude etc.). The outcome critically depends on the initial conditions of the language learners. The systems of a language are completely interconnected. The development of the syntactic system affects the development of the lexical system and vice versa. Second language development is nonlinear that is language learners acquire new words in different tempo. On one day they might acquire ten new words, but the next day they may learn only one. On the third day they might even forget some of the previously learnt vocabulary. In second language development change occurs through self-organization which can take place unpredictably. Language learners' are dependent on internal and external resources. Internal resources are the motivational factors of the language learners, while the language teacher or the environment are examples of the external resources. The growth is described as an iterative process in second language development and it is often modelled by using coupled-equation models (logistic equation).

In a study on the role of self-regulation in linguistic development, Wind and Harding (2020) found that the low degree of variability in lexical and syntactic complexity in writing might be attributed to salient attractor states that dominated the participant's self-regulatory systems.

== Second and third language motivation ==
Dynamic systems theory has also been applied to study motivation in second and additional language learning. Motivational factors such as interest, boredom, anxiety are usually explicated as attractor states. Language motivation also fluctuates in time (on short time and long time scales). In 2014 Zoltán Dörnyei's book Motivational Dynamics in Language Learning was influential in reorienting second language motivation research by claiming that motivation is dynamic. Herdina and Jessner (2002) point out in their DMM that the complexity of multilingual systems is partly due to a number of individual factors, such as attitude, motivation and anxiety.

Sarah Mercer's journal article entitled Language learner self-concept: Complexity, continuity and change, published in System in 2011, investigated the nature and dynamics of self-concept in language learning. She found that self-concept is perhaps best conceived of as a complex, multilayered, multidimensional network of interrelated self-beliefs.

== Language assessment ==
Complexity Dynamic Systems Theory has also been applied to language assessment (e.g. by Ahmar Mahboob), self-assessment or self-reflection.

== Methods and techniques ==
Second and additional language development is mainly studied by applying time series data. It is contrasted with traditional techniques used in second language acquisition research such as Cross-sectional data research design (for example pre-test and post-test design) in cross-sectional studies.

Studies on additional language development prefer the case study approach rather than observing a larger population. Time-series data are usually plotted and inspected visually and correlations (usually Spearman's rank correlation coefficient since linguistic data are expected to be not normally distributed) are calculated. In 2002 Paul van Geert created techniques and methods to measure the degree of variability by applying min-max graphs, resampling techniques, and Monte Carlo method along with Marijn van Dijk.

More recently the hidden Markov model is used to detect phase shifts or transitional jumps in the development of language systems such as lexical or syntactic complexity. This model was first used for linguistic data by Chan in 2015 .

Hiver and Al-Hoorie's article, published in The Modern Language Journal in 2016, provides a "Dynamic ensemble for second language research". They present a practical catalog of 9 considerations: 1. systems, 2. level of granularity, 3. context, 4. systemic networks, 5. dynamic processes, 6. emergent outcomes, 7. components, 8. interactions, and 9. parameters. Their scoping review also reviews the methodological trends and substantive contribution of Complex Dynamic Systems Theory over a decade and a half.

== Criticism ==
The application of dynamical systems theory to study additional language acquisition has received criticism in the field. Gregg criticized Larsen-Freeman's book entitled Complex Systems and Applied Linguistics.

In contrast to traditional cross-sectional studies, the DST approach does not use componential observations, generalizability, or linear causality.

== Notable researchers ==
The following is a list of those researchers who support the idea that second, third, x-th language development should viewed from a dynamic systems perspective and have made major contributions to the field:

- Kees de Bot, University of Groningen
- Marijn van Dijk, University of Groningen
- Zoltán Dörnyei, University of Nottingham
- Nick Ellis, University of Michigan
- Paul van Geert, University of Groningen

- Diane Larsen-Freeman, University of Michigan
- Wander Lowie, University of Groningen
- Brian MacWhinney, Carnegie Mellon University
- Sarah Mercer, University of Graz
- Marjolijn Verspoor, University of Groningen
- Ulrike Jessner, University of Innsbruck
- Philip Herdina, professor emeritus
- Birgit Spechtenhauser, University of Bozen-Bolzano; University of Innsbruck
- Barbara Hofer, University of Innsbruck
- Vera Lúcia Menezes de Oliveira e Paiva, Federal University of Minas Gerais
- Walkyria Magno e Silva, Federal University of Pará

== See also ==
- Theories of second-language acquisition
- Second-language acquisition
