= Marijn van Dijk =

Dutch linguist

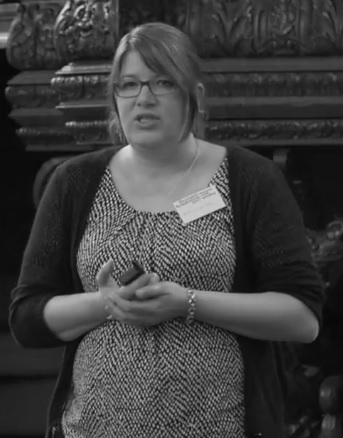
- Marijn van Dijk's presentation Language interactions in Early Science Lessons in 2017
- Born: 6 August 1972 (age 54); Heerlen, Netherlands
- Education: University of Groningen
- Known for: Developmental psychology; Second language acquisition; Complex Dynamic Systems Theory; Modeling and simulation
- Scientific career
- Fields: Developmental psychology; Second language acquisition; Complex Dynamic Systems Theory
- Workplaces: University of Groningen
- Thesis: Child Language Cuts Capers: Variability and Ambiguity in Early Child Development (2004)
- Doctoral advisor: Paul van Geert
- Website: van Dijk on the website of the University of Groningen

Marijn van Dijk (born 6 August 1972) is a Dutch linguist. She is currently an associate professor of developmental psychology at the Faculty of Behavioural and Social Sciences of the University of Groningen, Netherlands.

== Career ==
van Dijk obtained her PhD at the University of Groningen in 2004. The title of her thesis was Child Language Cuts Capers: Variability and Ambiguity in Early Child Development, and it was supervised by her future colleague Paul van Geert.

She is renowned for her work on developmental psychology and second language acquisition and the application of Complex Dynamic Systems Theory to study second language development. She is one of the members of the "Dutch School of Dynamic Systems" who proposed to apply time-series data to study second language development along with van Geert, Lowie, de Bot and Verspoor.

== Bibliography ==
=== Books ===
- A Dynamic Approach to Second Language Development. Methods and Techniques (2011)

=== Articles ===
- "Focus on variability: New tools to study intra-individual variability in developmental data." (2002)
- "Ambiguity in child language: the problem of interobserver reliability in ambiguous observation data." (2003)
- "Disentangling behavior in early child development: Interpretability of early child language and its effect on utterance length measures." (2005)
- "Wobbles, humps and sudden jumps: A case study of continuity, discontinuity and variability in early language development." (2007)
- "Variability in second language development from a dynamic systems perspective." (2008)
- "Variability in eating behavior throughout the weaning period." (2009)
- "An identity approach to second language acquisition." (2011)
- "The dynamics of feeding during the introduction to solid food." (2012)
- "Dynamic adaptation in child–adult language interaction." (2013)
- "A process approach to children's understanding of scientific concepts: A longitudinal case study." (2014)
