= Charles Alderson =

British linguist (born 1946)

- Born: 12 February 1946 (age 80); Lancaster, United Kingdom
- Education: University of Oxford; Edinburgh University
- Known for: Language assessment
- Awards: Honorary Fellow, Trinity College Laban, London (2010); Honorary Doctorate, Jyväskylä University, Finland (2009); Excellence in Doctoral Supervision, Lancaster University Staff Award (2008); Lifetime Achievement Award of the International Language Testing Association (2008)
- Scientific career
- Fields: Language assessment
- Institutions: University of Düsseldorf; University of Algiers; National Autonomous University of Mexico; University of Michigan; Lancaster University
- Thesis: A Study of the Cloze Procedure with Native and Non-Native Speakers of English (1977)
- Doctoral advisor: Alan Davies
- Website: Alderson on the website of Lancaster University

Charles Alderson (born 1946) is a British linguist. He is currently an honorary professor at the Department of Linguistics and English Language of Lancaster University, United Kingdom. His research focuses on language assessment.

== Career ==
Alderson attended Burnley Grammar School between 1957 and 1964. He obtained his Bachelor of Arts degree in German and French at the St Edmund Hall, Oxford of the University of Oxford in 1967. In 1972 he got a diploma in applied linguistics at the University of Edinburgh, where he obtained a PhD degree in 1977. His PhD thesis was entitled "A Study of the Cloze Procedure with Native and Non-Native Speakers of English", supervised by Dr Alan Davies.

Between 1969 and 1971 he was a lecturer in English at the University of Düsseldorf, West Germany. Between 1972 and 1974 he was British Council Lecturer in English at the University of Algiers, Algeria. In 1974 he became the Coordinator of the English language testing service at the University of Edinburgh. He was also a Tutor MSc in Applied Linguistics until 1977. During his time at the University of Edinburgh he co-authored the English Proficiency Test Battery (EPTB) Version D. In 1977 he was appointed as the Head of Research and Development Unit, Modern Language Centre (CELE), National Autonomous University of Mexico (UNAM), Mexico City. In 1979 he became the Director of Testing, English Language Institute, University of Michigan, Ann Arbor, Michigan, United States.

He was a teaching fellow (1980–1986) and the director (1985–1987) of the Institute for English Language Education, University of Lancaster. Between 1986 and 1989 he was senior teaching fellow, and senior lecturer (1989–1993). Since 1993 ha has been a professor of linguistics and English language education, at Lancaster University. Between 1994 and 1997 he also served as the head of department at Lancaster University.

Between 1998 and 2000 he was also a British Council adviser, Budapest, Hungary.

On 19 April 2017, Alderson along with Tineke Brunfaut, and Luke Harding were selected as the winner of the International Language Testing Association (ILTA) Best Article Award. The award-winning paper, Towards a Theory of Diagnosis in Second and Foreign Language Assessment: Insights from Professional Practice Across Diverse Fields, was published in 2015 in the journal Applied Linguistics. The study investigated how diagnosis is theorized and carried out across a diverse range of professions with a view to finding commonalities that can be applied to the context of second and foreign language assessment. On the basis of interviews with professionals from fields such as car mechanics, IT systems support, medicine, psychology and education, a set of principles was drawn up to facilitate inform a comprehensive theory of diagnostic assessment in a second or foreign language.

== Research ==
Alderson was Co-ordinator of the ENLTA Project (European Network for Language Testing and Assessment), funded by the European Commission from 2003 to 2005 to create EALTA, an organisation of individuals involved in language testing or assessment at any educational level.

Alderson was the developer of the DIALANG.

== Awards ==
- 2010: Honorary Fellow, Trinity College Laban, London
- 2009: Honorary Doctorate, Jyväskylä University, Finland
- 2009: Excellence in Doctoral Supervision, Lancaster University Staff Award
- 2008: Lifetime Achievement Award of the International Language Testing Association

== Publications ==
Alderson has published in several major journals such as Applied Linguistics, The Modern Language Journal, Language Testing, Language Awareness, Language Assessment Quarterly, Annual Review of Applied Linguistics, Language and Literature, and Language Teaching.

== Bibliography ==
=== Books ===
- Alderson, J. C., Alderson, J. C. (Ed.), Pizorn, K. (Ed.), Zemva, N. (Ed.), & Beaver, L. (Ed.) (2001). The language assistant scheme in Slovenia: a baseline study. Ljubljana: The British Council.
- Alderson, J. C., & Cseresznyés., M. (2003). Reading and use of English. (Into Europe). Budapest: Teleki László Foundation.
- Alderson, J. C. (2005). Diagnosing foreign language proficiency : the interface between learning and assessment. London: Continuum.
- Alderson, J. C., & Alderson, J. C. (Ed.) (2009). The politics of language education : individuals and institutions. (New Perspectives on Language and Education). Bristol: Multilingual Matters.
- Alderson, J. C. (2011). A lifetime of language testing. (Applied Linguistic Series). Shanghai: Shanghai Foreign Language Education Press.
- Alderson, J. C., Haapakangas, E-L., Huhta, A., Nieminen, L., & Ullakonoja, R. (2015). The diagnosis of reading in a second or foreign language. New York and London: Routledge.

=== Articles ===
- Alderson, J. C., Brunfaut, T., & Harding, L. (2015). Towards a theory of diagnosis in second and foreign language assessment: insights from professional practice across diverse fields. Applied Linguistics, 36(2), 236–260. doi:
- Harding, L., Alderson, C., & Brunfaut, T. (2015). Diagnostic assessment of reading and listening in a second or foreign language: elaborating on diagnostic principles. Language Testing, 32(3), 317–336. doi:
- Alderson, J. C., Nieminen, L., & Huhta, A. (2016). Characteristics of Weak and Strong Readers in a Foreign Language. Modern Language Journal, 100(4), 853–879. doi:
- Alderson, J. C., Brunfaut, T., & Harding, L. (2017). Bridging assessment and learning: a view from second and foreign language assessment. Assessment in Education: Principles, Policy and Practice, 24(3), 379–387. doi:
- Kremmel, B., Brunfaut, T., & Alderson, C. (2017). Exploring the role of phraseological knowledge in foreign language reading. Applied Linguistics, 38(6), 848–870. doi:
