= John Alderson =

John Alderson may refer to:

- John Alderson (physician) (1758–1829), English physician
- John D. Alderson (1854–1910), United States Representative from West Virginia
- Jack Alderson (1891–1972), English footballer
- John Alderson (footballer) (fl. 1930–1932), English footballer
- John Alderson (actor) (1916–2006), English-born Hollywood actor
- John Alderson (police officer) (1922–2011), British police officer, Chief Constable of Devon and Cornwall, 1973–1982
- John Alderson (cricketer) (1929–2022), New Zealand cricketer

== See also ==
- Alderson (disambiguation)
