= Luke Harding (linguist) =

Australian linguist

Luke William Harding
- Born: 11 July 1977 (age 49); Melbourne, Australia
- Education: University of Melbourne
- Known for: Language assessment
- Scientific career
- Fields: Language assessment
- Workplaces: University of Melbourne; Lancaster University
- Thesis: The use of speakers with L2 accents in academic English listening assessment : a validation study (2008)
- Website: Hading on the website of Lancaster University

Luke William Harding (born 11 July 1977) is an Australian linguist. He is currently a professor at the Department of Linguistics and English Language of Lancaster University, United Kingdom. His research focuses on language assessment with a special focus on listening assessment, pronunciation assessment, and diagnostic language assessment. He is the current editor-in-chief of the journal, Language Testing.

== Career ==
Harding obtained his Bachelor of Arts degree in Linguistics at the University of Melbourne in 2002. Later he got his Master of Arts degree in Applied Linguistics and a PhD degree in Applied Linguistics at the University of Melbourne in 2008.

Since 2011 Harding has been a professor at the Department of Linguistics and English Language of Lancaster University, United Kingdom since 2010.

On 19 April 2017, Harding along with Charles Alderson and Tineke Brunfaut were selected as the winner of the International Language Testing Association (ILTA) Best Article Award. The award-winning paper, Towards a Theory of Diagnosis in Second and Foreign Language Assessment: Insights from Professional Practice Across Diverse Fields, was published in 2015 in the journal Applied Linguistics. The study investigated how diagnosis is theorized and carried out across a diverse range of professions with a view to finding commonalities that can be applied to the context of second and foreign language assessment. On the basis of interviews with professionals from fields such as car mechanics, IT systems support, medicine, psychology and education, a set of principles was drawn up to facilitate inform a comprehensive theory of diagnostic assessment in a second or foreign language.

On 9 October 2018, Harding was an invited speaker at Georgetown University, Washington, D.C. He delivered a speech entitled "English as a Lingua Franca and Language Assessment: Challenges and Opportunities".

As of 2019, he is a co-editor of the journal Language Testing.

== Research ==
In a journal article, published in 2012 in Language Testing, Harding investigated the potential for a shared-L1 advantage on an academic English listening test featuring speakers with L2 accents.

== Publications ==
Harding has published in several major journals such as Applied Linguistics, Language Testing, Language Teaching, Assessing Writing, and Language Assessment Quarterly. He has also published journal articles with Charles Alderson.

== Bibliography ==
=== Books ===
- Harding, L. (2011). Accent and listening assessment: A validation study of the use of speakers with L2 accents on an academic English listening test. (Language Testing and Evaluation; Vol. 21). Frankfurt: Peter Lang.

=== Articles ===
- Elder, C., & Harding, L. (2008). Language Testing and English as an International Language Constraints and Contributions. Australian Review of Applied Linguistics, 31(3), 34.1-34.11.
- Harding, L., Pill, J., & Ryan, K. (2011). Assessor decision-making while marking a note-taking listening test: the case of the OET. Language Assessment Quarterly, 8(2), 108-126. doi:10.1080/15434303.2011.556770
- Harding, L. (2012). Accent, listening assessment and the potential for a shared-L1 advantage: a DIF perspective. Language Testing, 29(2), 163-180. doi:10.1177/0265532211421161
- Harding, L. (2014). Communicative language testing: current issues and future research. Language Assessment Quarterly, 11(2), 186-197. doi:10.1080/15434303.2014.895829
- Alderson, J. C., Brunfaut, T., & Harding, L. (2015). Towards a theory of diagnosis in second and foreign language assessment: insights from professional practice across diverse fields. Applied Linguistics, 36(2), 236-260. doi:10.1093/applin/amt046
- Harding, L., Alderson, C., & Brunfaut, T. (2015). Diagnostic assessment of reading and listening in a second or foreign language: elaborating on diagnostic principles. Language Testing, 32(3), 317-336. doi:10.1177/0265532214564505
- Isaacs, T., & Harding, L. (2017). Pronunciation assessment. Language Teaching, 50(3), 347-366. doi:10.1017/S0261444817000118
- Alderson, J. C., Brunfaut, T., & Harding, L. (2017). Bridging assessment and learning: a view from second and foreign language assessment. Assessment in Education: Principles, Policy and Practice, 24(3), 379-387. doi:10.1080/0969594X.2017.1331201
- Brunfaut, T., Harding, L., & Batty, A. (2018). Going online: The effect of mode of delivery on performances and perceptions on an English L2 writing test suite. Assessing Writing, 36, 3-18. doi:10.1016/j.asw.2018.02.003
- Toomaneejinda, A., & Harding, L. W. (2018). Disagreement practices in ELF academic group discussion: Verbal, non-verbal and interactional strategies. Journal of English as a Lingua Franca, 7(2), 307–332. doi:10.1515/jelf-2018-0016
- Harding, L., Brunfaut, T., & Unger, J. W. (2019). Language testing in the 'hostile environment': The discursive construction of 'secure English language testing' in the United Kingdom. Applied Linguistics. doi:10.1093/applin/amz017

== YouTube videos ==
- October 2018: Luke Harding: English as a Lingua Franca and Language Assessment: Challenges and Opportunities
- June 2020: World Englishes and English as a lingua franca
