= Judit Kormos =

Hungarian linguist

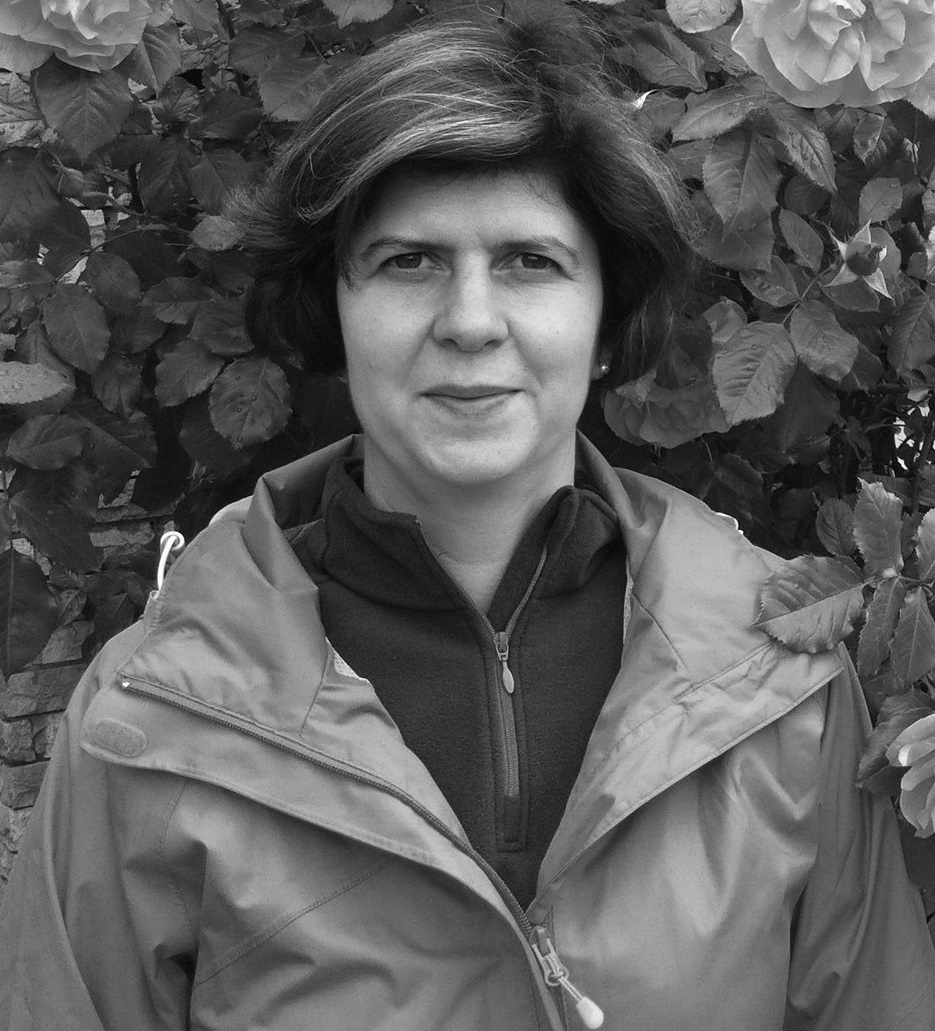
- Born: 1 December 1970 (age 55); Budapest, Hungary
- Education: Eötvös Loránd University
- Known for: Second Language Acquisition; Motivation in second-language learning; Second language writing; Dyslexia research
- Awards: Solidarity Award (2006); Pilkington Teaching Award (2012); Duke of Edinburgh Book Prize Shortlist (2012); National Teaching Fellowship (2013)
- Scientific career
- Fields: Second Language Acquisition; Motivation in second-language learning; Second language learning; Second language writing; Dyslexia research
- Workplaces: Eötvös Loránd University; Lancaster University; University of Vienna
- Doctoral advisor: Zoltán Dörnyei
- Website: Kormos on the website of Lancaster University

Judit Kormos (Hungarian pronunciation: [ˈjudit ˈkormoʃ]) (born 1970) is a Hungarian linguist. She is a professor and the Director of Studies for the MA TESOL Distance programme at the Department of Linguistics and English Language at Lancaster University, United Kingdom. She is renowned for her work on motivation in second language learning, and self-regulation in second language writing. Her current interest is in dyslexia in second language learning.

== Career ==
Kormos graduated from ELTE Apáczai Csere János Gymnasium in 1989. In her final year, she received the Apáczai Award.

Kormos graduated at the School of English and American Studies of the Faculty of Humanities of the Eötvös Loránd University in Budapest, Hungary in 1994. Kormos gained her PhD at the Eötvös Loránd University in 1999. Her PhD was supervised by Zoltán Dörnyei. Kormos took up a lecturer position at the Lancaster University in 2008. and was promoted to a Readership in 2012. She chose to be called Reader in Second Language Acquisition. On 8 January 2015, Kormos was awarded a personal chair. Her title became "Professor of Second Language Acquisition".

She was one the coordinators of the Dyslexia For Teachers Of English Foreign Language Project, funded by the European Commission. Since 2011, she has been a member of the editorial board of the Journal of Second Language Writing. She has been an Editor of Special Thematic Issues and Associate Journal Editor of the Language Learning.

In 2012, Kormos was interviewed by the Hungarian television channel ATV on recent changes in foreign language teaching policies in Hungary. She emphasised the important role of teaching students to learn foreign languages independently and autonomously with the help of modern technological tools. On 21 May 2014, Pearson Education released a new video lecture series on dyslexia and foreign language learning on YouTube. Kormos features in the first video of the series and discusses the psychological effects of dyslexia on the processes of foreign language learning.

In 2014, Kormos together with a European team from five partner countries won the ELTons award of the British Council in the Excellence in Course Innovation category.

== Research ==
On 20 June 2014, she was cited in the Education webpage of the Guardian in a recent article on teaching languages to students with disabilities. She said that teaching methods and materials need to be adapted for dyslexic students, instead of taking them out of second language classes. Dyslexic students are able to acquire another language successfully and they have to be provided a chance. The teacher should be aware of the dyslexia and teach a bit differently. For example, teachers should include more visual materials, act things out and explain things slightly more explicitly than they would to other students. Some learners are more receptive to audio channels of learning, others to visual. Therefore, using a combination of the two may be really effective.

== Academic Awards ==
- 2012: Duke of Edinburgh Book Prize Shortlist
- 2012: Pilkington Teaching Award
- 2013: National Teaching Fellowship

== Bibliography ==
=== Books ===
- Kontráné Hegybíró, E., & Kormos, J. (2006). Testing for language teachers. Budapest: Okker Kiadó.
- Kormos, J. (2006). Speech production and second language acquisition. (Cognitive sciences and second language acquisition). Mahwah, N.J.: Lawrence Erlbaum Associates.
- Kormos, J., & Kontra, E. H. (2008). Language learners with special needs: an international perspective. Bristol: Multilingual Matters.
- Kormos, J., & Smith, A. M. (2012). Teaching foreign languages to learners with specific learning differences. Bristol: Multilingual Matters.
- Kormos, J. (Editor) (2014). Speech production and second language acquisition. Routledge. ISBN 978-0805856583
- Dóczi, B., & Kormos, J. (2016). Longitudinal developments in vocabulary knowledge and lexical organization. New York: Oxford University Press.
- Kormos, J. (2017). The Second Language Learning Processes of Students with Specific Learning Difficulties. (Second Language Acquisition Research Series). New York: Routledge
- Kormos, J., & Smith, A. M. (2023). Teaching foreign languages to learners with specific learning differences. 2nd edition Channel View Publications

=== Articles and chapters ===
Top 5 articles and chapters based on Google Scholar.

- Dörnyei, Z., & Kormos, J. (2000). The role of individual and social variables in task performance. Language Teaching Research, 4(3), 275–300. doi:The role of individual and social variables in oral task performance
- Kormos, J. & Dénes M. (2004). Exploring measures and perceptions of fluency in the speech of second language learners. System, 32(2), 145–164.Exploring measures and perceptions of fluency in the speech of second language learners
- Kormos J. & Csizér K. (2008). Age‐related differences in the motivation of learning English as a foreign language: Attitudes, selves, and motivated learning behavior. Language Learning, 58(2), 327–355. doi:Age-Related Differences in the Motivation of Learning English as a Foreign Language: Attitudes, Selves, and Motivated Learning Behavior
- Csizér, K., & Kormos, J. (2009). Learning experiences, selves and motivated learning behaviour : a comparative analysis of structural models for Hungarian secondary and university learners of English. In Z. Dörnyei, & E. Ushioda (Eds.), Motivation, language identity and the L2 self. (pp. 98–117). Multilingual Matters.
- Kormos, J., Kiddle, T., & Csizér, K. (2011). Goals, attitudes and self-related beliefs in second language learning motivation : an interactive model of language learning motivation. Applied Linguistics, 32(5), 495.
