= Elaine Tarone =

American linguist

Elaine Tarone is a retired professor of applied linguistics and is a distinguished teaching professor emerita at the University of Minnesota. She is currently a member of the editorial board of The Modern Language Journal.

== Teaching and research ==
Tarone's published research on second-language acquisition began in 1972, and, as of 2018, includes 10 books and more than 135 papers in scholarly journals and edited volumes. From 1996 until her retirement from the University of Minnesota in 2016, she was director of the university's Center for Advanced Research on Language Acquisition (CARLA). A major research interest has been the sociolinguistic factors affecting second-language acquisition, and she is particularly known for her work on interlanguage, interlanguage variation and the impact of emergent alphabetic print literacy on oral second-language acquisition.

In 1972, she published the first paper on interlanguage phonology, and in 1978, the first research on communication strategies in second-language acquisition. She has also published research on the grammatical-rhetorical structure of academic writing.

Her 1989 book with George Yule, Focus on the Language Learner, aims to provide a clear overview of second-language acquisition research issues of importance to language teachers. Her co-authored 2009 book Exploring Learner Language helps language teachers develop skills and use tools to analyze learner language samples provided in transcribed videos of adult second-language learners. Her most recent research publications focus on second-language learners' spontaneous language play in oral discourse, and especially the interlanguage variation revealed in oral narratives when learners enact imagined voices of protagonists who are both more- and less-proficient than they are.
