= Language assessment =

Evaluation of a person's language ability

Language assessment or language testing is a field of study under the umbrella of applied linguistics. Its main focus is the assessment of first, second or other language in the school, college, or university context; assessment of language use in the workplace; and assessment of language in the immigration, citizenship, and asylum contexts.

The assessment may include listening, speaking, reading, writing, an integration of two or more of these skills, or other constructs of language ability. Equal weight may be placed on knowledge (understanding how the language works theoretically) and proficiency (ability to use the language practically), or greater weight may be given to one aspect or the other.

== History ==
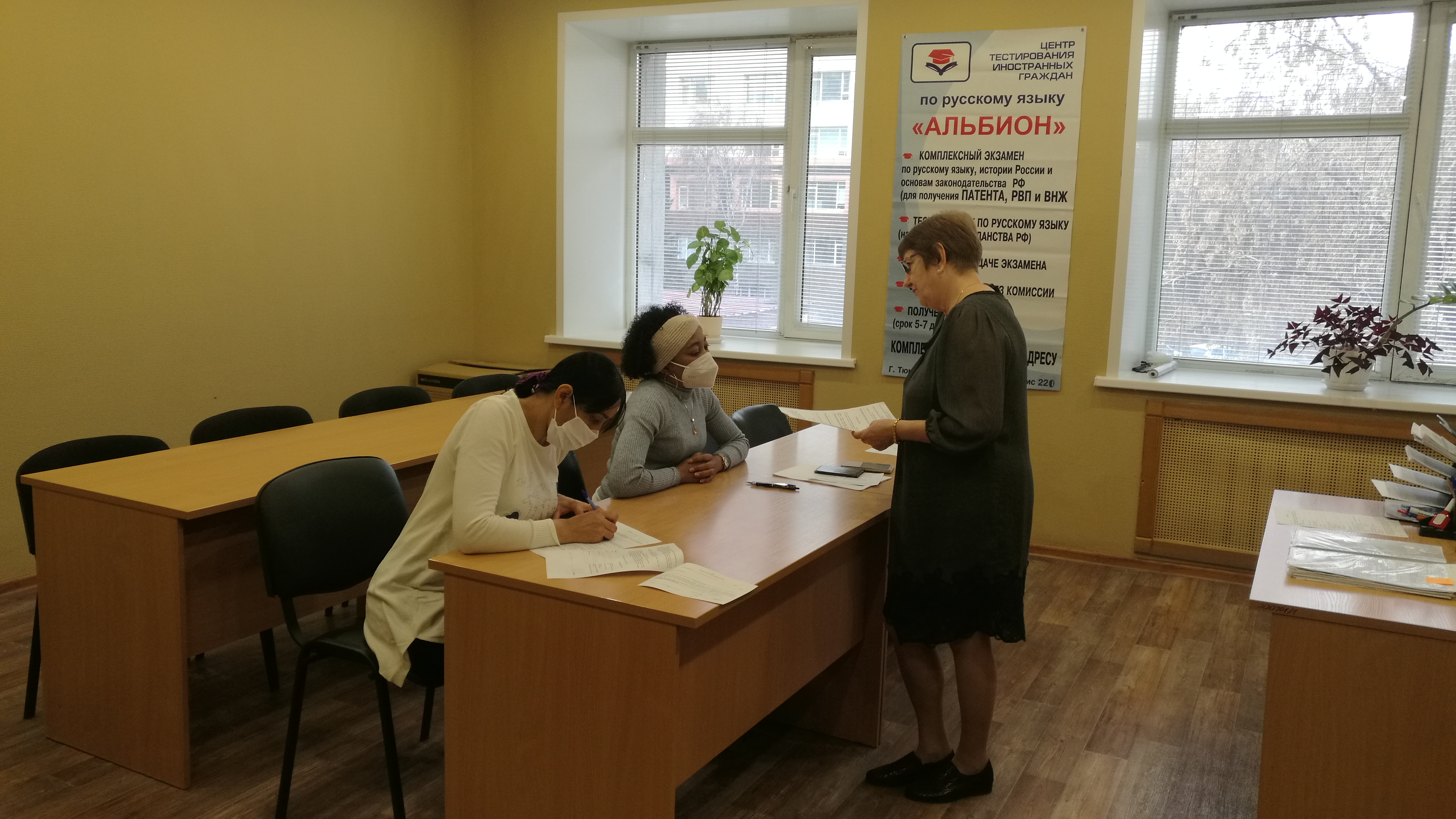
Language assessment in Tyumen, Russia, 2021.

The history of language testing may have originated in the late nineteenth century testing of ESL at Cambridge and Oxford in England, but the earliest works in language assessment in the United States date back to the 1950s to the pioneering studies and test created by Robert Lado and David Harris. The earliest large scale assessments in the United States were referred to as the Michigan Tests, developed by the English Language Institute at the University of Michigan, now known as Michigan Language Assessment, and the Test of English as a Foreign Language (TOEFL) developed by Educational Testing Service (ETS), Princeton, New Jersey.

The English Language Institute at the University of Michigan (Michigan Language Assessment) was established in 1941 and was the first of its kind in the United States. Charles Fries, Director of ELI, and Robert Lado, Director of Testing at ELI, were determined to put foreign language teaching and testing on a "scientific" footing. The first test launched in 1946 was the Lado Test of Aural Comprehension. Approximately 10 years later, a full suite of tests had been assembled: "an English language test battery", which was administered to incoming foreign students at Michigan and other universities and was known as the Michigan English Language Assessment Battery. In 1953, the ELI also developed the ECPE (Examination for the Certificate of Proficiency in English) exam, under contract to the United States Information Agency, for use abroad. The Michigan Tests continue to support international student and professional mobility and include the Michigan English Test (MET), which is offered worldwide at testing centers and remotely.

TOEFL was launched in 1961 and was designed to assess the English language ability of students applying for admission to U.S. and Canadian colleges and universities. This test, which is used widely around the world, is still in use although it is now only available in the internet-based format (now called the TOEFL iBT).

Many tests from other companies, universities and agencies compete for this market: iTEP (International Test of English Proficiency), the Canadian English Language Proficiency Index Program (CELPIP) Test, the Pearson Language Test's Pearson Test of English (PTE), Michigan Language Assessment exams include Michigan English Test (MET), Examination for the Certificate of Competency in English (ECCE) and Examination for the Certificate of Proficiency in English (ECPE), and the British Council and the Australian IDP's International English Language Testing System (IELTS). In the United States, non-profit and other organizations such as the Center for Applied Linguistics, Washington, D.C., and Language Testing International, White Plains, New York, have developed language tests that are used by many public and private agencies. Many universities too, like the University of California, Los Angeles, Teachers College, Columbia University, and the University of Illinois, Urbana-Champaign, have developed English (and other) language tests to assess the abilities of their students and teaching assistants. These language assessments are generally known as proficiency or achievement assessments.

Other modern English language tests developed include The General English Proficiency Test (GEPT) in Taiwan, the College English Test in China, and the STEP Eiken in Japan. New technology has also made a presence in the field: Versant's English and Dutch assessments use phone technology to record the speaking and automated scoring of their speaking tests, and the ETS is currently experimenting with automated scoring of their writing tests.

== Organizations ==
The International Language Testing Association (ILTA) is one of the many organizations that organizes conferences, workshops, and a public forum for the discussion of important matters. ILTA's major annual conference is the Language Testing Research Colloquium.

Educational Testing Service, Princeton, New Jersey, the home of the TOEFL, offers an annual outstanding Doctoral Dissertation Award in Second or Foreign Language and the University of Cambridge, UK, also offers an annual outstanding master's degree Award in second language testing. In Europe, there are two organizations: the Association of Language Testers of Europe (ALTE) and the European Association for Language Testing and Assessment (EALTA). All of these associations have developed Codes of Ethics and Practice that all language assessment professionals are expected to adhere to.

== Annual conferences ==
There are many annual conferences on general or specific topics. Among the most important conferences is ILTA's official conference: the Language Testing Research Colloquium (LTRC), which has been held every year since 1978. In the last few years, it has been held in different parts of the world: Temecula, California, US (2004); Ottawa, Canada (2005); Melbourne, Australia (2006); Barcelona, Spain (2007); Hangzhou, China (2008), and Denver, Colorado (2009), Cambridge, UK (2010), Ann Arbor, Michigan (2011), Princeton, New Jersey (2012), and Seoul, South Korea (2013).

ALTE's international conferences are held in different cities in Europe: Barcelona, Spain (2002); Berlin, Germany (2005); Cambridge, UK (2008); Krakow, Poland (2011); Paris, France (2014); Bologna, Italy (2017) ) with regional conferences in Perugia, Prague, Budapest, Sofia, and Lisbon. Similarly, there are regional meetings in China, Japan, Korea, and Taiwan. International conference themes have included supporting the European Year of Languages (2001), the impact of multilingualism (2005), the wider social and educational impact of assessment (2008) and the role of language frameworks (2011). Selected conference papers have been published through the Studies in Language Testing (SiLT) volumes.

== Language assessments in aviation ==
The aviation personnel is required to be regularly tested on aviation language proficiency. The testing is required on the international basis by ICAO Doc 9835. Within the EASA region, the aviation language assessments are required by Ec 1178/2011, Part FCL, FCL.055.

=== Endorsements ===
Each flight crew license is endorsed by the respective endorsement specifying the holder's language proficiency. The level acceptable for the operational use in the aviation is 4 thru 6. The validity of the respective level varies with the region.

=== Organizations ===
The organizations authorized to conduct the language assessments on behalf of national aviation authorities are so-called "Language assessment bodies" or "Testing service providers". Each and every Language assessment body is issued with the Certificate of approval with its authorizations. Aero Language and Myflower College are one of several organizations in Europe authorized to conduct the language assessments for pilots and air traffic controllers.

== Publications ==
There are two premier journals in the field: Language Assessment Quarterly (published by Routledge/Taylor & Francis) and Language Testing (published by SAGE Publications) that publishes major findings from researchers. Both these journals are indexed in Thompson's SSCI list. Other journals that publish articles from the field include Applied Linguistics, Language Learning, TESOL Quarterly, Assessing Writing, and System. Some of these journals have special issue volumes on Ethics in language assessment, structural equation modeling, language assessment in Asia, Classroom assessment, etc. and commentaries, brief reports, and book and test reviews.

The field has exploded in the last twenty years in terms of textbooks and research publications. The most popular books include: Lyle Bachman's Fundamental considerations in language testing, and Statistical Analyses for Language Assessment, Lyle Bachman and Adrian Palmer's Language Testing in Practice and Language Assessment in Practice, Glenn Fulcher and Fred Davidson's 'Language Testing and Assessment: An Advanced Resource Book', Charles Alderson's 'Assessing Reading, John Read's Assessing Vocabulary, James Purpura's Assessing Grammar, Gary Buck's Assessing Listening, Sara Weigle's Assessing Writing,' Glenn Fulcher's 'Practical Language Testing' and 'Testing Second Language Speaking'. Edited volumes include: Alister Cumming's Validation in Language Testing, Antony John Kunnan's Validation in Language Assessment, and Fairness in Language Assessment, and the Routledge Handbook of Language Testing, edited by Glenn Fulcher and Fred Davidson.

The most popular book series are Michael Milanovic, Cyril Weir, and Lynda Taylor's Studies in Language Testing (SiLT) series, and Lyle Bachman and Charles Alderson's Cambridge Language Assessment Series.

== Courses ==
Language assessment or language testing courses are taught as required or elective courses in many graduate and doctoral programs, particularly in the subjects of applied linguistics, English for Speakers of Other Languages, English as a second or foreign language, or educational linguistics. These programs are known as MA or PhD programs in Applied Linguistics, Educational Linguistics, TESOL, TEFL, or TESL. The focus of most courses is on test development, psychometric qualities of tests, validity, reliability and fairness of tests, and classical true score measurement theory. Additional courses focus on item response theory, factor analysis, structural equation modeling, G theory, latent growth modeling, qualitative analysis of test performance data such as conversation and discourse analysis, and politics and language policy issues.

Universities that have regular courses and programs that focus on language assessment at the PhD level include Iowa State University, University of Illinois, Urbana-Champaign, University of Hawaiʻi at Mānoa, Teachers College, Columbia University, Penn State University, Georgia State University, Northern Arizona University, McGill University, University of Toronto, Lancaster University (UK), University of Leicester, University of Bristol, University of Cambridge, University of Bedfordshire, and Guangdong University of Foreign Studies (China); at the MA level include Lancaster University, University of Leicester, University of Hawaiʻi at Mānoa, California State Universities at Fullerton, Los Angeles, Long Beach, San Jose, and San Francisco.

== Scales ==
=== General scales ===
| CEFR | ILR | ACTFL | NB OPS | CLB | PSC PSC |
|---|---|---|---|---|---|
| A1 | 0/0+/1 | Novice (Low/Mid/High) | Unrated/0+/1 | 1/2 | A |
| A2 | 1+ | Intermediate (Low/Mid/High) | 1+/2 | 3/4 | B |
| B1 | 2 | Advanced Low | 2+ | 5/6 | C |
| B2 | 2+ | Advanced Mid | 3 | 7/8 | |
| C1 | 3/3+ | Advanced High | 3+ | 9/10 | |
| C2 | 4 | Superior | 4 | 11/12 | |
| | 4+/5 | | | | |

== Other Test Types ==
- Test of English for International Communication (TOEIC)

Accepted and trusted by 14,000+ organizations in more than 160 countries, the TOEIC® tests assess your English-language proficiency across all four language skills needed to succeed in the global workplace—listening, reading, speaking and writing. With your TOEIC score, you can: get a fair, accurate evaluation of your ability to communicate in English; show potential employers your full range of communication skills; differentiate yourself from the competition; expand your job opportunities.

== See also ==
- List of language proficiency tests
- Language proficiency
- Washback effect
