= Marjolijn Verspoor =

Dutch linguist

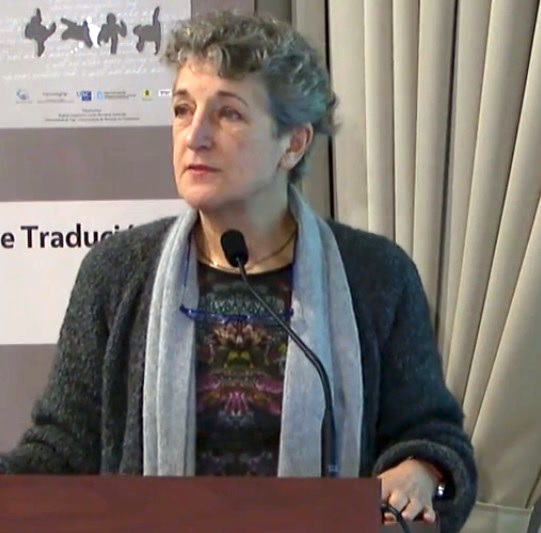
- Verspoor at the University of Vigo, 2015
- Born: 11 March 1952 (age 74); Leiden, South Holland, The Netherlands
- Education: Leiden University (PhD)
- Known for: Second language acquisition; Second language writing; Complex Dynamic Systems Theory; Usage-based linguistics
- Spouse: Kees de Bot
- Scientific career
- Fields: Second language acquisition; Second language writing; Complex Dynamic Systems Theory; Usage-based linguistics
- Workplaces: University of Groningen; University of Pannonia
- Thesis: Semantic Criteria in Complement Selection (1990)
- Website: Verspoor on the website of the University of Groningen

Marjolijn Verspoor (born 11 March 1952) is a Dutch linguist. She is a professor of English language and English as a second language at the University of Groningen, Netherlands. She is known for her work on Complex Dynamic Systems Theory and the application of dynamical systems theory to study second language development. Her interest is also in second language writing.

She is one of the members of the "Dutch School of Dynamic Systems" who proposed to apply time-series data to study second language development along with Kees Bot, Paul Geert, and Wander Lowie.

== Career ==
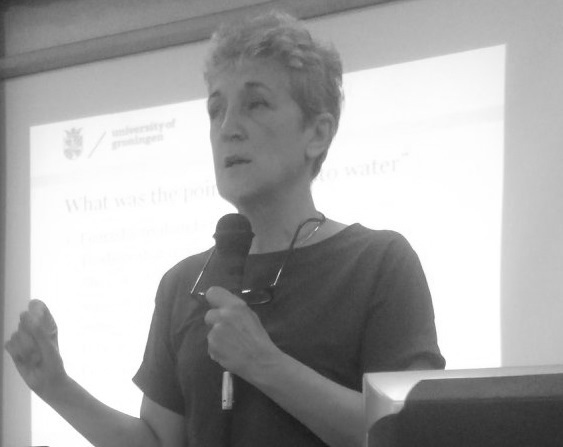
Verspoor in 2018

Verspoor obtained her PhD at Leiden University in 1990. The title of her thesis was Semantic Criteria in Complement Selection.

Verspoor has published journal articles and edited several books on different areas of linguistics, including second language development, effects of bilingual education, effects of cognitive insights into second language development, cognitive linguistic approach to English complementation.

Verspoor was appointed as a research assistant and teaching assistant in German at the German department of the Louisiana State University, The United States in 1973. In 1976, she was appointed as an instructor of German, French and English as a second language in the foreign language department at the Northeast Louisiana University. In 1989, she became an assistant professor at the English department of the University of Missouri where she was also the coordinator of 'Academic English for International students' program. Between 1991 and 1994, she was an instructor at the English department of the Rijksuniversiteit Groningen. Between 1995 and 2005, she was appointed as the Chair National Exam Board (CEVO: VWO-HAVO) for English. She was responsible for content of national English exam. Since 1994, she has been a university lecturer at the English department of the University of Groningen. Between 2005 and 2009, she was appointed as the study advisor and coordinator MA program Applied Linguistics-Teaching English as a foreign language.

In 2009, she was nominated for the University of Groningen Best Lecturer Award 2009.

She is one of the members of the Solidarity Award Committee of the International Association of Applied Linguistics along with Kees de Bot and Rosa Manchón.

In 2016, she was one of the keynote speakers at the EUROSLA26 at the University of Jyväskylä, Finland.

In July 2020, a book, entitled Usage-based Dynamics in Second Language Acquisition, was published to honour her work in the field of applied linguistics. The book was edited by her colleagues at the University of Groningen, including Wander Lowie. Among the contributors there are Ronald Langacker, Diane Larsen-Freeman, Luke Harding and Kees de Bot. The book was planned to be presented to her at the AILA conference in Groningen. However, the conference was postponed due to the Coronavirus Pandemic.

== Works ==
Verspoor has published articles in journals such as Applied Linguistics, Journal of Second Language Writing, The Modern Language Journal, Language Teaching Research, and Language Learning.

In 2004, she wrote a seminal article along with de Bot and Lowie on second language development, in which she applied the dynamic systems theory to study second language writing development. This was the first research paper in which time-series data were used to explicate changes in the development of second language writing.

In 2015, Verspoor presented A dynamic perspective on developmental patterns in Finnish as an L2 at the ELC 4. Fourth International Postgraduate Conference on Language and Cognition at the University of Vigo.

In 2017, Verspoor's first article was published in which she and her colleagues applied the Hidden Markov Model to simulate language development.

She is also noted for her work on language complexity. She proposed the finite verb ratio index to measure general syntactic complexity and the average word length of content words to gauge lexical complexity in second language writing development.

== Bibliography ==
=== Books ===
- Lexical and Syntactical Constructions and the Construction of Meaning (1997)
- Cognitive Exploration of Language and Linguistics (1998)
- Explorations in Linguistic Relativity (2000)
- Second Language Acquisition: An Advanced Resource Book (2005)
- A Dynamic Approach to Second Language Development. Methods and Techniques (2011)

=== Articles ===
Top 5 articles based on Google scholar.:

- De Bot, K.; Lowie, W.; Verspoor, M. (2007). "A dynamic systems theory approach to second language acquisition". Bilingualism: Language and Cognition. 10 (1): 7–21. doi:10.1017/s1366728906002732. S2CID 33567516.
- Verspoor, M.; Lowie, M.; van Dijk, M. (2008). "Variability in second language development from a dynamic systems perspective". The Modern Language Journal. 92 (2): 214–231. doi:10.1111/j.1540-4781.2008.00715.x.
- Verspoor, M.; Lowie, W. (2003). "Making sense of polysemous words". Language learning. 53 (3): 547–586. doi:10.1111/1467-9922.00234.
- Spoelman, M.; Verspoor, M. (2010). "Dynamic patterns in development of accuracy and complexity: A longitudinal case study in the acquisition of Finnish". Applied Linguistics. 31 (4): 532–553. doi:10.1093/applin/amq001.
- Verspoor, M.; Schmid, M. (2012). "S., & Xu X. (2012). A dynamic usage based perspective on L2 writing". Journal of Second Language Writing. 21 (3): 239–263. doi:10.1016/j.jslw.2012.03.007. hdl:11370/46f0d209-1fbb-4b17-9230-aa915e8c5898.
