= Paul van Geert =

Dutch linguist

Paul Geert
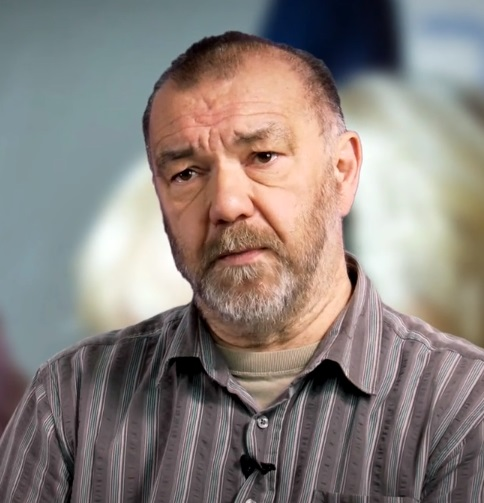
- Geert in 2011
- Born: 8 January 1950 (age 76); Temse, East Flanders, Belgium
- Education: Ghent University (PhD)
- Known for: Developmental psychology; Complex Dynamic Systems Theory; Modeling and simulation
- Spouse: Waegeman
- Children: David van Geert (1972); Liesbet van Geert (1974)
- Scientific career
- Fields: Developmental psychology; Complex Dynamic Systems Theory
- Workplaces: University of Groningen
- Thesis: Language development in the light of cognition and perception (1975)
- Doctoral students: Marijn Dijk (2004)
- Website: van Geert on the website of the University of Groningen

Paul van Geert (born 8 January 1950) is a Dutch linguist. He is currently a professor of developmental psychology at the University of Groningen, Netherlands. He is renowned for his work on developmental psychology and the application of dynamical systems theory in social science.

He is one of the members of the "Dutch School of Dynamic Systems" who proposed to apply time series data to study second language development along with de Bot, Lowie, and Verspoor.

== Career ==
Between 1967 and 1971, Geert studied psychology and educational sciences at Ghent University. In 1975, he was awarded with a PhD in Developmental psychology. In 1976, he became a lecturer at the University of Groningen.

In 1976, he was appointed as a Lecturer and in 1978 he became a Senior Lecturer at the University of Groningen. Between 1978 and 1979, he was a fellow at the Netherlands Institute of Advanced Studies in the Humanities and Social Sciences. In 1985, he was appointed as a Professor of Psychology and a Chair of Developmental Psychology at the University of Groningen. Between 1990 and 1992, he was the Dean of the Department of Psychology at the University of Groningen. Between 1992 and 1993, he was a fellow at the Center for Advanced Study in the Behavioral Sciences at Stanford University in California.

== Work ==
Paul Geert was the first to apply the logistic function to model first language development in 1991.

He developed a Microsoft Excel VBA code to model developmental data in 2003.

In 2002, he created new techniques and methods to measure the degree of variability by applying min-max graphs, resampling techniques, and Monte Carlo method along with Marijn van Dijk.

== Supervision ==
He supervised his future colleague at the University of Groningen, Marijn Dijk, who obtained her PhD in 2004. The title of her PhD Thesis was Child Language Cuts Capers: Variability and Ambiguity in Early Child Development.

== Bibliography ==
=== Books ===
- A Dynamic Systems Model of Cognitive and Language Growth (1991)
- Dynamic Systems of Development: Change between Complexity and Chaos (1994)

=== Articles ===
- "A dynamic systems model of cognitive and language growth." (1991)
- "A dynamic systems model of basic developmental mechanisms: Piaget, Vygotsky, and beyond." (1998)
- "The dynamics of general developmental mechanisms: From Piaget and Vygotsky to dynamic systems models." (2000)
- "Focus on variability: New tools to study intra-individual variability in developmental data." (2002)
- "Dynamic systems approaches and modeling of developmental processes." (2003)
- "Explaining after by before: Basic aspects of a dynamic systems approach to the study of development." (2005)
- "The dynamics of scaffolding." (2005)
- "Wobbles, humps and sudden jumps: A case study of continuity, discontinuity and variability in early language development." (2007)
- "Time and identity: A framework for research and theory formation." (2008)
- "The dynamic systems approach in the study of L1 and L2 acquisition: An introduction." (2008)
