= Alderson =

Alderson may refer to:

== Places ==
- Alderson, Oklahoma, a US town
- Alderson, West Virginia, a US town
- Alderson Federal Prison Camp
- Alderson, Alberta, a ghost town in Canada

== Other uses ==
- Alderson (surname)

== People ==
- Charles Alderson, linguist

== See also ==
- Alderson drive, a fictional interstellar transport drive
- Alderson disk, a fictional artificial astronomical megastructure
