= Sarah Mercer =

British linguist, researcher, and academic

Sarah Jane Mercer
- Born: 24 August 1974 (age 52); Bolton, United Kingdom
- Occupations: Linguist, academic, researcher
- Known for: Applied linguistics; Psycholinguistics; Complex Dynamic Systems Theory

Academic background
- Education: Royal Holloway, University of London (1992–1996) University of Reading (1999–2002) Lancaster University (2003–2008) University of Roehampton (2017–2020) University of Graz (1998–present)
- Thesis: Exploring EFL Learner Self-Concept (2008)
- Academic advisor: Alan Waters

Academic work
- Discipline: Applied Linguistics; English Language Teaching (ELT) / Foreign Language Education; Psychology of Language Learning and Teaching; Second Language Acquisition (SLA); Educational Psychology
- Sub-discipline: Applied linguistics; Psycholinguistics; Complex Dynamic Systems Theory
- Institutions: University of Graz
- Website: anglistik.uni-graz.at/de/unsere-forschung/fachbereiche/fachdidaktik/

Sarah Jane Mercer (born 24 August 1974) is a British linguist and Professor of Foreign Language Teaching at the University of Graz, Austria. She is currently Head of the ELT Methodology Department and Head of the Department of English.

Her research focuses on the psychology of language learning and teaching, particularly learner engagement, agency, affect, belief systems, and wellbeing. She employs primarily qualitative research approaches, with a particular interest in dynamic systems and ecological theory. Her current research explores teacher psychology, pre-service teacher identity development, socio-emotional intelligence, positive language education, as well as interdisciplinary approaches to self.

== Career ==
Mercer attended the Bolton School Girl's Division, Lancashire, United Kingdom. She obtained a Bachelor of Arts in European Studies (French, German & Politics) at Royal Holloway, University of London. She received a Master of Arts in Teaching English as a Foreign Language (TEFL) at the University of Reading and a Doctor of Philosophy in Applied Linguistics at Lancaster University. Between 2017 and 2020, Mercer completed a Master of Science in Psychology at the University of Roehampton in London. The programme was accredited by the British Psychological Society (BPS).

From 1998 to 2015, Mercer worked as a lecturer at the University of Graz, where she was appointed Professor of Foreign Language Teaching in 2015. In 2013, she became a co-editor of the academic journal System. Between 2012 and 2018, she served as Deputy Head of the Centre for Teaching and Learning at the University of Graz. From 2015 to 2017, she was joint coordinator of the Research Special Interest Group (SIG) of the International Association of Teachers of English as a Foreign Language (IATEFL).

In 2012, Mercer completed her habilitation at the University of Graz with a thesis entitled Emerging Complexity in Language Learning Psychology.

Currently, Mercer holds several academic and administrative positions at the University of Graz, including Professor of Foreign Language Teaching, Head of the ELT Methodology Department, and Head of the Institute for English Studies. She also leads the university's Research Network for Subject Didactics (Forschungsnetzwerk Fachdidaktik) and its doctoral programme in language teaching research. Beyond the university, she serves on the Oxford University Press ELT Expert Panel and was listed as President-Elect of the International Association for the Psychology of Language Learning (IAPLL).

== Research ==
In 2011 Towards an Understanding of Language Learner Self-Concept was published by Springer Publishing. In this book, Mercer investigates the nature and development of language and learner self-concept. The book provides a deep insights into how learners view themselves, and how these self-beliefs can develop and affect the progress of an individual's language learning process.

In her most-cited journal article entitled Language learner self-concept: Complexity, continuity and change, published in System in 2011, Mercer investigated the nature and dynamics of self-concept in language learning. She found that self-concept is perhaps best conceived of as a complex, multilayered, multidimensional network of interrelated self-beliefs.

== Publications ==
Mercer has published in several major journals such as System, The Modern Language Journal, TESOL Quarterly, ELT Journal, Studies in Second Language Learning and Teaching and Language Learning Journal.

== Selected published works ==
=== Books ===
- Vaupetitsch, R., Campbell, N., Mercer, S. Reitbauer, M. & Schumm, J. (Eds.) (2009). The Materials Generator: Developing Innovative Materials for Advanced Language Production. Frankfurt: Peter Lang.
- Mercer, S. (2011). Towards an Understanding of Language Learner Self-Concept. Dordrecht: Springer.
- Mercer, S., Ryan, S. & Williams, M. (2015). Exploring Psychology in Language Learning and Teaching. Oxford Handbooks for Language Teachers. Oxford: Oxford University Press.
- Mercer, S. & Kostoulas, A. (Eds.) (2017). Teacher Psychology in SLA. Bristol: Multilingual Matters.
- Mercer, S. & Dörnyei, Z. (2020). Engaging Language Learners in Contemporary Classrooms. Cambridge: Cambridge University Press.

=== Articles ===
- Mercer, S. (2008). Key concepts in ELT: Learner self-beliefs. ELT Journal 62(2): 182–183. doi:
- Mercer, S. & Ryan, S. (2010). A mindset for EFL: Learners' beliefs about the role of natural talent. ELT Journal 64(4): 436–444. doi:
- Mercer, S. (2011). The beliefs of two expert EFL learners. Language Learning Journal 39(1): 57 - 74.
- Mercer, S. (2011). The self as a complex dynamic system. Studies in Second Language Learning and Teaching 1(1): 57–82. doi:
- Mercer, S. (2011). Understanding learner agency as a complex dynamic system. System 39(4): 427–436. doi:
- Mercer, S. (2011). Language learner self-concept: Complexity, continuity and change. System 39(3): 335–346. doi:
- Mercer, S. (2012). Dispelling the myth of the natural-born linguist. ELT Journal 66(1): 22 - 29.
- Kostoulas, A. & Mercer, S. (2016). Fifteen years of research on self and identity in System. System, 1–7. doi:
- Mercer, S., Glatz, M., Glettler, C., Lämmerer, A., Mairitsch, A., Puntschuh, S., Seidl, E., Tezak, K. & Turker, S. (2017). Moving between worlds: Teaching-based PhD identities from an ecological perspective. Journal of Adult Learning, Knowledge and Innovation.
- Kostoulas, A., Stelma, J., Mercer, S., Cameron, L. & Dawson, S. (2017). Complex systems theory as a shared discourse space for TESOL. TESOL Journal 9(2), 246–260. doi:
- Mercer, S. (2017). Positive psychology in SLA: An agenda for teacher and learner wellbeing. Australian Review of Applied Linguistics, 40(2), 100–122.
- Irie, K., Ryan, S., & Mercer, S. (2018). Using Q methodology to investigate pre-service EFL teachers’ mindsets about teaching competences. Studies in Second Language Learning and Teaching, 8(3), 575–598.
- Talbot, K., & Mercer, S. (2019). Exploring University ESL/EFL Teachers’ Emotional Well-being and Emotional Regulation in the United States, Japan and Austria. Chinese Journal of Applied Linguistics, 41(4), 410–432.
- MacIntyre, P., Gregersen, T., & Mercer, S. (2019). Setting an agenda for Positive Psychology in SLA: Theory, practice and research. The Modern Language Journal, 103(1), 262–274. doi:
- MacIntyre, P., Ross, J., Talbot, K., Mercer, S., Gregersen, T., & Banga, C.-A. (2019). Stressors, personality and wellbeing among language teachers. System, 82, 26–38.
