= DIALANG =

DIALANG is an online diagnostic system designed to assess a person's proficiency in 14 European languages. Competences tested are reading, writing, listening, grammar and vocabulary, while speaking is excluded for technical reasons.

DIALANG was designed primarily for European citizens to assess their language abilities in adherence to Europe's Common European Framework of Reference – CEFR – as a basis for determining language proficiency. The CEFR is a widely recognized framework used to describe and measure the language proficiency level of a learner in a particular language.

Dialang was funded by the SOCRATES programme and by some 25 institutions, largely universities, throughout the European Union. Dialang is explained in the Appendix C, pages 226-243 of the CEFR official document.

== Fourteen languages ==
The current version of DIALANG provides tests in Danish, Dutch, English, Finnish, French, German, Greek, Italian, Portuguese, Spanish, Swedish, Irish, Icelandic, and Norwegian. It is a web-based project, and the system can be downloaded from its website free of charge. Users must have an Internet connection in order to use the software.

DIALANG offers separate test for reading, writing, listening, grammatical structures and vocabulary. DIALANG provides test instructions, controls, help pages, explanations, self-assessment statements, test results, feedback and advice in all 14 languages.

These tests enable the users to become aware of their strengths and weaknesses. The tests are offered across a wide range of proficiency levels from beginners to advanced. Due to the limitations of the test design, DIALANG has not yet developed effective methods to test speaking and writing. Users should note that DIALANG uses an indirect approach to assess written tasks: many writing tasks in DIALANG resemble reading, vocabulary or grammar tasks. Users are given the opportunity to write to complete some tasks; however, they may be limited to just a few words.

== Purpose ==
DIALANG is not intended to be used for certification purposes. It is not designed to certify language proficiency. The purpose of DIALANG is to offer information regarding a test taker's strengths and weaknesses in a language. DIALANG suggest that its system will be most valuable to teachers, language teaching institutions, institutions running independent language learning schemes, and in institutions interested in promoting language proficiency among their staff.

DIALANG is intended for any foreign language learner. DIALANG can assess language proficiency of those formally trained in language classes and those trained informally. DIALANG suggests that its unique feature of offering test in 14 languages could be particularly suitable to the diverse second language learners in Canada (Zhang & Thompson 2004).

There are no age restrictions for DIALANG test-takers. Yet, it is important to recognize that the tasks written and designed by DIALANG deal with issues that may not be appealing to young learners. Also, participants whose L1 is not among the 14 languages listed and who are not proficient enough in any of these languages may not be able to understand the instructions or the statements in the self-assessment questionnaire.

By simplifying the language of instruction, DIALANG could be made accessible to a wider range of users (Zhang & Thompson 2004).
