= Wander Lowie =

Dutch linguist

Wander Marius Lowie
- Born: 14 October 1959 (age 67); Amsterdam, Netherlands
- Education: Leiden University
- Known for: Second language acquisition; Complex Dynamic Systems Theory
- Scientific career
- Fields: Second language acquisition; Complex Dynamic Systems Theory
- Workplaces: University of Groningen
- Thesis: The acquisition of interlanguage morphology: a study into the role of morphology in the L2 learner's mental lexicon (1998)
- Doctoral advisor: Kees de Bot
- Website: Lowie on the website of the University of Groningen

Wander Marius Lowie (born 14 October 1959) is a Dutch linguist. He is currently a professor of applied linguistics at the Department of Applied Linguistics at the University of Groningen, Netherlands. He is known for his work on Complex Dynamic Systems Theory.

He is one of the members of the "Dutch School of Dynamic Systems" who proposed to apply time-series data to study second language development along with de Bot, van Geert, and Verspoor.

== Career ==
Lowie obtained his PhD degree at the Centre of Language and Cognition, Faculty of Arts at the University of Groningen on 14 January 1998. He was supervised by his future colleague at the University of Groningen, Cornelis de Bot. The title of his PhD thesis was "The acquisition of interlanguage morphology: a study into the role of morphology in the L2 learner's mental lexicon".

Lowie is the Associate Editor of The Modern Language Journal, a peer-reviewed academic journal.

== Research ==
In 2004 he wrote a seminal article along with de Bot and Verspoor on second language development in which he applied the dynamic systems theory to study second language writing development. This was the first research paper in which time-series data were used to explicate changes in the development of second language writing.

In a 2012 article he discussed the pedagogical implications of Dynamic Systems Theory approaches to second language development. He suggested that only an approach that values the relevance of variability can capture the crucial time dimension of development. He proposed that a longitudinal approach using a language portfolio that captures a wide range of language skills as suggested by the Common European Framework of Reference is of greater value for the language learner than a rigid assessment of some aspects of language proficiency at one point in time.

== Bibliography ==
=== Books ===
- Second Language Acquisition: An Advanced Resource Book (2005)
- A Dynamic Approach to Second Language Development. Methods and Techniques (2011)
- Usage-based Dynamics in Second Language Development (2020)

=== Articles ===
- "Making sense of polysemous words." (2003)
- "Dynamic Systems Theory and Applied Linguistics: the ultimate “so what”?" (2005)
- "A dynamic systems theory approach to second language acquisition." (2007)
- "Substitution of dental fricatives in English by Dutch L2 speakers." (2007)
- "Variability in second language development from a dynamic systems perspective." (2008)
- "Input and second language development from a dynamic perspective." (2009)
- "Dynamic Systems Theory as a comprehensive theory of second language development." (2013)
- "Variability and variation in second language acquisition orders: A dynamic reevaluation." (2015)
- "Emergentism: Wide Ranging Theoretical Framework or Just One More Meta-theory?" (2017)
- "Lost in State Space?: Methodological Considerations in Complex Dynamic Theory Approaches to Second Language Development Research" (2017)
