= Assessing Writing =

- Discipline: Second language writing
- Language: English
- Edited by: Martin East, David Slomp

Publication details
- History: 1994–present
- Publisher: Elsevier
- Frequency: Quarterly
- Impact factor: 1.906

Standard abbreviations
- ISO 4: Assess. Writ.

Indexing
- ISSN: 1075-2935

Links
- Journal homepage

Assessing Writing is a quarterly peer-reviewed academic journal covering the assessment of written language in language education. It was established in 1994, and is published by Elsevier. The editor-in-chief are Martin East and David Slomp.

== Abstracting and indexing ==
The journal is abstracted and indexed in:

- Contents Pages in Education
- Educational Research Abstracts Online
- ERIC
- Education Research Index
- Education Technology Abstracts
- Linguistics Abstracts Online
- Linguistics and Language Behavior Abstracts
- MLA International Bibliography
- Research into Higher Education Abstracts
- Scopus
- Sociology of Education Abstracts
- Technical Education & Training Abstracts
