= Language Testing =

- Discipline: Language education
- Language: English
- Edited by: Talia Isaacs, Xun Yan

Publication details
- History: 1984-present
- Publisher: SAGE Publishing
- Frequency: Quarterly
- Impact factor: 1.154 (2018)

Standard abbreviations
- ISO 4: Lang. Test.

Indexing
- ISSN: 0265-5322 (print); 1477-0946 (web)
- LCCN: 89645730
- OCLC no.: 263607215

Links
- Journal homepage; Online access; Online archive

Language Testing is a quarterly peer-reviewed academic journal covering language testing and assessment. Its editors-in-chief are Talia Isaacs (University College London) and Xun Yan (University of Illinois Urbana-Champaign). It was established in 1984 and is published by SAGE Publications.

== Abstracting and indexing ==
The journal is abstracted and indexed in:

- Arts and Humanities Citation Index
- EBSCO databases
- International Bibliography of Periodical Literature
- Modern Language Association Database
- ProQuest databases
- PsycINFO
- Scopus
- Social Sciences Citation Index

According to the Journal Citation Reports, its 2022 impact factor is 4.1, ranking it 11th out of 194 journals in the category "Linguistics".

== See also ==
- List of applied linguistics journals
