= Kees de Bot =

Dutch linguist

Cornelis Bot
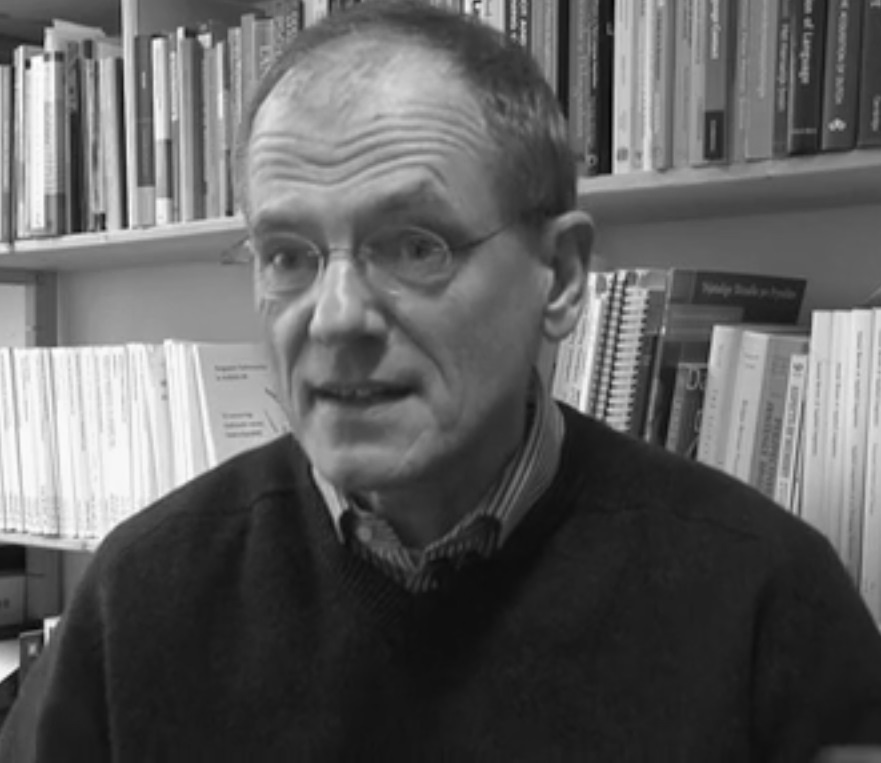
- Bot in 2009
- Born: 11 March 1951 (age 75); Rotterdam, South Holland, The Netherlands
- Education: University of Nijmegen (PhD)
- Known for: Second language acquisition; Bilingualism; Complex Dynamic Systems Theory
- Spouse: Marjolijn Verspoor
- Scientific career
- Fields: Second language acquisition; Bilingualism; Complex Dynamic Systems Theory
- Workplaces: University of Groningen; University of Pannonia
- Thesis: Visuele Feedback van Intonatie (1982)
- Doctoral students: Wander Lowie (1998)
- Website: de Bot on the website of the University of Groningen

Cornelis Kees de Bot (born 11 March 1951) is a Dutch linguist. He is currently the chair of applied linguistics at the University of Groningen, Netherlands, and at the University of Pannonia. He is known for his work on second language development and the use of dynamical systems theory to study second language development.

== Career ==
De Bot obtained his PhD in general linguistics and applied linguistics in 1982 at the University of Nijmegen. His PhD research concerned the use of visualizations of intonation as a teaching aid.

In May 1994, he became chair of Applied Linguistics and head of department at the University of Nijmegen. In November 2002, he became chair of Applied Linguistics at the University of Groningen. He is a trustee of the TESOL International Research Foundation and a member of the Program Committee of the Department of Modern Languages of Carnegie Mellon University.

He is co-editor of a series Studies in Bilingualism from John Benjamins Publishing Company. He has published books and articles in the field of applied linguistics. He is chair of the board of the School of Behavioral and Cognitive Neurosciences in Groningen. He recently acted as guest editor of a special issue on language attrition.of the journal Studies in Bilingualism

He is an associate editor of The Modern Language Journal, a peer-reviewed academic journal.

== Research ==
He is one of the members of the "Dutch School of Dynamic Systems" who proposed to apply time-series data to study second language development along with van Geert, Lowie, and Verspoor. His research concerns a number of topics including foreign language attrition, language and dementia in multilingual settings, maintenance and shift of minority languages and the psycholinguistics of bilingual language processing, and more recently the application of dynamic systems theory in SLA and multilingualism.

In 2015, Bot published his first article on circadian rhythms and second language development, followed by another co-authored article (Fang Fang) in 2017.

== Works ==
In 2004, he wrote a seminal article along with Lowie and Verspoor on second language development which applied the dynamic systems theory to study second language writing development. This was the first research paper in which time-series data were used to explicate changes in the development of second language writing.

In an interview, published in Alkalmazott Nyelvtudomány, (Applied linguistics in Hungarian) de Bot said that he is in interested in the application of circadian rhythm in second language acquisition.

== Supervision ==
de Bot has supervised numerous PhD students, including Wander Lowie, Tal Caspi, and Belinda Chan.

== Awards ==
- Order of Orange-Nassau

== Bibliography ==
=== Books ===
- Second Language Acquisition: An Advanced Resource Book (2005)
- Language Development Over the Lifespan (2009)
- A Dynamic Approach to Second Language Development. Methods and Techniques (2011)
- A History of Applied Linguistics From 1980 to the Present (2015)

=== Articles ===
- "Word production and the bilingual lexicon." (1993)
- "The psycholinguistics of the output hypothesis." (1996)
- "Toward a lexical processing model for the study of second language vocabulary acquisition: Evidence from ESL reading." (1997)
- "Producing words in a foreign language: Can speakers prevent interference from their first language?" (1998)
- "A bilingual production model: Levelt’s “speaking” model adapted." (2000)
- "The multilingual lexicon: Modelling selection and control." (2004)
- "Complex systems and applied linguistics." (2007)
- "A dynamic systems theory approach to second language acquisition." (2007)
- "An identity approach to second language acquisition." (2011)
- "First language attrition." (2013)
