= System (journal) =

- Discipline: Applied linguistics, education
- Language: English
- Edited by: Mairin Hennebry-Leung, Chun Lai, Jim McKinley, Yongyan Zheng

Publication details
- History: 1973-present
- Publisher: Elsevier
- Frequency: 8/year
- Open access: Hybrid
- Impact factor: 8.0 (2025)

Standard abbreviations
- ISO 4: System

Indexing
- ISSN: 0346-251X
- LCCN: 81643610
- OCLC no.: 833467391

Links
- Journal homepage; Online archive

System is a peer-reviewed academic journal covering the applications of educational technology and applied linguistics to problems of foreign language teaching and learning. It was established in 1973 and has been published by Elsevier since 1991. Until 2013, the journal published four issues per year. In 2014, it published six issues, and since 2015 it has published eight issues per year. Since October 2019 (volume 85), articles have been published electronically only.

== Abstracting, indexing, and ranking ==
The journal is abstracted and indexed in:

- EBSCO databases
- International Bibliography of Periodical Literature
- Modern Language Association Database
- Scopus
- Social Sciences Citation Index

According to the Journal Citation Reports, the journal had a 2025 impact factor of 8.0, ranking it 5th out of 312 journals in the category "Linguistics" and 16th out of 762 journals in the category "Education".

== Editors ==
As of January 2026, the editors-in-chief are Mairin Hennebry-Leung (University of Melbourne), Chun Lai (University of Hong Kong), Jim McKinley (University College London), and Yongyan Zheng (Fudan University).

=== Former editors ===
Former editors of the journal include:

| Editor | Affiliation | Term |
|---|---|---|
| Norman Davies | Linköping University | 1973–2010 |
| James A. Coleman | Open University | 2010–2013 |
| Lluïsa Astruc | Open University | 2013–2017 |
| Sarah Mercer | University of Graz | 2013–2017 |
| Xuesong (Andy) Gao | University of New South Wales | 2014–2021 |
| Ursula Stickler | Open University | 2014–2019 |
| Lawrence Jun Zhang | University of Auckland | 2016–2024 |
| Marta González-Lloret | University of Hawaiʻi at Mānoa | 2017–2021 |
| Idoia Elola | Texas Tech University | 2020–2025 |

=== Associate editors ===
At different points in its history, System has appointed associate editors with responsibility for handling manuscript submissions and peer review, a role commensurate with journal editor leadership. From 2010 to 2013, James A. Coleman served as editor-in-chief with Lluïsa Astruc, Regine Hampel and, during 2013, Xuesong (Andy) Gao serving as associate editors. Following Coleman's departure, the journal adopted a co-editor structure without a separate associate-editor tier. The associate-editor role was later reintroduced as the journal's editorial structure expanded. Several associate editors, including Idoia Elola, Yongyan Zheng and Chun Lai, later became editors-in-chief.

| Associate editor | Term |
|---|---|
| Lluïsa Astruc | 2011–2013 |
| Regine Hampel | 2011–2013 |
| Xuesong (Andy) Gao | 2013 |
| Idoia Elola | 2019–2020 |
| Yongyan Zheng | 2021 |
| Vincent Greenier | 2022–2025 |
| Nathan Thomas | 2023–present |
| M. Camino Bueno-Alastuey | 2024–present |
| Xuesong (Andy) Gao | 2024–present |
| Chun Lai | 2024–2025 |
| Phil Hiver | 2025 |
| Suhad Sonbul | 2025–present |
| Phung Dao | 2025–present |
| Meagan Driver | 2026–present |
| Joseph P. Vitta | 2026–present |

=== Student Editorial Board ===
System established a Student Editorial Board in 2022, led by 'Student Editor', Nathan Thomas, to provide doctoral students with experience of editorial work, including manuscript reviewing and editorial decision-making under the guidance of the journal's editors. The board continues as part of the journal's editorial structure.

=== Book review editors ===
The journal has had a dedicated book review editor since 1977.

| Editor | Affiliation | Term |
|---|---|---|
| Udo O. H. Jung | University of Marburg; University of Bayreuth | 1977–1996 |
| David Little | Trinity College Dublin | 1996–2000 |
| Robert Vanderplank | University of Oxford | 2001–2016 |
| Jim McKinley | University College London | 2017–2019 |
| Vincent Greenier | University of Aberdeen | 2019-2022 |
| Pascal Matzler | Pontifical Catholic University of Valparaíso | 2022–2026 |
| Kari Sahan | University of Oxford | 2026–present |

== See also ==
- List of linguistics journals
- List of education journals
