= The Modern Language Journal =

- Discipline: Linguistics, education
- Language: English
- Edited by: Marta Antón; Shawn Loewen

Publication details
- History: 1916-present
- Publisher: Wiley-Blackwell on behalf of the National Federation of Modern Language Teachers Associations (United States)
- Frequency: Quarterly
- Impact factor: 7.500 (2022)

Standard abbreviations
- ISO 4: Mod. Lang. J.

Indexing
- ISSN: 0026-7902 (print); 1540-4781 (web)
- LCCN: 37024312
- JSTOR: 00267902
- OCLC no.: 615546163

Links
- Journal homepage; Journal page at publisher's website; Online access

The Modern Language Journal is a peer-reviewed academic journal published by Wiley-Blackwell on behalf of the National Federation of Modern Language Teachers Associations. It covers research and discussion about the learning and teaching of foreign and second languages.

Types of articles published include documented essays, research studies using quantitative/qualitative methodologies, response articles, and editorials that challenge paradigms of language learning and teaching. The journal has a News & Notes of the Profession section offering a calendar of events, professional announcements, initiatives, and concerns. The journal also provides a list of relevant articles in other professional journals, and reviews of scholarly books, monographs, and computer software. An annual survey of doctoral degrees granted in foreign languages, literatures, cultures, linguistics, and foreign language education in the United States is available on the journal's website.

Since 2007, the journal issues a fifth issue in addition to the regular four issues published every year. This additional issue is a focus issue or a monograph in alternating years.

According to the Journal Citation Reports, the journal has a 2022 impact factor of 7.500.

== Editorial board ==
- Editor-in-Chief: Marta Antón
- Associate Editor: Shawn Loewen
- Associate Editor: Wander Lowie
- Associate Editor: Martha Bigelow

=== Board ===
- Teresa Cadierno
- Laura Collins
- Kees de Bot
- Patricia Duff
- Agnes He
- Elaine K. Horwitz
- Richard Kern
- James Lantolf
- Jenifer Larson-Hall
- Constant Leung
- Peter MacIntyre
- Junko Mori
- Rosa Manchón
- Tim McNamara
- Rebecca Oxford
- Angela Scarino
- Merrill Swain
- Naoko Taguchi
- Elaine Tarone
- Paul Toth
- Ema Ushioda
- Guadalupe Valdés
- Paula Winke

== See also ==
- List of linguistics journals
