= Global Work & Travel =

Australian travel company

- Type: Private
- Industry: Travel; Volunteer work Gap year
- Founded: September 2008; 17 years ago in Gold Coast, Queensland
- Founders: Jürgen Himmelmann, CEO; Pierre Himmelmann, CFO
- Headquarters: 50 Cavill Avenue, Surfers Paradise, Queensland, Australia
- Area served: Australia; Canada; New Zealand; United Kingdom; United States
- Number of employees: 100+ (2019)
- Parent: The Global Work & Travel Group Pty Ltd
- Website: www.globalworkandtravel.com

Global Work & Travel is an Australian travel company. The company was founded in 2008, and provides working holiday, teaching abroad, volunteer, au pair, and student internship packages and helps travellers with travel insurance, flights, and travel visas. With three offices in Surfers Paradise, Vancouver and London, it operates primarily in five countries: Australia, Canada, New Zealand, the United Kingdom, and the United States. As of 2018, the company had organised gap-year trips for over 40,000 people.

A joint investigation by CBC News and the Australian Broadcasting Corporation found several dozen complaints from customers of Global Work & Travel who could not find employment through the company's programs. The Queensland Department of Justice and Attorney-General's Office of Fair Trading (OFT) conducted a 13-month probe that resulted in a $20,000 settlement to pay back 29 customers, while Queensland's Office of Industrial Relations (OIR) levied another fine and reached a separate agreement to pay back the remaining customers.

== History ==
Global Work & Travel was founded in 2008 by father and son duo Pierre and Jürgen Himmelmann. They and Jürgen's mother Caryl Himmelmann own the company. Based in Surfers Paradise, Queensland, it has offices in Vancouver and London.

Global Work & Travel offers working holiday, au pair, internship, volunteer and teaching abroad packages for people between the ages of 18 and 35. It helps travellers with flights, travel visas, and travel insurance. It provides services primarily in five countries: Australia, Canada, New Zealand, the United Kingdom, and the United States. Trips can last up to 24 months, depending on arrival countries visa specifications. In 2015, it had 100 employees and served over 20,000 travellers, by 2018 it had served over 40,000.

== Criticism and controversy ==
In November 2014, the company was investigated jointly by CBC News and Australian Broadcasting Corporation, which found several dozen accusations from consumers who travelled internationally and were unable to find employment. The travellers described Global Work & Travel's high-pressure sales techniques, misleading job pledges, and massive markups. Global Work & Travel settled with OFT after a 13-month probe. The company agreed to refund over $20,000 to 29 customers.

In February 2015, the Federal Circuit Court of Australia fined Global Work & Travel and its owners $138,000 for not refunding a prior agreed upon sum to six workers they had misclassified as independent contractors. Global Work & Travel also was investigated by the Queensland's Office of Industrial Relations (OIR). OIR levied a fine on the company in February 2016 for violations of the Private Employment Agents Act of 2005. The company settled with OIR in March 2016 to have all charges resolved after repayment of all fines.

== See also ==
- Cross-Cultural Solutions
- International Volunteer HQ
- Global Brigades
- Rotary Youth Exchange
- Volunteers in Africa Foundation
