= Teaching abroad =

Catch-phrase used for teaching outside the teacher's home country

Teaching abroad is a catch phrase used in first world countries for temporary teaching assignments outside of the teacher's home country.

== Overview of different programs ==
There are many different programs that exist to help people teach abroad. If a person knows that they want to teach abroad but they are not sure if they are able to make the transition, they can pick a teaching program that goes from a semester to a couple of years. There are also programs where one can switch positions with a teacher overseas. When picking a program make sure it is a credible program. Three often-used paths for American teachers are teaching at a Department of Defense school, teaching at an international school, or working independently at any school accepting foreign applicants.

== U.S. Department of Defense ==
Teaching at a U.S. Department of Defense (DOD) school is much like teaching at a school within the United States. The schools enroll the children of military and DOD civilian employees. There are currently 222 public schools in "13 foreign countries, seven states, Guam, and Puerto Rico" (DOD). There are 8,785 teachers working in these schools. The DOD works to keep the school atmosphere and level of learning comparable to schools within the U.S.

The DOD hires only teachers with bachelor's degrees (which must include some course work in education) and teaching experience. Most placements are for one or two years; teachers are placed at the discretion of the DoD and cannot choose their location.

== International volunteer programs ==
Numerous volunteer programs exist in which teachers can teach in foreign schools. Costs to participate as a volunteer vary depending on the organization, the country and the length of the program. International volunteer programs usually vary in length from 2 to 12 months. Volunteers most often teach English but other subjects can also be covered, such as computer skills, AIDS/HIV awareness, science, math, etc.

Volunteer English teaching programs exist in almost all corners of the world. Some countries with prominent English teaching programs are Chile, Spain, France, and Georgia. Many programs are sponsored by the host nation's ministry of education, such as Chile's English Opens Doors and Korea's EPIK program.

== International schools ==
International schools are private schools that cater mainly to children who are not nationals of the host country, including the children of the staff of international businesses, international organizations, foreign embassies, missions, or missionary programs. Teachers are often hired on contracts that typically last two years Research has indicated that teaching experiences abroad contribute positively to the intercultural development of teachers (Savva, 2013).

== TESOL Certification ==
Many teaching positions overseas are for teachers of English and can involve teaching to all ages, including both children and adults. Programs are organized by individual schools, national governments (such as the JET Programme in Japan and English Opens Doors in Chile).

The University of Missouri-Saint Louis, like many schools, have required their education majors to either pick TESOL or special education to major in for more specificity. This university, in particular, wants teachers to be more well rounded for future employers. Some programs require teaching credentials and/or TESOL certification.

Thousands of people every year choose to do a short course in TESOL or TEFL, and while there is some dispute about the claimed usefulness of brief courses (TEFL, TESOL, etc.) in becoming an effective teacher, after this short course, most employers in almost every country accept that the teacher has qualified and is able to teach English. There are jobs in almost every country for teachers who have done these short TEFL or TESOL courses, and most countries like Taiwan, Vietnam, South Korea, Thailand, and especially China struggle to find teacher to fill teaching positions. Many English language schools and companies in China, in recent years, have moved to a strategy more adaptive to this market pressure, and have started employing thousands of teachers around the globe to teach through online teaching, giving quick rise to the new industry of online teachers.

== See also ==
- List of international schools
- International school
- International volunteering
