= GBB =

GBB may refer to:

- Greenbottle blue tarantula, a spider from Venezuela
- Bourbon (group), a French shipping company
- Ghar Banduk Biryani, a 2023 Marathi film
- Genes, Brain and Behavior, a scholarly journal
- Georgia Brass Band, an American band
- Global Aviation, a South African airline
- Global Business Brigades, an international development organization
- Grand Beatbox Battle, a yearly worldwide beatbox competition
- Kaytetye language
- Qabala International Airport, in Azerbaijan
