= GYSO =

GYSO may refer to:

- Georgia Youth Symphony Orchestra
- Greek Youth Symphony Orchestra
- Guangzhou Symphony Youth Orchestra
- Guiyang Symphony Orchestra
