= Scott Thornbury =

New Zealand academic

Scott Thornbury (born 1950 in New Zealand) is an internationally recognized academic and teacher trainer in the field of English Language Teaching (ELT). Along with Luke Meddings, Thornbury is credited with developing the Dogme language teaching approach, which emphasizes meaningful interaction and emergent language over prepared materials and following an explicit syllabus. Thornbury has written over a dozen books on ELT methodology. Two of these, 'Natural Grammar' and 'Teaching Unplugged', have won the British Council's "ELTon" Award for Innovation, the top award in the industry (in 2004 and 2010, respectively).

Thornbury is also the series editor for the Cambridge Handbooks for Language Teachers, and the author of many academic papers on language teaching. His 'A-Z of ELT' blog is one of the most influential and well-visited blogs in the field of ELT. His approximately 15 textbooks for beginning and intermediate learners have been published by major academic presses, including both Oxford University Press and Cambridge University Press, although his recent stance regarding 'Teaching Unplugged'—also the title of one of his methodology books—is often described as being strongly anti-textbook.

Currently, Thornbury is Associate Professor of English Language Studies at the New School in New York, and Academic Director at the International Teacher Development Institute (iTDi).

== Publications ==
=== Academic books ===
- Thornbury, S. (2019). Scott Thornbury's 101 Grammar Questions. Cambridge: Cambridge University Press.
- Thornbury, S. (2017). Scott Thornbury's 30 Language Teaching Methods. Cambridge: Cambridge University Press.
- Thornbury, S. (2013). Big Questions in ELT. The Round.
- Corbett, J., and Scott Thornbury, S. (2010). Intercultural Language Activities. Cambridge: Cambridge University Press.
- Thornbury, S., & Meddings, L. (2009). Teaching unplugged: Dogme in English Language Teaching. Surrey, England: Delta.
- Thornbury, S., & Watkins, P. A. (2007). The CELTA course: Certificate in English language teaching to adults : trainee book. Cambridge: Cambridge University Press.
- Thornbury, S. (2006). Grammar. Resource books for teachers. Oxford: Oxford University Press. 97 locations in Worldcat
- Thornbury, S., & Slade, D. (2006). Conversation: From description to pedagogy. Cambridge language teaching library. Cambridge: Cambridge University Press . 187 copies listed in WorldCat
  - Review, Friedman, D. " Theory and Practice: Conversation: From Description to Pedagogy by Thornbury, Scott. The Modern Language Journal. 93, no. 1: 124-125, 2009
- Thornbury, S. (2006). An A-Z of ELT: A Dictionary of Terms and Concepts Used in English Language Teaching. Oxford: Macmillan Education..
- Thornbury, S. (2005). Beyond the Sentence: Introducing Discourse Analysis.. Oxford: Macmillan Education, 2005.
- Thornbury, S. (2005). How to teach speaking. Harlow, England: Longman.
- Thornbury, S. (2004). Natural grammar: the keywords of English and how they work. Oxford: Oxford University Press. 97 listings in Worldcat
- Thornbury, S. (2002). How to teach vocabulary. Harlow: Longman.
  - Translated into Chinese, as 如何教词汇 Beijing: World Knowledge Publishing Corporation, 2003. ISBN 978-7-5012-2083-0
- Thornbury, S., and Underhill, A. (2001). Uncovering Grammar. The Teacher Development. Oxford: Macmillan Heinemann English Language Teaching, 2001. ピアソン・エデュケーション, Tokyo : Piason edyukeshon, 2001 ISBN 978-4-89471-854-8
- 新しい英文法の学び方・教え方 / Atarashii eibunpo no manabikata oshiekata (How to learn a new way of English teaching)
- Thornbury, S. (1999). How to teach grammar. Harlow, England: Pearson Education. 282 holdings in WorldCat
- Thornbury, S. (1997). About language: Tasks for teachers of English. Cambridge teacher training and development. Cambridge: Cambridge University Press 272 copies in WorldCat

=== Academic articles ===
- Watching the whites of their eyes: the use of teaching practice logs. English Language Teaching Journal 1991, 45/2: 140-6.
- Metaphors we work by: EFL and its metaphors. English Language Teaching Journal 1991, 45/3: 193-200.
- Having a good jaw: voice-setting phonology. English Language Teaching Journal 1993, 47/2, 126-31.
- Paying lip-service to CLT. EA (ELICOS Association) Journal 1996, 14/1, 51-63.
- "ARC": does it have restricted use? The Teacher Trainer 1996, 10/3, 7-11.
- Teachers research teacher talk. English Language Teaching Journal 1996, 50/4, 279-89
- Reformulation and reconstruction: tasks that promote noticing. English Language Teaching Journal 1997, 51/4, 326-35.
- Grammar, power and bottled water. IATEFL Newsletter, 140, 1998, 19-20. Reprinted in Arena, 19, 1998, 41-43
- Images of teaching. English Teaching Professional, 8, 1998, 36-37
- Comments on Marianne Celce-Murcia, Zoltán Dörnyei, and Sarah Thurrell's "Direct approaches in L2 Instruction: A turning point in communicative language teaching?" A reader reacts.... TESOL Quarterly, 32, 1998, 109-116.
- The Lexical Approach: A journey without maps? Modern English Teacher, 7, 1998, 7-13.
- A language learner's diary. The IH Journal, 5. April 1998, 5-7
- Lesson art and design. English Language Teaching Journal 1999, 53/1, 4-11
- Window-dressing vs cross-dressing in the EFL sub-culture. Folio 1999, 5/2, 15-17
- A Dogma for EFL. IATEFL Issues, Issue 153, p. 2, 2000
- Targeting accuracy, fluency and complexity. English Teaching Professional,16, 2000, 3-6
- Under what circumstances do we apply the word "scientific" in language learning? A roundtable. (With Earl Stevick, Roslyn Young, and Robert Nusbaum). Prism: A learning Journal. Vol 5. Spring 2000, 7-138. *Reading and writing as arithmetic. Modern English Teacher, 9/4. October 2000, 12-15.
- Walking while chewing gum: A review. IH Journal, Issue 9, October 2000, 5-7. Also: EA Journal, 18/1, 89-95.
- Teaching unplugged (or: That's Dogme with an E). It's for Teachers, Issue 1. February 2001. 10-14. (re-printed in In English, Autumn, 2002 (British Council, Portugal)).
- Dogme out in the open. IATEFL Issues, 161, June–July 2001, 6 (with Luke Meddings).
- Coursebooks: The Roaring in the Chimney. Modern English Teacher, 10/3. July, 2001, 11-13 (with Luke Meddings).
- Using the raw materials. Modern English Teacher, 10/4. October 2001, 40-43 (with Luke Meddings).
- The unbearable lightness of EFL, and Lighten up: a reply to Angeles Clemente. English Language Teaching Journal, 55/4, 2001, 391-6, 403-4.
- Using a coursebook the Dogme way. Modern English Teacher, 11/1. January 2002, 36 -40 (with Luke Meddings).
- Don't mention the war! Taboo topics and the alternative textbook. It's for Teachers, Issue 3. February 2002. 35-37.
- Who's afraid of Virginia Woolf? The Teacher, 2. 2002. (Poland), 12-13. *Becoming a teacher. Special edition IATEFL Teacher Development & Teacher Trainers & Educators Special Interest Groups Newsletter, Summer 2002, 8-9.
- Teaching complexity. In Aspectos Didácticos de Inglés, 8. 2002, Instituto de Ciencias de la Educación, Universidad de Zaragoza. 67-76. *Training in instructional conversation. In Trappes-Lomax, H., and Ferguson, G. (Eds.) 2002. Language in Language Teacher Education. Amsterdam: John Benjamins, 95-106.
- Materials-free teaching. English Teaching Professional, 26, 2003, 57-59 (with Nerina Conte)
- Catalan for beginners: A learner's account. IH Journal, Spring, 2003, 19-23.
- Big words, small grammar. English Teaching Professional. Issue 31, March, 2004, 10-11
- Grammar. English Teaching Professional. Issue 32, May, 2004. 40-41.
- Dogme: Dancing in the dark? Folio. 9/2, January 2005, 3-5.Speaking to learn. In Foley, J.A. (Ed.) 2005 New Dimensions in the Teaching of Oral Communication (Anthology Series 47) Singapore: SEAMEO Regional Language Centre, 127-143
- Awareness, Appropriation and Autonomy. English Teaching Professional. Issue 40, September 2005, 11-13.
- Language Awareness: Discourse. In Macmillan English Dictionary (New edition), 2007
- Language as an emergent system. In English. British Council: Spring/Summer 2008.
- What good is SLA theory? English Teaching Professional. Issue 55, March, 2008.
- Slow-release grammar. English Teaching Professional. Issue 61, March 2009
- Why is English grammar so difficult (not)? Braz-Tesol Newsletter, December 2009
- What can a corpus tell us about discourse? In O'Keeffe A., & McCarthy, M. 2010. (eds.) The Routledge Handbook of Corpus Linguistics. London: Routledge.
- The Grammar of Conversation. In Cook, G., & North, S. (eds.) 2010. Applied Linguistics in Action: A Reader. Milton Keynes: The Open University/Routledge.
- Language Teaching Methodology. In Simpson, J. (ed.) 2011. The Routledge Handbook of Applied Linguistics. London: Routledge.
- Speaking Instruction. In Burns, A. & Richards, J. (eds.) 2011. The Cambridge Guide to Pedagogy and Practice in Language Teaching. Cambridge: Cambridge University Press.

== School textbooks ==
He has also published many school textbooks (and their associated workbooks and teachers' guides), mostly for Pearson Longman.
