= Rotary Youth Exchange =

International student exchange program

Rotary Youth Exchange (RYE) is a Rotary International student exchange program for secondary school students. Since 1929, Rotary International has sent young people around the globe to experience new cultures. Currently, about 9,000 students are sponsored by Rotary Clubs every year. Typically, students are sent to another country for a year-long stay, generally living with multiple host families during the year, and are expected to perform daily tasks within the household as well as attend school in the host country. Short-term exchange programs are also quite common. These typically involve direct student exchanges between two families, arranged through Rotary to coincide with major school holiday periods.

== History ==
The Rotary Club of Copenhagen, Denmark initiated the first Rotary exchange in 1927, and the Rotary Club of Nice, France followed suit soon after in 1929. Although exchanges today typically last ten months, the first exchange took place during school vacations for only a couple of weeks. The year-long Rotary Youth Exchange program was created in 1958 in Lake Placid at a Rotary Governors' Assembly. Here, many rules and procedures were established that still exist today. The first year-long exchange conducted by Rotary under this new framework involved a student leaving Scottsbluff, Nebraska, to live in Myrtleford, Australia for 10 months, and two Australians from Myrtleford arriving in Grand Lake, Colorado. In the following years, more and more countries became involved in the program. In 1962, the first exchange involving Japan and Germany was arranged after tense relations between them and other Rotary International Clubs following World War II. Since its conception 90 years ago, the Rotary Youth Exchange program has expanded rapidly, exchanging 9,000 students annually between 80 different nations.

== Vision ==
Through the Rotary Youth Exchange, Rotary International hopes to create a more interconnected and understanding world. One of Rotary's primary goals is to promote peace around the world, and through the Rotary Youth Exchange, it aims to make the world more peaceful. This rationale follows the logic that if a student experiences different cultures and meets people from all around the world, they will become more understanding of foreign people and countries in the future. Rotary expects that this understanding will lead to a more interconnected and peaceful world.

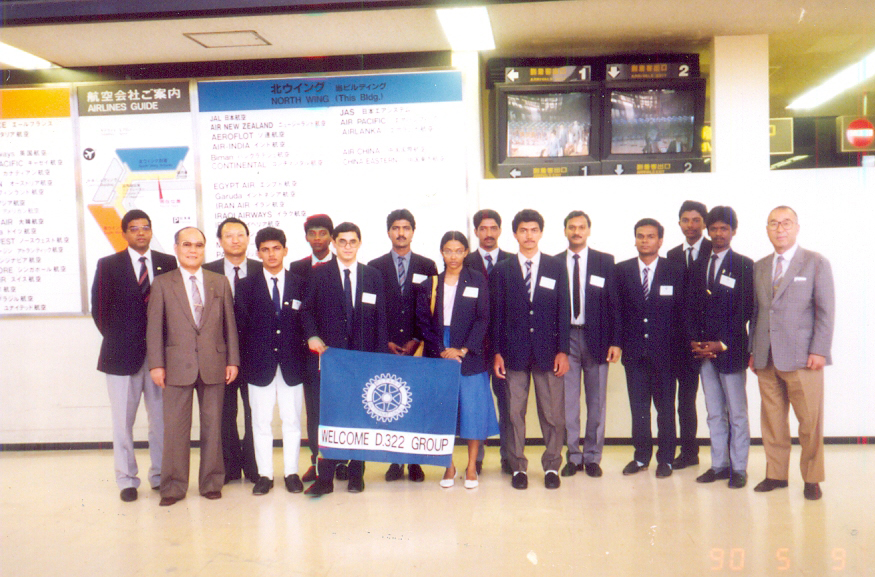
Rotary Youth Exchange Team from Dist 322 India to Dist 262 Japan in Narita Airport, May, 1990.

== Sponsors ==
The Rotarians that participate in the program are volunteers. Many Rotarians are involved in various aspects of the youth exchange program, including student selection, compliance with immigration and Rotary regulations, hosting, and supporting students. A Rotary Club and Rotary District in each student's home country sponsors them, and a Rotary Club and Rotary District in their host country hosts them. Most districts have a chair for the Rotary Youth Exchange program, and some also have committees. Each Rotary Club that hosts a student should provide both a Rotarian youth exchange officer and a Rotarian counsellor for the student. The counsellor is the student's contact person within the club and provides support to the student when needed (this does not always happen). Some districts are very active and host many students, but other districts are less active and host fewer students. Some clubs do not even invite host students to attend weekly meetings, while other clubs will actively encourage the students to attend.

The parent Rotary organization, Rotary International, has instituted a Certification Program that assesses individual RYE programs with a primary focus on quality control and student safety. Rotary groups are not permitted to participate in RYE programs without first obtaining RI Certification.

In 2003, an Australian woman accused the volunteer charity, Rotary, of failing to investigate or adequately respond to her allegations of repeated abuse by a Rotarian who was supposed to be looking after her during her exchange in 1967, when she was 15.

== Events ==
Events for students vary from country to country and district to district, but exchange students may often be able to visit other parts of their host country and sometimes other countries while on exchange with their host families, schools, or Rotary. Many districts organize tours for the students they host, which may include weekend trips to nearby cities, tours of the host country that may last several weeks, and many students in Europe have the opportunity to take part in Euro tours, which visit many countries and last between two and four weeks. However, like most exchange programs, the primary purpose of Rotary Youth Exchange is to provide a cultural and academic exchange, and significant independent travel by students is therefore not allowed.

== Terminology ==
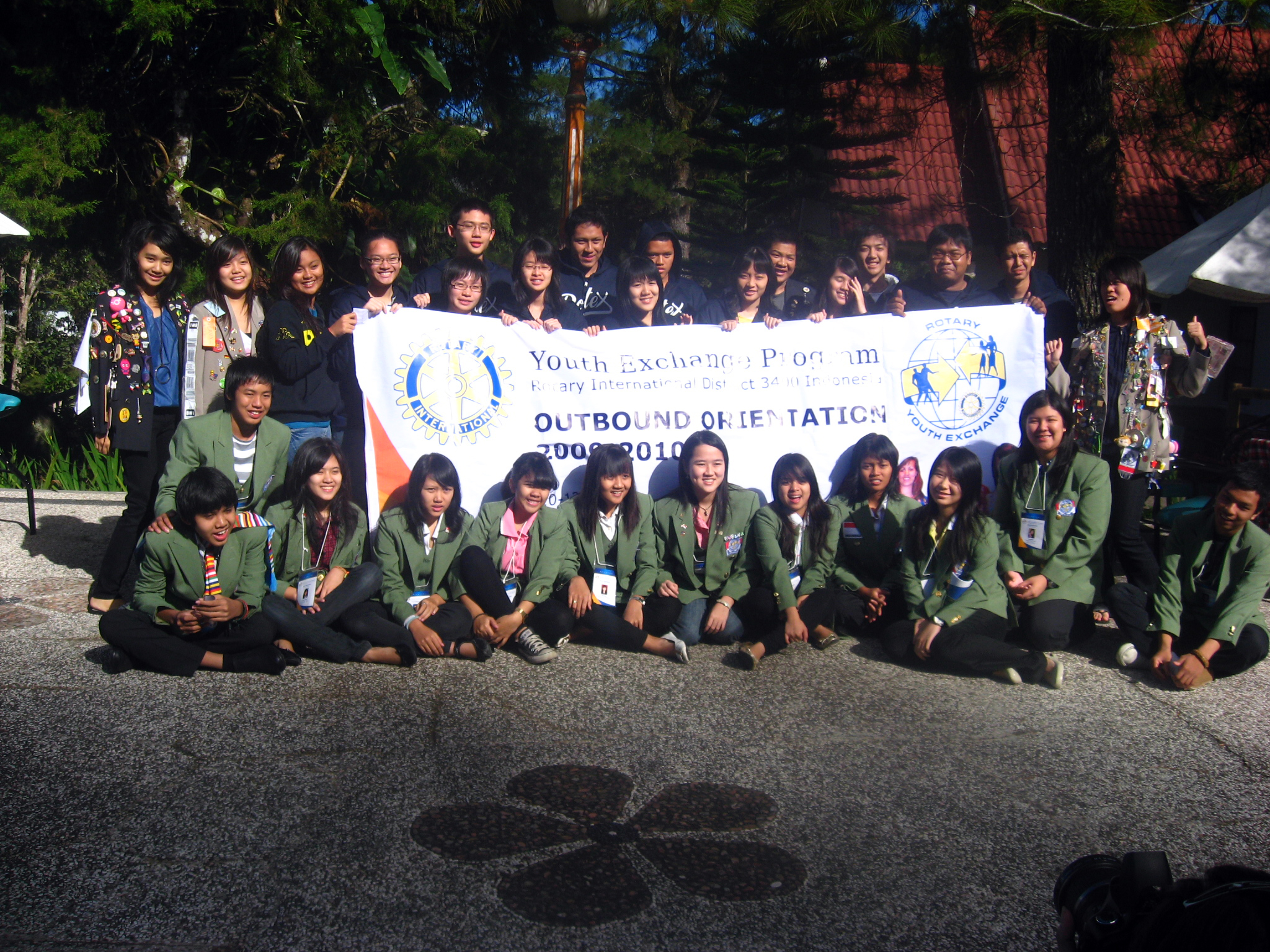
Indonesian Rotary Youth exchange students at orientation. Outbounds are in green blazers and rebounds are in blue.

Exchange students are called "outbounds" by their home (sponsor) Rotary club and district, and simultaneously "inbounds" by their host Rotary club and district in the country they spend their year in. Students who have completed their exchanges are called "rebounds." Rebounds can earn the title of "Rotex" in various ways, depending on their host district. Some districts create requirements for rebounds to complete before becoming Rotex, while others simply allow all rebounds to become Rotex. "Rotex" participates in the organization Rotex for helping exchangers. There is also the rare "yo-yo" student who has been on two exchanges.

Other slang includes the terms "newbies" and "oldies." Due to the arrival of many of the southern hemisphere students in January and the northern hemisphere students in August, there is a group of students that are half a year behind or ahead of that current generation. A student from an older generation is an oldie and students from newer generation are newbies. This half year delay can be helpful in mentoring the newer students into an exchange student's lifestyle.

Another slang word that is used is "Dinosaur", which can refer to one's oldie's oldie. Other terms include "Northie" and "Southie," referring to students from either a northern or southern hemisphere country, respectively, which affects the time period that an exchanger will spend in their host country. A Southie will usually depart either January or February, staying in their host country until the beginning of the next year, while a Northie usually leaves in August or September and stays until the following June or July. This is usually dependent on the students' home country. A student from the United States will almost always leave in August or September and stay until June or July. This can result in back-to-back summers, if a student travels to the southern hemisphere.

== Rules of exchange ==
Rotary is somewhat known for their use of the "Four D's" as a way to protect their students. While abroad, Rotary students cannot drink, drive, date, or use drugs. Being caught doing any of these things is grounds for being sent home. On average, about 300 students are sent home within a year. Within some Rotary districts, there is a fifth "D" to avoid, disfigurement. This rule mainly covers tattoos and piercings, but also carries over to less permanent but still frowned upon practices such as shaving one's head or dying hair unusual colors. Students are also expected to follow the law of the country they will be living in abroad.

== Exchange destinations ==
Of the more than 200 countries affiliated in some way with Rotary International, 80 countries typically participate in the Youth Exchange every year. The countries that participate vary from year to year, but the core members of the program (most notably in North America, Europe, and Asia) are always involved. Even though over 80 countries participate in the program, students do not have the ability to choose any country out of the 80. The Rotary district in which a student lives has a great impact on the countries he/she can go to. Most Rotary districts allow a student to pick various countries of his/her choice from a list of 20 or 30 countries, and there is no guarantee that a student will be sent to one of his/her choices. Some Rotary districts (notably in Japan) will not give prospective students any say in their country selection process. Some exchange destinations have age limitations, so an 18-year-old applicant may not be able to go to as many countries as a 17-year-old applicant.

== Preparing to go abroad ==
Once accepted into the program, it is up to the student to get themselves equipped and ready to go abroad. The responsibilities of the student and their family include the following:

Getting a passport - Students should apply for their passport as soon as they are accepted into the program, as the process may take several weeks.

Student visa and guarantee forms - Students may be required to complete a visa application, and as part of the formal Youth Exchange application, they will be required to complete a guarantee form. Rotarians facilitate the guarantee form process.

Airline tickets - While in many Rotary districts the sponsor club will help purchase the tickets, in some they do not. Students and their families need to be prepared to have to take this responsibility unto themselves.

Health insurance - In many Rotary districts, insurance is included within the exchange fee. However, when it is not, students still need to have travel health insurance before their departure date.

Immunization documentation - Most students are required to have immunization documentation. Local health departments and consular officials can help students determine the required or recommended immunizations for the countries they are traveling to. Students should check with Rotarians from their sponsor club to determine whether additional health documentation will be necessary in the host country.

Dental and medical examinations - Students may need to have a thorough pre-exchange medical and dental examination. The application includes an examination form that must be completed by a health care provider.

== Blazers ==
Today, many Rotary Exchange students can be recognized by their Rotary Youth Exchange blazer. While most countries recommend navy blue, the blazer may also be dark green, red, black, or maroon. The color of the blazer usually depends on which country or region the exchange student is from. One Rotary tradition is that students cover their blazers in pins and patches they have traded with other students or bought in places they have visited as evidence of their exchange.

Blazer colors (for countries with more than one color, the main one is in bold, the other ones are used in some regions):

- Dark Blue
1. **Argentina**
2. Austria
3. Belgium
4. Bermuda
5. Bolivia
6. Brazil
7. Canada
8. Colombia
9. Czech Republic
10. Denmark
11. Ecuador
12. Finland
13. Germany
14. Hungary
15. India
16. Japan
17. Italy
18. Mexico
19. Norway
20. Paraguay
21. Peru
22. Philippines
23. Poland
24. Romania
25. Russia
26. Slovakia
27. Spain
28. South Korea
29. Sweden
30. Taiwan
31. **Thailand**
32. **United States**
33. Lithuania

34. Uganda

- Black
1. Chile
2. New Zealand
3. Turkey
4. Zimbabwe
- Green
1. Australia
2. South Africa
3. United States
4. Taiwan
- Bordeaux
1. Thailand
2. Switzerland
3. United States
- Red
1. **Canada**
- Red Wine
1. Venezuela
- White
1. Argentina
- Light Blue
1. France
2. **Finland**
- Varies by year
1. Indonesia
- Orange
1. Netherlands
- Purple
1. Louisiana (D6840)
2. Mississippi (D6840)

== See also ==
- Cross-Cultural Solutions
- International Volunteer HQ
- Global Work & Travel
- Global Brigades
- Volunteers in Africa Foundation

== External sources ==
Rotary Youth Exchange from Rotary International
Rotary International
