= Volunteers in Africa Foundation =

The Volunteers in Africa Foundation (V.I.A.) is an Oceanside, California-based, grassroots non-profit organization that works to improve education in Southern California and West Africa. Volunteers In Africa’s programs are designed to generate respect and appreciation for our cultural, racial and religious diversity and to also enrich the lives of our neighbors worldwide. In the United States, V.I.A. provides cross-cultural educational experiences for teachers, students and community members. In Africa, V.I.A. provides classroom materials, instructional supplies, volunteers and school construction and improvement.

== See also ==
- Cross-Cultural Solutions
- International_Volunteer_HQ
- Global Work & Travel
- Global Brigades
- Rotary Youth Exchange
