= Mohannad Alakous =

Syrian writer and poet

- Born: 1989 (age 36–37); Damascus, Syria
- Occupation: writer
- Awards: Best Short Story for Adults Award, 2010; "Kitabi" Award of the Arab Thought Foundation, 2015; Al Multaqa Prize for Children's books publishers, 2015; First place Award in the Arab Theater Authority Institute, 2015

Mohannad Alakous, (Arabic: مهند العاقوص) a Syrian writer and poet, was born in 1983. He has several publications in children's literature, including his book "Are you Ziz?". He has won several awards including the Best Short Story for Children Award for his story "Are You a Cockroach Too?" in 2010.

== Education and career ==
Mohannad Alakous was born in Damascus, Syria, in 1983. He currently resides in the Sultanate of Oman. He started writing since he was in the secondary school. He was excellent in the Arabic language and was writing poetry since he was in middle school. He graduated from Damascus University and obtained a bachelor's degree in Teaching English as a Second Language. Later, he worked as an English teacher in public schools before working as a teacher at the Institute of Education for the Rehabilitation of vision impaired students from 2004 till 2009. Then, he worked as editor-in-chief of the Children's Magazine "Osama" in 2014, and then he became the director of "Hikayat" and "Ayoub" magazines, which the latter is issued in Oman. He worked as Editor-in-Chief of "Bi'ati" magazine by the Sultanate of Oman. Also, he was the director of the story series of the Ministry of Education in Oman and he is a member of the advisory committee for "Murshid" magazine. Alakous began his career in children's literature in 2011, when he published his first collection of stories in the magazine "Al Arabi Al-Saghir" and then wrote the story "Are you Ziz?" which won the "Kitabi" award of the Arab Though Foundation in 2015. Alakous has published numerous short stories, poetry, novels and plays including the novel "When the Lions Laugh" which was based on his teaching experience at the Institute of vision impaired students in Damascus, while his play "Orphan of the Jungle" won the first prize of the Arab Teather Authority Institute.

== Works ==
Some of his publication include the followings:

- “Are You Ziz?” (original title: Hal Anta Ziz?), 2013
- “Jasmine and the Sunflower” (original title: Yasameen and Zahrat Dawar the Shams), 2014
- “Dream Seller” (original title: Ta’e al Ahlam), 2015
- “Loaf of Bread” (original title: Rageef Khobz), 2016
- “How Many Starts in the Sky” (original title: Kam Najma fi al Samaa), 2017
- “Green Braids” (original title: Gadaieel Khadraa), 2017
- “A Watermelon in Mars” (original title: Bateekh fi al Mareekh), 2017

== Awards and honors ==
Alakous has won several awards including:

- Best Short Story for Adults Award, 2010
- “Kitabi” Award of the Arab Thought Foundation, 2015
- Al Multaqa Prize for Children's books publishers, 2015
- First place Award in the Arab Theater Authority Institute, 2015
- Honored at the First Childhood Conference in Karbala, Iraq, 2017
- Honored at the opening ceremony of the Children's Public Library in Muscat, 2017
- Honored at the Zubair Cultural Foundation, 2017
