= ELTon awards =

The ELTons (English Language Teaching Innovation Awards) are international awards given annually by the British Council that recognise and celebrate innovation in the field of English language teaching. They reward educational resources that help English language learners and teachers to achieve their goals using innovative content, methods or media. The ELTons date from 2003 and the 2018 sponsors of the awards are Cambridge English Language Assessment and IELTS. Applications are submitted by the end of November each year and they are judged by an independent panel of ELT experts, using the Delphi Technique. The shortlist is published in March and the winners announced at a ceremony in London in June. The 2018 awards were held in a new venue, Savoy Place, Institute of Engineering and Technology, London, UK.

== 2003 winners ==
- Tim Kelly and Hilary Nesi — University of Warwick
- Fiona Joseph and Peter Travis — Flo-Joe
- Martin Mulloy — BBC Worldwide

== 2004 winners ==
- Richard Cauldwell — Speech in Action (CD-ROM)
- Macmillan Education Dictionaries Team — Macmillan Education, range of products (book, CD-ROM and online editions)
- Scott Thornbury, Oxford University Press — Natural Grammar

== 2005 winners ==
- Vanessa Reilly, Oxford University Press — Three in a tree (book and multimedia package)
- Simon Mellor-Clark and Yvonne Baker de Altamirano, Macmillan Education — Campaign 1 coursebooks
- Sophie Ioannou-Georgiou and Pavlos Pavlou, Oxford University Press — Assessing Young Learners

== 2006 winners ==
- Corony Edwards and Jane Willis, University of Birmingham and Aston University — Teachers Exploring Tasks
- Carol Read, Ana Soberon, Maria Toth and Elisenda Papiol, Macmillan Education — Bugs (multimedia course)
- Stuart Rubenstein, Greta Grinfeld, Sally McCrae, Emma Fisher, Camden College of English— "English Language Cultural Experience"

== 2007 winners ==
- Alison Sharpe, Professor Ronald Carter and Professor Michael McCarthy, Cambridge University Press — The Cambridge Grammar of English (CD-ROM and book)
- David Warr, Language Garden — Language Gardening (CD-ROM)
- Nicky Hockly and Gavin Dudeney, The Consultants-E, ICT in the Classroom (online course)

== 2008 winners ==
- Paul Scott, BBC Learning English - Learning English Blogs
- Mark Furr, Jenny Bassett and Nicole Irving, Oxford University Press- Bookworms Club Reading Circles
- Nuala O’Sullivan, BBC Learning English- The Flatmates
- Emma Pathare, Dubai Women’s College, U.A.E - The Vocabulary Course

== 2009 winners ==
- Sarah Bromley, Sarah Johnson, Helen Cunningham, Gordon Knowles — 'Magazines Plus', Mary Glasgow Magazines

== 2010 winners ==
- Russell Stanard — www.teachertrainingvideos.com
- Mary Slattery, Catherine Kneafsey, Lucy Allen, Julia Bell — Teaching with Bear: Using puppets in the language classroom with young learners, Oxford University Press
- Scott Thornbury, Luke Meddings, Lindsay Clandfield, Mike Burghall — Teaching Unplugged, Delta Publishing
- James Thomas, Martina Pavlickova and Martina Sindelarova Skupenova — Global Issues in the ELT Classroom, Spolecnost pro Fair Trade
- Stuart Wiffin and Helen Gibbons — Award For Innovative Writing

== 2011 winners ==
- Neil Edgeller, Senjuti Masud, Sharif Sadique — Rinku's World, BBC Learning English
- Ben Glynne, Dan Humm Soriano, David Wilkins — Communication Station, United International College
- Rob Carter, Alice Castle, Abeer Hassan, Sean Keegan, Karim Kouchouk, Abigail Wincott — BBCe!, BBC Learning English
- Marcos Benevides, Adam Gray — Fiction in Action: Whodunit, ABAX ELT
- Simona Petrescu — Macmillan Education Award For Innovative Writing
- Brian Abbs and Ingrid Freebairn — Lifetime Achievement Award

== 2012 winners ==
- Kate Khoury, Sarah Raybould and Louise Salim — Sensing Humour in English
- Nik Peachey — Bell Blended Learning for ELT, Bell
- Macmillan Education— Sounds: The Pronunciation App, Macmillan Education
- Kyle Mawer, Graham Stanley — Digital Play: Computer games and language aims, Delta Publishing
- L2 — Wordready Academic English, L2
- Colour Trick — The Colour of Words, Colour Trick S.l.
- Alan Maley — Lifetime Achievement Award

== 2013 winners ==
- Mary Glasgow Scholastic — Mary Glasgow
- Y. L. Teresa Ting — CLIL - Biology Towards IGCSE
- Herbert Puchta and Günter Gerngross — Hooray! Let’s play! Helbling Languages
- Kieran Donaghy — "Film English"
- Richard Cauldwell — Cool Speech: Hot Listening, Cool Pronunciation, Speech in Action/Firsty Group
- English in Action — English in Action, Bangladesh
- Brita Haycraft — Lifetime Achievement Award

== 2014 winners ==
- Excellence in Course Innovation – Dyslexia for Teachers of English as a Foreign Language (Dystefl) by Dystefl Project
- Innovation in Learner Resources – Academic Skills Series by Collins
- Innovation in Teacher Resources – The Disabled Access Friendly campaign by Katie Quartano and Paul Shaw
- Digital Innovation – Doctors Speak Up: Communication and Language Skills for International Medical Graduates by R. Woodward-Kron, C. Bow, C. Fraser, J. Pill, E. Flynn
- Local Innovation – P.A.L.S Scheme, (Promoting Acceptance of Language Students) – Country Cousins Ltd
- The Macmillan Education Award for New Talent in Writing -Compass (Upper Intermediate) by Elizabeth (Lizzie) Pinard
- British Council The Lifetime Achievement Award – Michael Swan

Described at the ceremony as a name synonymous with “must-have texts” and “an influence on a generation of students”, influential writer and award-winning poet, Michael Swan was announced as the winner of the lifetime achievement award for his contribution to English language teaching.

== 2015 winners ==
- Excellence in Course Innovation – Oxford Discover by Oxford University Press
- Innovation in Learner Resources – Oxford Learner’s Dictionary of Academic English by Oxford University Press, with Paragon Software GmbH (app)
- Innovation in Teacher Resources – "Life Skills" by Macmillan Education
- Digital Innovation – Little Bridge by Little Bridge
- Local Innovation -Talk English by Manchester Adult Education Service, Manchester City Council with The Department for Communities and Local Government (UK)
- The Macmillan Education Award for New Talent in Writing – EAP Shakespeare Dr Chris Lima
- The British Council Lifetime Achievement Award – Henry Widdowson

The 2015 British Council Lifetime Achievement Award winner, Henry Widdowson, is a leading authority in applied linguistics and in communicative language teaching, an approach which stresses the importance of interaction, authentic, natural language, a focus on the learning process, and on the student's personal experiences both inside and outside the classroom.

== 2016 winners ==
- Excellence in Course Innovation – Keynote by National Geographic Learning with Cengage Learning
- Innovation in Learner Resources – Literacy for Active Citizenship by Learning Unlimited LTD
- Innovation in Teacher Resources – Digital Video – A Manual for Language Teachers by PeacheyPublications.com
- Digital Innovation – Movies: Enjoy Language by Archimedes Inspiration, a.s.
- Local Innovation – Teaching English in Africa by East African Educational Publishers Ltd.
- The Macmillan Education Award for New Talent in Writing – "Academic English for the 21st Century Learner" by Aylin Graves
- The British Council Lifetime Achievement Award – "Catherine Walter"

Catherine Walter is known by many thousands of teachers and students worldwide as a teacher, lecturer and researcher, most recently as University lecturer in Applied Linguistics at the Department of Education and Fellow of Linacre College, University of Oxford and Vice-Principal of Linacre College (until 2015), as well as senior lecturer at the Institute of Education, University of London, and at academic and teachers’ conferences in over 30 countries worldwide. She is perhaps most renowned by the global ELT community, as the writer of many significant resources on the bookshelves of classrooms worldwide. These include: The Cambridge English Course, The New Cambridge English Course, The Good Grammar Book and How English Works (co-written with Michael Swan). Over the years, her expertise has been sought by the Bell Educational Trust, the British Publishers Association, the University Council for General and Applied Linguistics and the British Council. Catherine Walter has a passion for equality, holding welfare, equality and equal opportunities positions at the University of Oxford and the Institute of Education. Catherine Walter was also the first female chair of the International Association of Teachers of English as a Foreign Language (IATEFL) and then president.

== 2017 Winners ==
- Excellence in Course Innovation – Students for Peace by Richmond
- Innovation in Learner Resources – Develop EAP: A Sustainable Academic English Skills Course by Averil Bolster & Peter Levrai
- Innovation in Teacher Resources – Tigtag CLIL by Twig World
- Digital Innovation – www.textinspector.com by Stephen Bax with Versantus IT Services and Web design
- Local Innovation in partnership with Cambridge Assessment English – Hausa-to-English Talking Book 1 by Dr Bilkisu Yusuf Hassan, Prof. AH Amfani, Mallam Mohammed Awwal Umar, Lucy Bella Earl and Mavis Computel Limited
- The British Council Lifetime Achievement Award – Professor Ronald Carter MBE

Professor Carter (University of Nottingham, MBE for services to education) has been a major positive influence in English Language Teaching, with a service spanning several decades. He has written and edited over forty books and over one hundred articles, including the very influential Cambridge Grammar of English (CUP, 2006), co-written with Michael McCarthy, which won the 2007 British Council English Language Innovation Award. Ron has been a pioneer in the application of corpora (especially spoken ones) to the development of pedagogical materials and teacher resources. Professor Ron Carter has been at Nottingham University since 1979 and has been director of the Centre for English Language Education and head of the School of English. He was a founder member of PALA (Poetics and Linguistics Association) in the 1980s and one of its first chairs. From 1989 to 1992 he directed nationwide the Language in the National Curriculum (LINC) Project. He was elected a life member of NATE (National Association for the Teaching of English) in 2007. He is on the editorial boards of numerous international academic and professional journals. He has lectured in over 40 countries worldwide. He was also chair of BAAL (British Association for Applied Linguistics) from 2003 to 2006 and was recently elected a fellow of the British Academy for Social Sciences. He received an MBE for services to local and national higher education in the 2009 New Year's Honours list and in 2013 was awarded an honorary doctorate (DUniv) from the Open University for his contributions to the field of applied linguistics. He is currently closely involved with the work of Cambridge University Press Syndicates as a member of the Operating Board of the Press and as chair of the Education and ELT Publishing Committee. He also holds an affiliated lectureship in the Faculty of Medieval and Modern Languages at the University of Cambridge.

== 2018 Winners ==
- Excellence in Course Innovation – Get Set, Go! Phonics by Oxford University Press
- Innovation in Learner Resources – Tim's Pronunciation Workshop by BBC Learning English
- Innovation in Teacher Resources – PronPack 1-4 by Mark Hancock
- Digital Innovation – Learn Languages with Ruby Rei by Wibbu
- Local Innovation in partnership with Cambridge Assessment English – EAL Assessment Framework for Schools by The Bell Foundation with Prof. Constant Leung, King's College London; Dr. Michael Evans and Dr. Yongcan Liu, Cambridge University (Cambridge University Technical Services Limited)
- The British Council Lifetime Achievement Award – "Tessa Woodward"

Tessa Woodward is an ELT consultant, a teacher, teacher trainer, and for many years was the Professional Development Co-ordinator at Hilderstone College, Broadstairs, Kent, UK. She has trained teachers in Japan, Switzerland, the UK, USA, and, for short stints, in many European countries. She regularly gives presentations at ELT conferences. She is the founder editor of The Teacher Trainer journal, now in its 31st volume, for Pilgrims, Canterbury, UK. She is a past president and International Ambassador of IATEFL and founded the IATEFL Special Interest Group for Teacher Trainers (now the SIG T Ed/TT). She is the author of many books and articles for language teachers and for teacher trainers. Tessa is also the founder of The Fair List. Her qualifications include an RSA Diploma in TEFL, and an M. Phil in Education from Exeter University.

== 2019 Winners ==
- Excellence in Course Innovation – Widgets Inc.: A task-based course in workplace English by Atama-ii Books
- Innovation in Learner Resources – Ready to Run: Authentic ELT video for language schools and teachers by Digital Learning Associates ltd.
- Innovation in Teacher Resources – Teaching English Online by Cambridge Assessment English
- Digital Innovation – Go Correct by Big Languages
- Local innovation in partnership with Cambridge Assessment English - Hands Up Project playwriting competition by The Hands Up Project with UNRWA
- The British Council Outstanding Achievement Award (formerly known as the Lifetime Achievement Award)–Professor David Crystal OBE

Professor David Crystal is one of the world’s foremost experts on the English language.

Professor Crystal’s work, spanning writing, research, talks, lectures, and radio and television broadcasts, have had an enormous influence on those with an interest in language worldwide. His clear, eloquent and often humorous explanations of English grammar, spelling, punctuation and pronunciation, as well as his works on Shakespeare, have inspired generations to understand how language works.

His books can be found in schools, universities and homes around the world, treasured by English language educators and students young and old. Professor Crystal has a global influence. Nominations for the award were received as far and wide as Russia, Ethiopia and New Zealand.

His influence on the world of English extends to its institutions, through his patronage of the UK National Literacy Association, the Royal College of Speech and Language Therapists, the International Association of Teachers of English as a Foreign Language, and the British Council, to name but a few.

As the UK’s national treasure of linguistics, the British Council is honoured to present Professor Crystal with the ELTons award for Outstanding Contribution 2019.

== 2020 Winners ==
- Excellence in Course Innovation – New Magic Minds! by Learning Factory (Brazil)
- Innovation in Learner Resources – Pearson and BBC Live Classes by Pearson English (UK)
- Innovation in Teacher Resources – The ELT Footprint Community by ELT Footprint Community (Spain)
- Digital Innovation – Busuu English Smart Review by Busuu (UK/Spain)
- Local innovation in partnership with Cambridge Assessment English - The Garden Project – Brazilian Edition by Angelica Manca, Hoopla Education Pte. Ltd. With Macmillan Do Brasil Editora, Comercializadora, and Importadora E Distribudora (Singapore / Brazil)
- The British Council Outstanding Achievement Award (formerly known as the Lifetime Achievement Award)– Opal Dunn

Opal Dunn is responsible for the enthusiasm of many teachers around the world for using picture books as a flexible resource and to provide children around the world – girls and boys – with exposure to rich, authentic language. Opal wrote many children’s picture books, which were translated into multiple languages and donated hundreds of picture books worldwide. In Japan, in 1977, she pioneered the creation of mother and child groups (the International Children’s Bunko) to support bilingual, bicultural families. Opal was honoured by the Japanese Presidency in 2010 for services to Japanese families. The judges commented she was ahead of her time, in a world where now, more and more children grow up with multiple languages. The judges were quoted as saying ‘nobody has done more, for longer for teaching English to young learners than Opal, and your impact continues’.

== ELTons Judges’ Commendations for Equality, Diversity and Inclusion ==
- Dyslexia Bytes by Martin Bloomfield
- I am not naughty – I really, really mean it! by Basirat Razaq-Shuaib with The Winford Centre for Children and Women, Nigeria
- Journey 2 Basic Skills by Klik2learn with City College Glasgow
- Kids’ Web by Richmond
- REAL LIVES Series by ELI Publishing and partners
- The NO Project by The NO Project with The Rights Lab, Nottingham University

== 2021 Winners ==
- Excellence in Course Innovation – Our Languages by StandFor / FTD Educação
- Innovation in Learner Resources – Fiction Express by Fiction Express (Boolino SL)
- Innovation in Teacher Resources –Teaching English to Pre-Primary Children by DELTA Publishing
- Digital Innovation – CIELL-Comics for Inclusive English Language Learning by Lancaster University with AKTO Art & Design College, Innovation in Learning Institute, Friedrich-Alexander-Universität, Erlangen-Nürnberg, Language Centre, University of Cyprus
- Local innovation - Facebook Live Team Teaching for the Palestinian English Curriculum by The Hands Up Project with UNRWA (Gaza)
- The British Council Outstanding Achievement Award (formerly known as the Lifetime Achievement Award)– Prof. N S Prabhu
- The British Council ELTons Outstanding Achievement Award for an organisation or collective - The A S Hornby Educational Trust

A.S. Hornby (1898-1978) was a distinguished English language specialist who began his career as a teacher in Japan. He then worked for the British Council and helped found ELT Journal, and, later, IATEFL. While teaching in Japan, Hornby and colleagues compiled an innovative dictionary for learners of English, which became the Oxford Advanced Learner’s Dictionary, one of OUP’s best-selling titles ever. Hornby donated a substantial part of his royalties to create the A.S. Hornby Educational Trust in 1961.

In partnership with the British Council, during the 60 years since then the Trust has supported over 470 ELT professionals from around the world via Hornby Scholarships, and thousands more via regional schools, an alumni network and Teacher Association project awards. The Trust also supports dictionary-related research and research into the history of ELT.

== ELTons Judges’ Commendations for Equality, Diversity and Inclusion ==
- Para Powerlifting English Competency Course (World Para Powerlifting; Germany with International Paralympic Committee)
- Sensations English (UK)
- Communicating Identities (Routledge; UK / New Zealand)
- Teaching in Challenging Circumstances (Cambridge University Press; UK)
- Booklet of basics grammar in ASL and pictures for deaf and hard hearing (General Directorate for special education and continuous education, Ministry of education in Sultanate of Oman with AI ROYAA NEWSPAPER; Sultanate of Oman)
- Facebook Live Team Teaching for the Palestinian English Curriculum (The Hands Up Project; UK and UNRWA; Gaza)
- Mosaik Dogme Toolkit (Mosaik Education with Scott Thornbury; UK)
- Our Languages (StandFor / FTD Educação; Brazil)
- CIELL-Comics for Inclusive English Language Learning (Lancaster University; UK, AKTO Art & Design College; Greece, Innovation in Learning Institute, Friedrich-Alexander-Universität, Erlangen-Nürnberg; Germany and Language Centre, University of Cyprus; Cyprus)
- Vlogger Academy (Digital Learning Associated Limited with The Weirdos and Creatives Collective; UK)

== ELTons Judges’ Commendations for Environmental Sustainability and Climate Action ==
- Sensations English (UK) - Global news-based video and article lessons with subtitles, transcripts and interactive activities to extend the learning experience.

== 2022 Winners ==
- Innovation in Learner Resources - Helbling Shakespeare Series, Deborah J Ellis, Maria Cleary - Helbling Languages (Austria)
- Innovation in Teacher Resources - Ideas in Action: Activities for Mediation, Ethan Mansur, Riccardo Chiappini, Jason Anderson, Kate Baade - DELTA Publishing (Germany)
- Local Innovation - Picture This!, Sarah Sheldon, Ingrid Guyon - Learning Unlimited with Fotosynthesis (United Kingdom)
- Excellence in Course Innovation - Brain Juice, Andrew Starling, Alisa Delgado, Andrew Dainty, Daniela Tovar, Alan Morlán, Lyzzy Jardon, Rubi Ramirez, Susana Moreno - University of Dayton Publishing (Mexico)
- Digital Innovation - EF Hyper Class, William Dekker, Tim Ackroyd, Lee Schuneman, Greg Carew, Yuanlai Xu, David Carrol, Nick Lin - EF Education First (UK)
- The British Council ELTons Outstanding Achievement Award - Professor Penny Ur OBE

== ELTons Judges’ Commendations for Equality, Diversity and Inclusion ==
- Classroom Practices:English as a Lingua Franca (StandFor/FTD Educação)
- Dau Dau (Keningau Vocational College with Macmillan Education and International House World Organisation)
- May Moo and Me (StandFor/FTD Educação)

== ELTons Judges’ Commendations for Environmental Sustainability and Climate Action ==
- Brain Juice (University of Dayton Publishing)
- Lift (National Geographic Learning, Cengage Learning EMEA Ltd with Empatico)
- Speak Out for Sustainability (Pearson English with BBC Studios)
