= Jon Heese =

Japanese politician (born 1963)

- ジョン・ヘイズ

Personal details
- Born: February 17, 1963 (age 63) Saskatchewan, Canada
- Party: Independent
- Education: University of Regina

Jon Heese (ヘイズ・ジョン, Heizu Jon; born February 17, 1963) is a Canadian-born Japanese politician. He is an independent member of the Ibaraki Prefectural Assembly (1 term). He is a former member of the Tsukuba City Council (4 terms).

Heese came to Japan from Canada in 1991, and after working as an English conversation teacher, he was first elected to the Tsukuba City Council in October 2008.

== Biography ==
Heese was born in Saskatchewan, Canada, graduated from the University of Regina in 1991. He married a Japanese woman in 1998, and became a naturalized citizen of Japan in 2007.

Prior to entering politics, Heese worked as an English language teacher and owned a bar. He has also worked as an actor, playing (fictional) American Presidents in the tokusatsu films Nihon Igai Zenbu Chinbotsu (2006) and Monster X Strikes Back: Attack the G8 Summit (2008). Heese stated he got the parts because casting directors noticed his resemblance to former President Bill Clinton.

== Political career ==
Heese is the third naturalized citizen from Europe or North America to become a Japanese legislator, following Marutei Tsurunen, a former member of the House of Councillors from Yugawara Town, Kanagawa Prefecture, and Anthony Bianchi, a former member of the Inuyama City Council, Aichi Prefecture.

Heese is the president of Imagineric and a member of the Tsukuba Representative Committee of the Ibaraki Foreigners' Roundtable.

In December 2014, Heese ran as an independent candidate for the Ibaraki Prefectural Assembly election from the Tsukuba City electoral district, but was unsuccessful. In 2016, he was elected to the Tsukuba City Assembly for a third term.

In December 2022, Heese ran for election as a member of the Ibaraki Prefectural Assembly from Tsukuba City and won.

== Filmography ==
- Nihon Igai Zenbu Chinbotsu (2006) - President Pepiton
- Monster X Strikes Back: Attack the G8 Summit (2008) - President Berger

== See also ==
- Anthony Bianchi
- Marutei Tsurunen
