= Cross-Cultural Solutions =

Cross-Cultural Solutions, also known as CCS, was a New Rochelle, New York-based non-for-profit engaged in voluntourism: customers paid to volunteer and then were placed in projects in other countries, assisting with education, health-care and community development projects.

Reviews on Yelp from volunteers are either very positive or very negative about the organization. The last Yelp review is from 2021 and says:

I paid for my son to go on the Costa Rica trip, COVID-19 hit and they cancelled the trip for 4/2020. They were supposed to give me a refund and never did. I kept getting the run around from Katie Nichols. Now they're phone numbers and website don't work. They took my money and didn't let anyone know what the deal was. They just totally shut down. Getting in touch with someone for information was hard and that should have been an immediate red flag. But we were so excited to be a part of their program that I didn't pay it any mind. I will never recommend anyone sign up with them. I just want my money back.

The last version of the Cross Cultural Solutions web site (crossculturalsolutions.org) as archived the Wayback Machine in January 2021.

== Sources ==
- The Huffington Post - 5 Things You Can't Do in Ghana as a Tourist
- CNN.com - More older Americans signing on to volunteer abroad
- TIME - Volunteer Vacations

== See also ==
- International_Volunteer_HQ
- Global Work & Travel
- Global Brigades
- Rotary Youth Exchange
- Volunteers in Africa Foundation
