= Al-Azhar English Training Centre =

Facility at Al-Azhar University in Cairo, Egypt

The Al-Azhar English Training Centre (AAETC) is an English language teaching facility at Al-Azhar University in Cairo funded by Al Azhar University with the support of the British government. The centre opened in February 2008 and is managed by the British Council. The centre aims to give students the skills to "discuss and explain Islam", especially to non-Muslims, as well as training Egyptian teachers in methodology, mentoring and management.
