= Global Brigades =

Non-profit organization

Global Brigades, Inc.
- Founded: 2007
- Type: Health & Development; Secular 501c3
- Location: Fresno, USA
- Region served: Ghana, Greece, Guatemala, Honduras, Nicaragua, and Panama
- Website: http://www.globalbrigades.org

Global Brigades (GB) is a nonprofit health and sustainable development organization that works with volunteers from North American and European universities, as well as local staff in Central America and West Africa. GB partners with communities to reduce inequalities. Global Brigades implements their Holistic Model to meet a community's health and economic goals. The organization's model builds community ownership and executes programs with the end goal of sustainably transitioning to a relationship of impact monitoring.

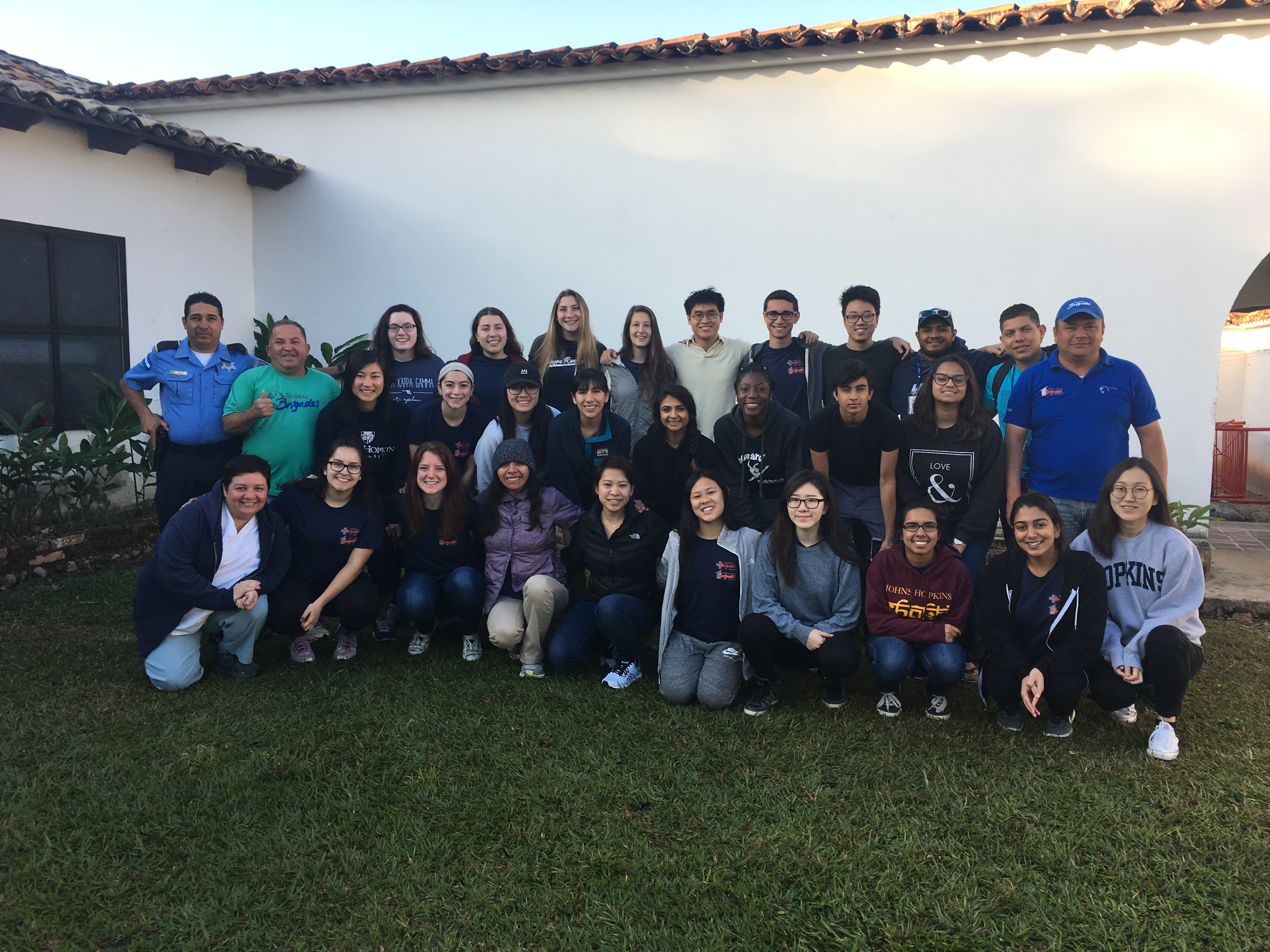
The Medical Brigades chapter after their week-long brigade in Honduras.

According to the organization's website, more than 65,000 volunteers from over 800 university clubs have traveled to partner with local staff to provide health and economic development to more than 1 million beneficiaries in 4 countries. Many volunteer groups are officially recognized by their university as a registered international service learning club or organization. Brigades usually consist of 15-50 volunteers who participate in 7 to 10 day brigades. The organization has concentrated its efforts on communities in Honduras, Panama, Nicaragua, and Ghana. Various programs are designed to suit the unique health and economic development goals of each community. Global Brigades currently has 7 different programs: public health, water, engineering, business, medical, dental, and legal empowerment.

Global Brigades' Monitoring and Evaluation team tracks the impact made through its Holistic Model. Before a community is selected as a partner, Global Brigades will research if a community will benefit from the program by performing a needs assessment and collecting baseline community data. Before volunteers arrive, Global Brigades staff also visits with the community to discuss goals, expected outcomes, and responsibilities with the community members. Partner communities then receive volunteers who shadow or assist local engineers, doctors, dentists, and technicians, depending on the task and volunteer's qualifications related to the program.

Between brigade visits, Global Brigades' staff will visit the community to ensure program implementation. Once a community has met their goals in healthcare, WASH and economic development, they no longer receive volunteers and community leaders independently continue the maintenance of infrastructure and grow their knowledge, leadership and economic capacity, with support from Global Brigades' staff on an as-needed basis.

== History ==
In 2003, co-founders Duffy Casey and Shital Chauhan in partnership with a local Honduran organization, Sociedad Amigos de los Ninos (SAN,) led a group of doctors and Marquette University students to Honduras in order to provide medical care to rural communities. After partnering with co-founders Arman Nadershahi and Liran Amir, Casey and Chauhan formalized a US nonprofit organization named Global Medical Relief. However, by the end of 2005, Chauhan, Casey along with Steven Atamian and Gerardo Enrique Rodriguez (an employee of SAN) had created a new brand called Global Medical Brigades and operated as a department within SAN with the support of Sister Maria Rosa Leggol. In that year, the chapters expanded from one university to four, including the University of Southern California, the University of Michigan, and the University of California, Los Angeles.

In 2007, Atamian, Catherine Berman, Casey, Chauhan, and Nadershahi established a new US entity called Global Brigades, received its 501(c)(3) and incorporated in California. Under their leadership Global Brigades focused on "holistic programming" and with the help of graduate school advisor Don Osborne expanded into 30 new campuses. In 2008, Global Brigades continued expanding its programs into new types of brigades, such as Public Health, Human Rights, Microfinance, Architecture, and Environmental. Additionally, the organization experienced its first international expansion into Canada. By 2009, the organization had hired US employees "to manage administrative functions and support program development." The Global Brigades Association was formed in 2011 in an attempt to organize the now global organization into a single international entity.

In 2015, the Inter-American Development Bank granted Global Brigades a $1 million grant to scale its finance and public health programming. It has since received grants and funding from other institutional supporters such as the Whole Planet Foundation, Kiva, and the World Bank among many. The organization diversified its funding from grants through launching several social enterprises, such as: Empowered.org (an online fundraising platform) led by Oisin O'Connor, Cafe Holistico (a partnership with coffee-growing communities in Central America, with the goal to double and triple farmer income while producing gourmet coffee for students to fundraise with); Eskala, Inc (a financial inclusion organization) led by Pallav Vora, Pablo Garron, Luis Quan, Juan David Villegas, and Colleen O'Brien; Montemar (affordable housing) led by James Mary O'Connor and Bruce White; Kambia Education (faculty-led service learning programs) led by Orion Haas, and Squads Abroad (high school service learning) led by Erik Werner. (a

== Holistic Model ==
The Holistic Model of Global Brigades focuses on six developmental goals to empower communities. These six goals include: sustainable health systems, daily access to a trained community health worker, in-home clean water, home sanitation infrastructure, community-owned banking, and economic development. These six goals are ordered in what Global Brigades believes to be the most needed in a community, through the extensive research they do of each community.

Global Brigades aligns their Holistic Model with the three United Nations Sustainable Development Goals: Good Health and Well-being, clean water and sanitation, and decent work and economic growth.

== Criticism ==
The volunteering work of the organization is occasionally advertised about the experience for volunteers. This is sometimes referred to as voluntourism – a portmanteau of volunteering and tourism, and can be seen as being both positive and negative. Global Brigades provides clarification for various points of criticism on their common critiques FAQ.

== See also ==
- Global Business Brigades
- Cross-Cultural Solutions
- International_Volunteer_HQ
- Global Work & Travel
- Rotary Youth Exchange
- Volunteers in Africa Foundation
