= JET Programme =

Japan Exchange and Teaching Programme

- Japan Exchange and Teaching Programme
- Founded: 1987
- Merger of: Monbusho English Fellows Program; British English Teachers Scheme
- Type: Teaching English as a foreign language
- Location: Japan
- Members: 5,734 (Note: Includes only ALTs, CIRs, and SEAs) (2026)
- Affiliations: Association for Japan Exchange and Teaching (AJET)
- Website: jetprogramme.org/en/

The Japan Exchange and Teaching Programme (外国語青年招致事業, Gaikokugo Seinen Shōchi Jigyō), often shortened to the JET Programme (JETプログラム, Jetto Puroguramu), is a teaching program sponsored by the Japanese government that brings foreign university graduates to Japan as Assistant Language Teachers (ALTs), Sports Education Advisors (SEAs), or Coordinators for International Relations (CIRs) for local governments and boards of education.

JET is one of the world's largest international exchange programmes. Since its beginning in 1987, over 82,000 people from 82 countries have participated. Official statistics published in July 2025 showed that 5,933 participants from 54 countries were employed on the programme at that time. Japanese citizens are only allowed to apply if they relinquish their Japanese citizenship first. The programme states that its goal is to "promote internationalization in Japan's local communities by improving foreign language education and fostering international exchange at the community level."

JET requires applicants to be fluent in English, possess citizenship of certain countries, and hold a bachelor's degree; the degree can be in any subject and does not have to be related to languages or teaching, as the programme's focus is less on teachers and more on cultural ambassadors who are able to assist Japanese teachers of English. Applicants do not have to be familiar with the Japanese language, though resources are provided for those who wish to learn during their time in the country. The vast majority of participants are recent graduates, but there is no age limit. About 90% of participants are ALTs, with the rest divided between CIRs and SEAs. Participants can be employed on the programme for a maximum of five years.

== History ==
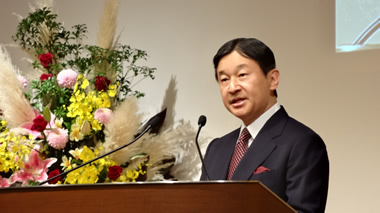
Crown Prince Naruhito speaking at the programme's 30th anniversary commemorative ceremony at the Keio Plaza Hotel in November 2016

In August 1987, the JET Programme was formed by a merger of the Monbusho English Fellows Program and the British English Teachers Scheme (formerly the English Teaching Recruitment Programme). JET offers English speakers with bachelor's degrees full-time employment as either an Assistant Language Teacher (ALT) in elementary and secondary schools, a Sports Exchange Advisor (SEA) whose role is to assist with sports training and the planning of sports related projects, or a Coordinator for International Relations (CIR) in selected local government offices in Japan.

The programme later revised its aims to "increase mutual understanding between the people of Japan and the people of other nations, to promote internationalisation in Japan's local communities by helping to improve foreign language education, and to develop international exchange at the community level". The total number of JET participants steadily decreased from a high of 6,273 in 2002 to 4,330 in 2011, then began to increase and stabilize.

== Administrative details ==
The programme is operated by the Ministry of Internal Affairs and Communications; the Ministry of Foreign Affairs; and the Ministry of Education, Culture, Sports, Science and Technology (MEXT) in conjunction with local authorities. It is administered by the Council of Local Authorities for International Relations (CLAIR) and has an annual budget of over ¥45 billion (approximately $314 million).

The Association of Japan Exchange and Teaching (AJET) provides support for programme participants, and facilitates communication with the programme's sponsors. AJET organises events and has a number of publications to assist with teaching in Japan, including Planet Eigo and Foxy Phonics. AJET is not an official JET organization and has no official ties with CLAIR.

== Application process ==
As of 2025, applicants must hold a bachelor's degree in any subject, be a citizen of the country where the recruitment and selection procedures take place, not possess Japanese citizenship, have excellent written and spoken skills in the designated language (English or, for non-English speaking countries, English or their principal language), have a keen interest in the country and culture of Japan, and not have lived in Japan for six or more years after the year 2016 nor be a former participant in JET since 2023.

Prospective participants must submit a detailed application including a statement of purpose and self-reported medical form, usually in November or December of the year before their departure. Those who pass stage one of the process are invited to interviews which are conducted in major cities or online, usually in February. Although applications are accepted from people living in Japan, there are no interviews offered in the country and applicants must interview in their home country. Interviews are conducted in English or in the language of the applicant's country, and part of the interview will be conducted in Japanese if the applicant indicated Japanese ability on their application or if they are a CIR applicant. The interview is normally conducted by a panel of three people consisting of former JETs and members of Japanese government, embassy, and consulate organizations. The interviews are approximately 20 minutes long. Interviewees are then offered a position, rejected, or designated as "alternates" (backup applicants who may participate if positions become available).

Once offered a position, applicants must formally submit their acceptance or rejection of the offer. In addition, they must provide the results of a recent physical examination that has been performed by a physician within the last three months. Finally, they must submit detailed contact information so that the programme can send them materials and information as the departure date draws nearer. Participants usually learn of their placement details during May and July, just before their departure date of either late July (Group A) or early August (Group B). Alternates may receive very short notice, sometimes only a few weeks, if a placement becomes available. A small group of alternates will usually arrive in late August (Group C) and other alternates will arrive alone at various times throughout the fall. Applicants who withdraw from the program after receiving placement notification are ineligible to reapply the following year. Applicants are required to depart in a group from the city in which they were interviewed, although rare exceptions are made. Departure usually takes place from the Japanese embassy or consulate that serves the applicant's home town, though it could theoretically be any site in the country the applicant named on their application. Air fares are arranged by the programme.

Participants are required to attend pre-departure and post-arrival orientations, as well as annual mid-year conferences, and may attend a returnee conference during their tenure. Participants are placed with a local authority in Japan (the contracting organization) which serves as their employer. There are 47 prefectural governments and 12 city governments in addition to numerous individual city, town, and village governments and some private schools designated as contracting organizations. While applicants can specify up to three preferred locations and can request urban, semi-rural, or rural placements, they may be placed anywhere in Japan and placements may not match their requests.

Participants sign a one-year contract which can be renewed up to four times for a maximum of five years. Some contracting organizations offer the option of contracting for a total of five years, although some prohibit contracting beyond three years. Before 2006, participants could only contract for up to three years, with the exception of a few positions. A small percentage of exceptional participants are elected to stay for the maximum number of consecutive appointments, a sum of four renewal cycles, for a total of five years. Participants who began their tenure on the programme during or before 2011 received an annual net salary of ¥3.6 million (approximately $25,142). Since 2012, participants have been paid on a new annual salary scale: ¥3.36 million (approximately $23,466) for the first year, ¥3.6 million (approximately $25,142) for the second year, ¥3.9 million (approximately $27,237) for the third year, and ¥3.96 million (approximately $27,656) each for the fourth and fifth years; notably, this is the gross salary as opposed to the pre-2011 net salary, so participants who are liable for income or residential taxes in Japan must pay them.

The Japanese government provides participants with airfare to and from Japan, and may receive other benefits such as housing subsidies. Participants are generally forbidden to take paid work outside of their programme duties.

== Assistant Language Teacher responsibilities ==
The duties of ALTs include assisting with English classes taught by Japanese teachers in primary and elementary high schools, English language training activities at primary and elementary schools, the preparation of materials for English language teaching, the language training of Japanese teachers of English, organizing and preparing activities for extracurricular activities and clubs, providing information on language and other related subjects to teachers' consultants and Japanese teachers of English (such as word usage and pronunciations), and English language speech contests. ALTs must also engage in local international exchange activities.

== Participation ==
Due to the nature of JET, most of its participants come from primarily English-speaking countries. In 2014, which saw 4,476 JET participants, about half of them were from the United States (2,457), Canada (495), the United Kingdom (383), Australia (315), New Zealand (255), South Africa (93), and Ireland (86).

Participants by country and year
Year	United States	United Kingdom	Australia	New Zealand	Canada	Ireland	Others (Note: France and Germany were the only other participating countries from 1989 to 1991)	Total	Ref.
1987	592	150	83	23	0	0	0	848	
1988	871	248	143	34	127	20	0	1,443	
1989	1,090	370	146	43	290	36	12	1,987	
1990	1,249	396	145	71	366	41	16	2,284	
1991	1,545	488	142	130	488	45	36	2,874	
1992	1,710	596	182	165	586	44	42	3,325	
1993	1,898	686	219	198	656	59	69	3,785	
1994	2,180	729	242	200	685	60	89	4,185	
1995	2,411	819	274	201	723	69	132	4,629	
1996	2,599	920	299	213	761	72	169	5,033	
1997	2,583	1,033	338	225	854	88	226	5,347	
1998	2,613	1,128	355	255	873	93	360	5,677	
1999	2,560	1,183	407	306	900	95	374	5,825	
2000	2,514	1,320	417	370	998	99	360	6,078	
2001	2,477	1,405	417	371	1,057	95	368	6,190	
2002	2,669	1,287	447	397	991	99	383	6,273	
2003	2,729	1,215	438	375	981	109	379	6,226	
2004	2,841	1,060	431	345	894	132	400	6,103	
2005	2,876	905	426	323	774	118	430	5,852	
2006	2,879	717	387	274	685	114	452	5,508	
2007	2,808	577	316	242	618	95	483	5,119	
2008	2,681	440	276	208	529	78	459	4,682	
2009	2,537	390	272	194	481	96	466	4,436	
2010	2,420	399	254	206	474	112	469	4,334	
2011	2,332	440	265	226	487	103	487	4,330	
2012	2,334	432	262	248	477	107	500	4,360	
2013	2,359	388	300	255	484	99	487	4,372	
2014	2,457	383	315	255	495	86	485	4,476	
2015	2,695	410	346	241	499	92	503	4,786	
2016	2,814	409	340	237	500	101	551	4,952	
2017	2,924	423	351	235	494	98	638	5,163	
2018	3,012	513	355	240	566	113	729	5,528	
2019	3,105	560	343	251	557	114	831	5,761	
2020–2021 Irregular arrivals due to border restrictions arising from the COVID-19 pandemic
2022	3,047	685	266	202	564	116	852	5,723	
2023	3,042	762	268	187	573	112	887	5,831	
2024	3,002	741	287	182	548	120	981	5,861	
2025	3,032	777	255	171	521	119	1,058	5,933	
2026	2,866	760	239	171	468	122	1,108	5,734	

=== Countries currently participating in the JET Programme ===
- Antigua and Barbuda
- Argentina
- Australia
- Austria
- Bangladesh
- Barbados
- Belgium
- Bhutan
- Botswana
- Brazil
- Canada
- China
- Croatia
- Denmark
- Finland
- France
- Germany
- Grenada
- India
- Indonesia
- Ireland
- Italy
- Jamaica
- Kyrgyzstan
- Latvia
- Lithuania
- Malaysia
- Mauritius
- Mexico
- Mongolia
- Myanmar
- Netherlands
- New Zealand
- Peru
- Philippines
- Poland
- Russia
- Saint Lucia
- Saint Vincent and the Grenadines
- Singapore
- Slovenia
- South Africa
- South Korea
- Spain
- Sweden
- Switzerland
- Tanzania
- Thailand
- Trinidad and Tobago
- United Kingdom
- United States
- Uzbekistan
- Vietnam

=== Countries that have participated in the JET Programme ===
- Bulgaria
- Chile
- Czechia
- Egypt
- Estonia
- Ethiopia
- Fiji
- Ghana
- Greece
- Hungary
- Israel
- Kazakhstan
- Kenya
- Luxembourg
- Malta
- Micronesia
- Norway
- Pakistan
- Palau
- Portugal
- Romania
- Saint Kitts and Nevis
- Samoa
- Serbia and Montenegro / FR Yugoslavia
- Seychelles
- Tonga
- Turkey
- Ukraine

== Developments ==
Some JET participants in recent years have been placed in elementary schools, reflecting MEXT's plan to raise the English ability of Japanese students. Some contracting organizations go further and have ALTs periodically work with kindergarten students, teaching basic English vocabulary through games and activities. This also brings them exposure to foreigners. Participants occasionally also teach in special education.

Several prefectures have opted out of JET in recent years, and some hire individuals directly through advertising or word of mouth, while others use an intermediary dispatch company—usually one of the big English schools such as Heart, Interac, or Altia. Whilst directly hired employees may obtain working conditions similar to the JET Programme, those employed by dispatch companies often have very different working contracts that include unpaid holidays or pay-by-the-day contracts. Some dispatch methods used by certain boards of education have even been declared illegal by Japanese labor standards authorities.

Since 1998, the Hong Kong government has operated a similar program known as the Native English-speaking Teacher scheme, which employs about 800 teachers. The South Korean government has also implemented a similar program called EPIK (English Program in Korea).

In 2007, the possible stay for some JET participants was extended from three years to five years, subject to certain stipulations. JET participants in their third year are able to re-contract two more times if their work performance, accomplishments, and abilities are deemed outstanding by their contracting organization. However, as in most JET matters, the application process is decided upon by the individual contracting organization.

In 2009, it became possible to apply for an April start. This option does not exclude the applicant from being considered from the traditional August start. Successful applicants starting in April are notified in early March, which includes details on their placement. The April start is in line with the start of the Japanese school year.

In May 2010, the JET programme came up for review by the Government Revitalization Unit, the jigyōshiwake budget review panel, due to the need to cut costs given the state of the economy of Japan. However, the subsequent LDP administration of Shinzō Abe in fact announced its expansion and aimed to double its size within years.

In February 2012, The Japan Times alleged that one contracting board of education had fraudulently deducted payments from JET participants and harassed whistleblowers of the practice.

In January 2019, Medium posted a report on an incident that involved a board of education attempting to cover up an incident of sexual assault concerning two members of the JET Programme. This bought awareness of similar events over the years in the programme. Those involved claim that JET has vowed to increase their support for JETs in the future and to work closer with boards of education, but no official statement was made by JET. In December 2020, it was reported in Japanese media that the plaintiff had begun seeking legal redress and damages from the Nagasaki Prefecture's local government.

== Notable alumni ==
- Michael Auslin, American historian and Japanologist
- Anthony Bianchi, American-born Japanese politician
- Chris Broad, English YouTuber
- Zack Davisson, American writer and translator of Japanese`
- Mark Elliott, English travel writer
- Katharine Gun, English linguist
- Karl Taro Greenfeld, Japanese-American journalist and author
- Michael Green, American political expert and Japanologist
- Katharine Gun, English linguist
- Jen Kiggans, member of US House of Representatives
- Yuri Lowenthal, American voice actor
- Maynard Plant, Japan-based Canadian musician
- Linus Power, Australian politician
- Malena Watrous, American writer

== See also ==
- EPIK, a similar programme in South Korea
- O-yatoi gaikokujin, foreign consultants hired by the Japanese government in the late 19th century
- Technical Intern Training Program, Japanese government administered foreign worker program for industrial and agricultural trainees.
