= Evendine College =

Former chain of London colleges

- Active: Unknown–June 13, 2003

Evendine College was a chain of TEFL schools, operating five campuses in London, England, and satellite schools in Brazil and Poland. It was exposed by the Evening Standard for providing false information to immigration authorities, and allowing registered students to work illegally.

== Closure ==
While under investigation by the Home Office, Evendine closed its doors without warning on 13 June 2003. Allegations indicate that the school allowed students to obtain work visas, despite enrollees admitting that they would not be attending classes. The staff was left without pay, and an estimated 3000 students lost their tuition for the term, as well as money paid for lodging with British families. The closure has spawned concerns about regulation in the private sector.

== See also ==
- Language education
