= Lucy Bella Earl =

British YouTube teacher of English as a foreign language (born 1994)

Lucy Bella Earl Simkins
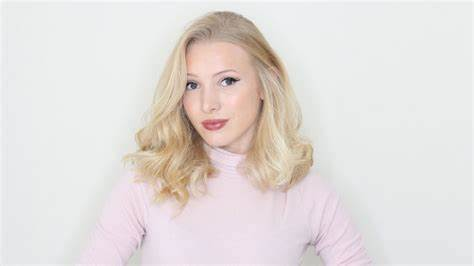
- Born: Lucy Bella Earl; 10 June 1994 (age 32)
- Occupation: Teacher of English as a foreign language
- Spouse: William Simkins

YouTube information
- Channel: English with Lucy
- Years active: 2016–present
- Genre: Education
- Subscribers: 14.3 million
- Views: 647 million
- Last updated: 07 November 2026
- Website: English with Lucy

Lucy Bella Simkins (née Earl) (born 10 June 1994), is a British teacher of English as a foreign language and the creator of the educational channel 'English with Lucy' on YouTube. She was given the British Council ELTon Award for Innovation in English language teaching in 2017 and the Entrepreneurial Award by the University of Westminster in 2018.

== YouTube career ==
Lucy Bella Earl studied at the University of Westminster, from which she graduated in 2016 with a BA in Marketing Communications. As part of the Erasmus programme, she studied in Madrid, Spain. In Seville, she qualified to teach English as a foreign language and started working in her new profession.

In 2016, in her final year of university, Earl launched her educational YouTube channel ‘English with Lucy’. Within its first year of operation, the channel was followed by 100,000 viewers and she decided to focus on turning it into a full-time job and business.

In 2018, the channel's followers exceeded one million, and the University of Westminster gave her the Entrepreneurial Award for her online activities. Earl is an entrepreneur, and has been called an edutuber. She deals with various aspects of the English language and culture.

The channel has been featured by The Times, ITV News, BBC News, Business Insider, and Tages-Anzeiger Panorama.

The content of the channel has been explored in academic research, i.e. in Indonesia: at the Maulana Malik Ibrahim State Islamic University Malang (2018), at the Universitas Muhammadiyah Jakarta (2022) in Jakarta, at the Universitas Islam Negeri Raden Mas Said Surakarta (2023) in Surakarta, and at the Jagiellonian University in Poland (2022) and recommended to learners of English. In 2026, German comic duo Katz & Goldt published the cartoon Greetings to Lucy about her work.

Lucy Bella Earl is fluent in Spanish and Italian.

== Awards ==
- 2017, the British Council ELTons Awards for Innovation in English language teaching, The Award for Local Innovation in partnership with Cambridge English Language Assessment - Learner or teacher solutions developed at a local, national or regional level to meet a specific local need and within a specific local context
- 2018, Westminster Alumni Awards, Entrepreneurial Award, the University of Westminster, London, UK
