= Michael Auslin =

American writer (born 1967)

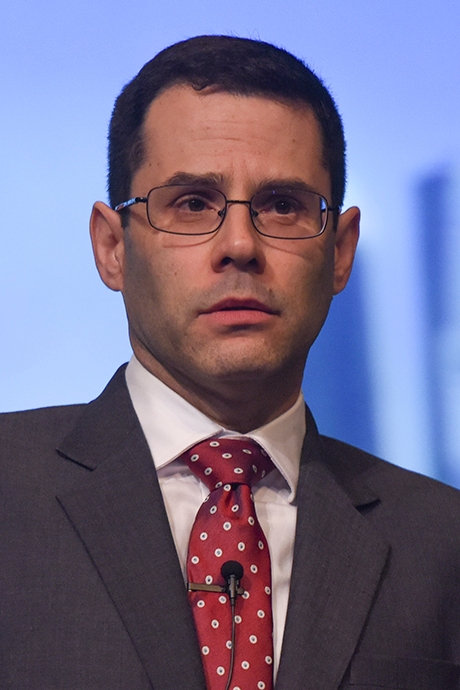
- Michael Auslin in 2017
- Born: Michael Robert Auslin; 17 March 1967 (age 59)
- Education: Georgetown University; Indiana University Bloomington; University of Illinois Urbana-Champaign
- Occupations: Writer; Historian; Policy Analyst

Michael Robert Auslin (born 17 March 1967) is an American historian, writer, and policy analyst, known for his work on U.S-Asian relations. He is currently the Payson J. Treat Distinguished Research Fellow at the Hoover Institution, Stanford University and was formerly an associate professor of history at Yale University. Since 2024, he has published The Patowmack Packet, a Substack containing articles on the history of Washington, D.C.

== Early life and education ==
Auslin grew up in suburban Chicago. He graduated with a BSci from Georgetown University's School of Foreign Service in 1988; received a master's degree from the Russian and East European Institute at Indiana University, Bloomington, in 1991; and was awarded a PhD in history from the University of Illinois at Urbana-Champaign, in 2000. In 1991-92, he lived and worked in Japan as an Assistant Language Teacher on the JET Programme, and he studied at the Inter-University Center for Japanese Language Studies, in Yokohama, in 1995-96.

== Career ==
Auslin was an assistant professor (2000–2006) and then associate professor (2006–2007) in the Department of History at Yale University. In addition, he was also the founding director of the Project on Japan-U.S. Relations (2004–2007) and a senior research fellow at the MacMillan Center for International and Area Studies (2006–2007) at Yale.

In 2005, he was a visiting researcher at the Graduate School of Law of Kobe University and in 2009 was a visiting professor in the Faculty of Law at Tokyo University. After leaving Yale, he was a resident scholar and director of Japanese studies at the American Enterprise Institute, in Washington, D.C. In 2017, he joined the Hoover Institution as the inaugural Payson J. Treat Distinguished Research Fellow in Contemporary Asia. Auslin is the senior advisor for Asia at the Halifax International Security Forum, a senior fellow in the Asia and National Security Programs at the Foreign Policy Research Institute, and was a senior fellow at London's Policy Exchange.

Auslin currently serves on the board of directors of the American Ditchley Foundation and as the vice chair of the Wilton Park USA Foundation.

He was elected a fellow of the Royal Historical Society in 2018, and was named a Young Global Leader by the World Economic Forum in 2006 and a Marshall Memorial Fellow while a professor at Yale. In addition, he was a Fulbright Scholar and Japan Foundation Scholar while in graduate school.

Auslin has testified before the U.S. Senate Committee on Foreign Relations, the U.S House of Representatives Armed Services Committee, and the U.S.-China Economic and Security Review Commission.

== Media ==
Auslin was a regular columnist for the Wall Street Journal, writing on Asia, and continues to publish there as well as in The Atlantic, Foreign Affairs, Foreign Policy, National Review, and The Spectator, among others. He has been a commentator on Fox News, BBC, and for other media outlets, including The News Hour on PBS. He was a featured commentator and script consultant in the 2004 PBS series Japan: Memoirs of a Secret Empire and for Netflix's Age of Samurai, in 2021. Auslin hosted the Pacific Century podcast, in which he interviewed senior policymakers, journalists, historians, business leaders, and others on contemporary Asian issues.

== Select works ==
In a statistical overview derived from writings by and about Michael Auslin, OCLC/WorldCat encompasses roughly eight works in over thirty publications in one language and 100+ library holdings.

- 2024 — The Patowmack Packet Substack (an ongoing collection of articles on the history of Washington, D.C.)
- 2020 — Asia's New Geopolitics: Essays on Reshaping the Indo-Pacific Stanford: Hoover Institution Press.
- 2017 — The End of the Asian Century: War, Stagnation, and the Risks to the World's Most Dynamic Region New Haven: Yale University Press.
- 2011 — Pacific Cosmpolitans: A Cultural History of U.S.-Japan Relations. Cambridge: Harvard University Press.
- 2007 — Japan Society: Celebrating a Century 1907-2007 (with Edwin O. Reischauer). New York: Japan Society. ISBN 9780913304594; OCLC 85766283
- 2004 — Negotiating with Imperialism: The Unequal Treaties and the Culture of Japanese Diplomacy. Cambridge: Harvard University Press. ISBN 978-0-674-01521-0; OCLC 56493769

Journals

- "The Japanese Discovery of America: A Brief History with Documents". The Historian. 61. 1999 – via Questia.

== Honors ==
- Elected Fellow, Royal Historical Society
- Young Global Leader, World Economic Forum
- Fulbright fellow
- Japan Foundation fellow
- Asia Society Asia 21 Fellow
- Marshall Memorial Fellow
- Yasuhiro Nakasone Prize for Excellence, Institute for International Policy Studies, Tokyo
