= Georgia Brass Band =

American music group

The Georgia Brass Band
- Origin: Atlanta, Georgia
- Genres: Brass band
- Years active: 1999–present
- Website: georgiabrassband.com

The Georgia Brass Band was conceived by co-founders Joe Johnson and Christopher Priest in the spring of 1999. It is a traditional British-style brass band. The band performed its first concert in September 1999 and has maintained a very busy schedule ever since.

== History ==
The Georgia Brass Band was conceived by co-founders Joe Johnson and Christopher Priest in the spring of 1999. It is a traditional British-style brass band. The band performed its first concert in September 1999 and has maintained a very busy schedule ever since.

All of the GBB's members and staff volunteer their time and talents to the band. Johnson was the group's conductor from 1999 to 2023. Michael Kobito became its conductor in 2023.

== Instrumentation ==
Instrumentation follows the British tradition of Cornets, 1 in Eb, 9 in B♭, Flugelhorn, Tenor Horns, 3 in E♭, Baritones, 2 in B♭, Euphoniums, 2 in B♭, Tenor Trombones, 2 in B♭, Bass Trombone, 1 in B♭, Tubas (2 in E♭ and 2 in B♭; often called Basses), and Percussion.

== Repertoire ==
The band's repertoire is quite diverse, ranging from the Renaissance and Baroque eras through the 21st century. The music library contains marches, sacred arrangements, popular music, jazz tunes, movie themes, and classical transcriptions. The band also performs a number of concert selections and contest items written specifically for brass band. The brass band's versatile combination of instruments can produce a variety of tonal colors allowing it to perform transcriptions of most musical styles.

== Appearances ==
The Georgia Brass Band has appeared on Atlanta radio and television and performed at schools, churches, concert halls, festivals, music camps, and colleges around the southeastern United States. The band has had several concert performances broadcast on WABE-FM's Atlanta Music Scene program. The band has also appeared with a number of renowned brass soloists, including former Empire Brass trombonist Scott Hartman, Atlanta Symphony principal trombonist Colin Williams, trumpet soloist Vince DiMartino, Chicago Symphony principal trumpeter Christopher Martin and bass trombonist Charlie Vernon, Black Dyke Band (UK) principal cornetist Richard Marshall and principal trombonist Brett Baker, euphonium soloist Steven Mead and former NY Philharmonic principal trumpet Philip Smith. Other notable soloists to have appeared with the band include Patrick Sheridan, Thomas Ruedi, Tormod Flaten, Demondrae Thurmond, David Childs, Chris Gekker, Mark Clodfelter, and jazz artist Ingrid Jensen.

The band is a regular participant in the International Euphonium Institute held annually at Emory University in Atlanta. The band has also been featured at the US Army Ground Forces Band Tuba/Euphonium Conference, the Southeast Regional Tuba/Euphonium Conference, Atlanta Trumpet Festival, the International Trumpet Guild Conference, the International Trombone Festival, the Deep South Brass Band Festival, the Southeast Trumpet Festival, and the Great American Brass Band Festival.

In 2009 and 2012 the band was a featured ensemble at the Georgia Music Educators Association conference in Savannah, GA.

== Competitions ==
In 2006, the Georgia Brass Band became a member of the North American Brass Band Association (NABBA) competing in that year's championship in Louisville, KY. Bands competing in NABBA championships are divided into different levels, or "sections" according to their perceived ability. The highest three levels of NABBA competition are known as the "Championship", "Honors" and "Challenge" sections.

Because the GBB had never competed, they chose to enter as a participant in the Challenge section and promptly introduced themselves to the brass banding world by winning the section with a score of 278.2 out of a possible 300 - nearly 26 points ahead of the 2nd-place band in the section.

In 2007, the band returned to the championships, competing in the higher Honors section. Against the stiffer competition of this section, Georgia fared quite well and finished in second place in the section with a score of 269, three points behind the section's champion.

In March 2008, the GBB competed again in the Honors section and scored an impressive 288.6 points, which was enough to give them their second championship banner in three attempts.

The GBB has gone on to earn second-place finishes in the NABBA First Section (formerly Honors Section) in 2009, 2010 and 2015.

== Affiliations and mentoring ==
The band was a resident ensemble at the now-defunct Dozier Centre for the Performing Arts in Kennesaw, GA, during the 2007 performance season. The band's devotion to the community is proven through their volunteer efforts including free concerts and work with WABE public broadcasting. The band has also served as a mentoring partner to the Georgia Youth Symphony Orchestra Brass Band.
