= Coordinator for International Relations =

In Japan, a Coordinator for International Relations (国際交流員, Kokusai Kōryūin), or CIR, is a participant on the JET Programme residing and working in the country. Although responsibilities for a CIR vary according to their contracting organization, the majority of a CIR's time is spent organizing and assisting various projects related to adjusting Japanese society to an increasingly multilingual, multicultural, and international world. Many of these projects include but are not limited to: international exchange programmes, primary and secondary school visits, language classes, cooking classes, cultural lectures, as well as translating and interpreting. CIRs are employed throughout Japan at international exchange associations, prefectural offices, city halls, town halls, village halls, and boards of education.

JET is administered by Council of Local Authorities for International Relations (CLAIR) and funded by Ministry of Education, Culture, Sports, Science and Technology (MEXT).

== Statistics ==
As of July 1, 2014, there were 364 CIRs, accounting for approximately 8.2% of the 4,465 JET Programme participants.

Prefecture/Designated City	Number of CIRs (2014)
Hokkaido	21
Aomori	16
Iwate	3
Miyagi	4
Akita	11
Yamagata	5
Fukushima	4
Ibaraki	4
Tochigi	4
Gunma	3
Saitama	5
Chiba	3
Tokyo	0
Kanagawa	1
Niigata	8
Toyama	9
Ishikawa	17
Fukui	3
Yamanashi	4
Nagano	5
Gifu	8
Shizuoka	4
Aichi	5
Mie	6
Shiga	5
Kyoto Prefecture	7
Osaka	0
Hyogo	7
Nara	5
Wakayama	2
Tottori	8
Shimane	20
Okayama	1
Hiroshima	3
Yamaguchi	5
Tokushima	7
Kagawa	6
Ehime	5
Kochi	16
Fukuoka	8
Saga	6
Nagasaki	14
Kumamoto	3
Oita	6
Miyazaki	13
Kagoshima	16
Okinawa	6
Sapporo	6
Sendai	2
Yokohama	1
Kawasaki	1
Nagoya City	1
Kyoto	0
Osaka City	2
Kobe	3
Hiroshima City	2
Kitakyushu City	4
Fukuoka City	4
Chiba City	1
Saitama City	0
Shizuoka City	0
Sakai City	2
Niigata City	5
Hamamatsu City	3
Okayama City	0
Sagamihara City	1
Kumamoto City	4
