= Council of Local Authorities for International Relations =

- Formation: 1988
- Purpose: Supporting local internationalisation
- Headquarters: Sogo Hanzomon Building, Chiyoda-ku, Tokyo
- Members: All Japanese local authorities
- Chairman: Mitsuru Yasuda
- Budget: Unknown
- Staff: Unknown
- Website: www.clair.or.jp/e/index.html

The Council of Local Authorities for International Relations (CLAIR) is a Japanese government-affiliated general incorporated foundation established in 1988 to support the international activities of local governments to strengthen international collaboration, particularly around regional development and revitalisation. Its headquarters are in Tokyo and there are domestic branch offices in each prefecture in Japan, as well as a network of overseas offices in major cities around the world.

== JET Programme ==
In cooperation with local authorities, the Ministry of Internal Affairs & Communications (MIC), the Ministry of Foreign Affairs (MOFA) and the Ministry of Education, Culture, Sports, Science and Technology (MEXT), CLAIR manages the Japan Exchange and Teaching (JET) Programme. JET Programme participants are assigned to be Assistant Language Teachers (ALTs), who provide language instruction at elementary, junior and senior high schools; Coordinators for International Relations (CIRs), who engage in local international exchange activities; or Sports Exchange Advisors (SEAs), promoting international exchange through sport. The JET Programme is one of the largest international exchange programmes in the world, acknowledged as an embodiment of public diplomacy, with more than 65,000 participants since it began in 1987. CLAIR is one of the main sponsors of the JET Alumni Association in its respective territories.

== International CLAIR Offices ==
CLAIR's international offices, located in New York, London, Paris, Singapore, Seoul, Sydney, and Beijing, investigate the latest trends in local development and revitalisation policies, on behalf of Japanese ministries and local authorities, promote the JET Programme and a number of other international exchange programmes, and organise Japan-related seminars and sister city relations.

CLAIR participates in such bodies as United Cities and Local Governments and the Council of Europe Intercultural Cities programme. It was also associated with the Asian Network of Major Cities 21.

CLAIR offices in New York, London and Sydney are known locally as the Japan Local Government Centre.
