= Malena Watrous =

American novelist

- Born: San Francisco, California, U.S.
- Education: Barnard College; Iowa Writers' Workshop
- Occupations: Novelist; essayist; short story writer; educator; author

Malena Watrous (born in San Francisco) is an American novelist, essayist, short story writer, educator, and author of numerous magazine articles.

She is a contributor to The San Francisco Chronicle, The New York Times, Real Simple, The Believer, and Salon.

She lives in San Francisco. She attended the University of Iowa Writers' Workshop, was a Wallace Stegner Fellow at Stanford University, and then a Jones Lecturer. She currently teaches at the Stanford Online Writers' Workshop.

Her debut novel, If You Follow Me was released on March 9, 2010. The book has received reviews in The New York Times, The Boston Globe, Ms. Magazine, The Rumpus, and the San Francisco Chronicle.

She lived and worked in Japan as an Assistant Language Teacher on the JET Programme from 1998 to 2000. She attended Barnard College, where she majored in English and spent her free time interning for a food writer.
