= Global Business Brigades =

Global Business Brigades (GBB) is part of Global Brigades, Inc. (GB) which is a secular, 501c3 nonprofit organization that empowers university students and young professionals in North America and Europe to provide communities in developing countries with sustainable solutions in health care, architecture, legal, environmental and micro-enterprise development.

Since 2004, more than 10,000 volunteers have served over 300,000 beneficiaries.

The Global Business Brigades Model

The in country team of GBB first identifies a community of maximum priority considering a set of factors including education, access to running water, health, socio-economic situation, environmental awareness, legal structures and whether or not other organizations have already a presence in the community. Then, the selected community becomes the focus of the business brigades coming to the country. In this way, GBB seeks the sustainability of the support being offered by creating long-term relationships and offering repeated brigades to the same community in search of economic development for the entire community.
