= EPIK =

South Korean English-learning program

English Program in Korea
- Founded: 1995
- Type: Teaching English as a foreign language
- Location: South Korea
- Website: http://www.epik.go.kr

English Program in Korea (EPIK) is a program to improve the English speaking abilities of students and teachers in South Korea, to foster cultural exchanges, and to reform English teaching methodologies in South Korea. It is affiliated with the Korean Ministry of Education and is operated by the National Institute for International Education. Established in 1995, EPIK encourages cross cultural exchange while promoting the development of English language competence for Korean students. The president of the National Institute for International Education Development, Soo-Taek Rhee, states that “through the EPIK program English language education will cultivate open-minded and well-rounded Korean individuals capable of advancing Korea in this age of information and globalization”.

== History ==
Formally created in 1995 under the name KORETTA, EPIK places native-speaker English teachers in Korean classrooms. Currently, participants live and teach in 16 different Provinces and Metropolitan cities. Korean citizens normally refrain from using other languages besides Korean as their primary language as the country is highly monolingual however, the Korean government still sees English proficiency as highly sought after and valuable in economic and political situations. This makes having certified, quality English teachers even more important for native Korean speakers who want to learn English. From 2009 to 2018, more than 1,400 Native English-speaking teachers (NESTs) were employed by the EPIK program on average each year.

The incorporation of the EPIK program in schools has caused debates on what grade-level English should start being taught. When the program started, English was introduced into the 3rd-grade curriculum and was thought to be an important steppingstone in helping to enhance national competitiveness. Since then, many politicians, education experts, and parents have felt that introducing English at that young of an age could hinder children’s comprehension of the Korean language and Korean culture.

== Organization ==
EPIK is overseen by the National Institute for International Education, a division of the South Korean Ministry of Education, Science and Technology. EPIK provides recruitment and Guest English Teacher support from a central office in Seoul. In conjunction with NIIED, Provincial Offices of Education offer assistance with various daily and work related affairs to Guest English Teachers. Participants can seek guidance from representatives at their Provincial Office of Education and from EPIK.

== Teaching Requirements ==
Applicants must meet the following requirements to become a part of the EPIK program.

- The applicant must be from a country where English is the native language such as Australia, Canada, Ireland, New Zealand, the United Kingdom, the United States, or South Africa. Applicants must have resided there for at least 10 years and have studied at the junior high level.
- The applicant must have at least a bachelor's degree and a good command of English. As of 2021, if the applicant's bachelor's degree was not in English or Education, a teaching certificate such as CELTA, TESOL, or TEFL is also required. If these certifications are needed, they may be completed during the application process as long as the applicant will have the certification at least 6 weeks before they are to arrive in Korea.
- The applicant must be in good mental and physical health and must be able to adapt to Korean culture and ways of living.

Once EPIK teachers arrive in Korea, they must participate in a nine-day training course. This course includes lesson planning, classroom management, Korean history and culture, and professional development. Additionally, teachers are given lessons to help them understand current Korean culture and to help make their transition to living in Korea easier.

== Challenges ==
As of 2019 EPIK teachers are facing challenges with their approach to teaching in Korea. The Korean education system is very test-centered, and some teachers feel they are limited in what ways they can teach. Since test scores are often prioritized over the development of English communication skills, EPIK teachers think that it is difficult to implement specific teaching methods and this can limit their impact on students' overall English proficiency. To fully realize the benefits of the EPIK program, systemic changes to the Korean education system will likely be needed to move away from a test-centered approach and toward a more holistic view of English education that values communicative competence.

== See also ==
- JET Programme, a similar program in Japan
