= Guiyang Symphony Orchestra =

Guiyang Symphony Orchestra (Chinese: 贵阳交响乐团; pinyin: Guìyáng jiāoxiǎng yuètuán, abbreviated GYSO) is an orchestra founded in Guiyang, Guizhou province, China on February 19, 2009, Its inaugural concert was held on September 19, 2009 conducted by Artistic Directors Chen Zuohuang and Li Xincao. The orchestra's current Musical and Artistic Director is the Italian-American conductor Rico Saccani, whose previous engagements include leading the Budapest Philharmonic Orchestra as well as many engagements as a guest conductor across Europe and Asia.

GYSO is a professional orchestra in Guiyang, People's Republic of China (PRC), organized under the auspices of the Cultural Institute of the Guiyang People’s Government and Xingli Group ( a largest retail group in Guizhou Province). The orchestra's current artistic director is Chen Zuohuang.

GYSO will be participating in many major performances. GYSO will organize many tours outside Guiyang. It has been the “Cultural Representative” of Guiyang.
