= Office of Industrial Relations =

Agency overview
- Jurisdiction: The State of Queensland
- Minister responsible: Jarrod Bleijie, Minister for Industrial Relations
- Child agencies: Workplace Health and Safety Queensland; The Workers' Compensation Regulator; Electrical Safety Office
- Website: www.worksafe.qld.gov.au

The Office of Industrial Relations is a Queensland Government agency with responsibility for coordination and regulation of workplace health and safety, electrical safety, and workers' compensation regulation in the state of Queensland, Australia. The agency coordinates administration of the Workplace Health and Safety Queensland, The Workers' Compensation Regulator, and the Electrical Safety Office.

The agency is responsible to the Minister for Industrial Relations, presently the Hon. Jarrod Bleijie MP.

== Electrical Safety Office ==
The Electrical Safety Act 2002 established the Electrical Safety Board, a separate statutory authority, supported by the Electrical Safety Office (ESO). The Board gives advice and makes recommendations to the Minister for Employment and Industrial Relations about policies, strategies and legislative arrangements for electrical safety.

The new legislation had a measurable impact on serious electrical injuries and fatalities from people coming into contact. Queensland's five-year average of electrical fatalities per million of population has declined from 3.6 in 2001 to just 1.24 as at 30 June 2005 – well below Australia's national average.

In the period July 1996 to June 2002, 65 fatalities were reported. In the three years following, there were only ten.

== See also ==
- List of Queensland government agencies
