= Dogme language teaching =

English teaching method

Dogme language teaching is considered to be both a methodology and a movement. Dogme is a communicative approach to language teaching that encourages teaching without published textbooks and focuses instead on conversational communication among learners and teacher. It has its roots in an article by the language education author, Scott Thornbury. The Dogme approach is also referred to as "Dogme ELT", which reflects its origins in the ELT (English language teaching) sector. Although Dogme language teaching gained its name from an analogy with the Dogme 95 film movement (initiated by Lars von Trier) in which the directors, actors, and actresses commit a "vow of chastity" to minimize their reliance on special effects that may create unauthentic feelings from the viewers, the connection is not considered close.

== Key principles ==
Dogme has ten key principles.

1. Interactivity: the most direct route to learning is to be found in the interactivity between teachers and students and amongst the students themselves.
2. Engagement: students are most engaged by content they have created themselves.
3. Dialogic processes: learning is social and dialogic, where knowledge is co-constructed.
4. Scaffolded conversations: learning takes place through conversations, where the learner and teacher co-construct the knowledge and skills.
5. Emergence: language and grammar emerge from the learning process. This is seen as distinct from the 'acquisition' of language.
6. Affordances: the teacher's role is to optimize language learning affordances through directing attention to emergent language.
7. Voice: the learner's voice is given recognition along with the learner's beliefs and knowledge.
8. Empowerment: students and teachers are empowered by freeing the classroom of published materials and textbooks.
9. Relevance: materials (e.g. texts, audios and videos) should have relevance for the learners.
10. Critical use: teachers and students should use published materials and textbooks in a critical way that recognizes their cultural and ideological biases.

== Main precepts ==
There are three precepts (later described by Thornbury as the "three pillars" of Dogme) that emerge from the ten key principles.

=== Conversation-driven teaching ===
Conversation is seen as central to language learning within the Dogme framework, because it is the "fundamental and universal form of language" and so is considered to be "language at work". Since real life conversation is more interactional than it is transactional, Dogme places more value on communication that promotes social interaction. Dogme also places more emphasis on a discourse-level (rather than sentence-level) approach to language, as it is considered to better prepare learners for real-life communication, where the entire conversation is more relevant than the analysis of specific utterances. Dogme considers that the learning of a skill is co-constructed within the interaction between the learner and the teacher. In this sense, teaching is a conversation between the two parties. As such, Dogme is seen to reflect Tharp's view that "to most truly teach, one must converse; to truly converse is to teach".

==== Revision to the concept of Dogme as being conversation driven ====
The immutability of conversation as one of the "pillars" of Dogme was called into question by Scott Thornbury himself in a 2020 interview. When asked what might happen should a student not wish to engage in classroom conversation, Thornbury suggested that saying Dogme had to be "conversation driven" might have been a "mistake":

I think one of the mistakes we made was making conversation part of the... "three pillars", and what really should be said, is that Dogme is driven not by conversations, but by texts... texts meaning both written and spoken.

Arguably, this suggestion that Dogme language teaching should be seen as being "text-driven", rather than "conversation-driven", caters to more reflective learners.

Arguments against Thornbury's revision

Calling Dogme text-driven is an empty assertion because text encompasses almost all aspects of language. If any utterances are text, this proposition no longer has the ability to distinguish and no longer has the force to drive this teaching and learning method. Conversation-driven precept in Dogme is just not a technical jargon for a classroom. It is a way to designate the ecological conditions for meaning to be formed in real time between learners and others. Changing the focus to text is to lose the appropriate level of description of the phenomenon to be explained as writing and speaking are interconnected but not totally identical. At this point, Scott Thornbury had a confusion between the carrier of meaning and the process of meaning making. Text is the carrier of meaning. Conversation is the process of meaning making. The original Dogme was born to fight against material dependence. Shifting the axis to text easily pulls practice back into the orbit of material. Then the teacher returns to the worksheet and the closed activity package. Dogme asserts that learning is co-constructed in the flow of interaction. Text is only useful when it is activated as a trace of interaction, not as the center in itself. If we replace conversation with text, we flatten time, reduce the sensitivity of feedback, and impoverish the opportunity for the learner to actively catch up.

In Dogme 2.0 (2025), Quang N. Nguyen argued against the shift from “conversation-driven” to “text-driven” because it both falls into category error and loses the ecological nature of language learning. Conversation is not just a technique but a condition where affordances become visible and activated. From the affordance-based theory, conversation can create students here-and-now needs as it manifests perceptibility (through verbal and nonverbal cues in rhythm, gaze, and gesture), valence (through engagement and active risk), compositionality (through turn-taking and action-sequenced meaning-making), normativity (through rules negotiated on the spot), and intentionality (through learner intention revealed through initiation and response). Text can only contribute when it is dialogized to reopen these affordances, but it cannot replace conversation by itself. So, instead of saying Dogme must be conversation-driven or text-driven, Nguyen and Nguyen and Doan propose that language learning should be affordance-driven: any form of language, whether spoken or written, is only valuable when it operates as an affordance that opens up the possibility of learning in a continuous dialogue between learner, teacher, and environment.

=== Materials light approach ===
The Dogme approach considers that student-produced material is preferable to published materials and textbooks, to the extent of inviting teachers to take a 'vow of chastity' (which Thornbury and Meddings have since pointed out was "tongue-in-cheek") and not use textbooks. Dogme teaching has therefore been criticized as not offering teachers the opportunity to use a complete range of materials and resources. However, there is a debate over the extent to which Dogme is actually anti-textbook or anti-technology. Meddings and Thornbury focus their critique of textbooks on their tendency to focus on grammar more than on communicative competency and also on the cultural biases often found in textbooks, especially those aimed at global markets. Indeed, Dogme can be seen as a pedagogy that is able to address the lack of availability or affordability of materials in many parts of the world. Proponents of a Dogme approach argue that they are not so much anti-materials as pro-learner, and thus align themselves with other forms of learner-centered instruction and critical pedagogy.

=== Emergent language ===
Dogme considers language learning to be a process where language emerges rather than one where it is acquired. Dogme shares this belief with other approaches to language education, such as task-based learning. Language is considered to emerge in two ways. Firstly classroom activities lead to collaborative communication amongst the students. Secondly, learners produce language that they were not necessarily taught. The teacher's role, in part, is to facilitate the emergence of language. However, Dogme does not see the teacher's role as merely to create the right conditions for language to emerge. The teacher must also encourage learners to engage with this new language to ensure learning takes place. The teacher can do this in a variety of ways, including rewarding, repeating and reviewing it. As language emerges rather than is acquired, there is no need to follow a syllabus that is externally set. Indeed, the content of the syllabus is covered (or 'uncovered') throughout the learning process.

== Pedagogical foundations ==
1. First, Dogme is based not only on theories of language teaching and learning but also on progressive, critical, and humanist educational theories. Adopting the Dialogic model, Dogme encourages students and teachers to communicate in order to exchange ideas, which is the prerequisite for education to occur.
2. Dogme also has its roots in communicative language teaching (in fact Dogme sees itself as an attempt to restore the communicative aspect to communicative approaches). Dogme has been noted for its compatibility with reflective teaching and for its intention to "humanize the classroom through a radical pedagogy of dialogue". It also shares many qualities with task-based language learning and only differs with task-based learning in terms of methodology rather than philosophy. Research evidence for Dogme is limited but Thornbury argues that the similarities with task-based learning suggest that Dogme likely leads to similar results. An example is the findings that learners tend to interact, produce language and collaboratively co-construct their learning when engaged in communicative tasks.
3. Another significant milestone that contributed to the birth of Dogme was the introduction of Emergentism. Dogme follows the same idea of language emergence through dialogs, which allows learners to enhance the effectiveness of communication. Later on, through the action of language awareness-raising activities and focus-on-form tasks, learners can refine the interlanguage and get more proximate to the target language

== As a critical pedagogy ==
Although Thornbury notes that Dogme is not inherently seeking social change and therefore does not fulfill generally held criteria for a critical pedagogy, Dogme can be seen as critical in terms of its anti-establishment approach to language teaching.

== Technology and web 2.0 ==
Although Dogme teaching has been seen to be anti-technology, Thornbury maintains that he does not see Dogme as being opposed to technology as such, rather that the approach is critical of using technology that does not enable teaching that is both learner centered and is based upon authentic communication. Indeed, more recent attempts to map Dogme principles on to language learning with web 2.0 tools (under the term "Dogme 2.0") are considered evidence of Dogme being in transition and therefore of being compatible with new technology. However, although there is not a clear consensus among Dogme teachers on this issue (see discussions on the ELT Dogme Yahoo Group), there is a dominant view that the physical classroom will be preferable to attempts to substitute physical presence with communication via digital technology. Dogme can combine with different technological tools as our society is constantly changing. Teachers can combine Dogme philosophy with the other methods such as flipped classrooms or e-learning environments. However, what matters is that Dogme, as critical pedagogy, is transformative and seeks social changes

== Criticism ==
Dogme has come under criticism from a wide range of teachers and educators for its perceived rejection of both published textbooks and modern technology in language lessons. Furthermore, it has been suggested that the initial call for a 'vow of chastity' is unnecessarily purist, and that a weaker adoption of Dogme principles would allow teachers the freedom to choose resources according to the needs of a particular lesson. Maley also presents Dogme as an approach that "[increases] the constraints on teachers". Christensen notes that adoption of Dogme practices may face greater cultural challenges in countries outside of Europe, such as Japan. Questions have also been raised about the appropriateness of Dogme in low resource contexts and where students are preparing for examinations that have specific syllabi.

In general, the criticisms and concerns that Dogme encounters revolve around several major issues: the theoretical foundation of the conversation-driven perspective, the under-preparedness of lesson structure, and the potential pressure on teachers and students in various learning contexts. Dogme can challenge inexperienced teachers who have an inadequate pedagogical repertoire, and limited access to resources. It may also face challenges regarding its applicability in classes of students with low levels of proficiency. Low-level students cannot interact with the teacher and peers effectively in the target language.

Recent academic scholarship has also examined Dogme ELT from the perspective of the post-methods era in language pedagogy, arguing that characterising it chiefly as a conversation-driven approach may oversimplify its theoretical foundations. In their review, Nguyen and Bui suggest that although Dogme aligns with several compatible second language acquisition theories, its emphasis on minimal reliance on prescribed materials and strict conversation-centred practice should be reconsidered in light of broader pedagogical frameworks that integrate multiple modes of interaction and task design grounded in learners’ interests and needs. This perspective highlights gaps in the existing research and points to the potential for Dogme to be situated within a larger, post-method pedagogical landscape rather than defined solely by its original conversational emphasis.
