= Anthony Bianchi =

Japanese politician

- ビアンキ・アンソニー
- Born: August 26, 1958 (age 68); Bensonhurst, New York City, New York, United States
- Citizenship: United States (formerly); Japan
- Education: Xaverian High School
- Alma mater: New York University
- Organization: Inuyama City Council
- Term: Chairman 2003-2006; Member 2003-2023
- Spouse: Keiko Bianchi

Anthony Bianchi (Japanese: ビアンキ・アンソニー, romanized: Bianki Ansonī, born August 26, 1958) is a Japanese politician, who was an American citizen of Italian descent and became a naturalized Japanese citizen in 2002. He is a city councillor of Inuyama, Aichi, and the chairman of Inuyama City council from 2017 to 2019. He is the first naturalized Japanese to serve as a city council top in Japan.

== Background ==
Bianchi was born on August 26, 1958, in Brooklyn, New York. He graduated from Xaverian High School in June 1976. After graduating from New York University in June 1980, he became a member of Embassy Communications.

By the finale of the sitcom The Jeffersons, he left Embassy Communications. Then he worked in the government of New York City. In 1989, he went to Aichi Prefecture, Japan as an Assistant Language Teacher under the JET Program. From April 1996, he worked in the Municipal Board of Education of Inuyama, Aichi. He married a Japanese woman in 2000.

== Political career ==
Bianchi was naturalized in Japan in 2002. He joined in the election for city councilors of Inuyama, Aichi on April 27, 2003, where he was elected at the top of all candidates. After became the city councilor, he called for the disclosure of information by presenting the meetings of city council on television and putting minutes on the homepage of Inuyama, Aichi.

On September 5, 2006, the former mayor of Inuyama, Yoshihiro Ishida resigned after declaring he will join the election for the governor of Aichi Prefecture, Bianchi resigned the city councilor on October 19, by declaring he will join the election for mayor of Inuyama on December 17, but lost.

On May 11, 2017, Bianchi was elected as the chairman of City Council of Inuyama.

In February 2018, a new system called "Residents' Free Speech System", was introduced in Inuyama City Council by Bianchi which let every resident of Inuyama come to the meeting of the city council to leave comments or ask questions. As this system was evaluated by citizens, City Council of Inuyama earned the "13th Manifesto Award" on November 9, 2018.

== Book ==
- 前例より、前進!―青い目の市会議員"奪戦記" (in Japanese). 風媒社. October 20, 2014. ISBN 978-4833111096.
