= Georgia Youth Symphony Orchestra =

The Georgia Youth Symphony Orchestra is a conglomerate of several musical groups under the leadership of the Georgia Symphony Orchestra.

== Groups ==
- Symphony Orchestra - full orchestra
- Philharmonia - full orchestra
- Camerata - string orchestra
- Camerata Winds - starting wind ensemble
- Sinfonia - string orchestra
- Jazz Ensemble
- Percussion Ensemble
- Middle school chorus
- High school chorus

== Mission ==
The mission of the Georgia Youth Symphony Orchestra is to facilitate a lifelong bonding between the participating students and the arts. The hope is that students will continue to frequent concerts, plays, operas, and other sources of culture regardless of their career path.

== History ==
The Georgia Youth Symphony Orchestra and Chorus was founded in Cobb County in 2006. Initial auditions took place in September 2006 under the auspices of the Cobb Symphony Orchestra (which changed its name to the Georgia Symphony Orchestra in 2011).

By the 2007 season, over 160 students constituted GYSO’s full orchestras, Philharmonia and the symphony orchestra, while over 30 students participated in the GYSO Sinfonia. In addition to the three orchestra programs, nearly 30 students participated in an authentic British-style Brass Band and just under a dozen students were in a Percussion Ensemble. In 2009, two choruses were added to the program.

The GYSO has become the largest youth orchestra in the Southeast.
