= Teaching English as a second or foreign language =

Teaching English as a second (TESL) or foreign language (TEFL) and teaching English to speakers of other languages (TESOL) are terms that refer to teaching English to students whose first language is not English. The terms TEFL, TESL, and TESOL distinguish between a class's location and student population, and have become problematic due to their lack of clarity. TEFL refers to English-language programs conducted in countries where English is not the primary language, and may be taught at a language school or by a tutor. For some jobs, the minimum TEFL requirement is a 100-hour course; the 120-hour course is recommended, however, since it may lead to higher-paid teaching positions. TEFL teachers may be native or non-native speakers of English.

TESL and TESOL include English-language programs conducted in English-speaking countries. These classes often serve populations who have immigrated, temporarily or permanently, or whose families speak another language at home. TESL is considered an outdated term, because students may speak more than one language before they study English. TESOL is an umbrella term that includes TEFL and TESL programs, and is widely accepted in the field of English-language teaching.

Students who are learning English in their home country, typically in a school, are EFL (English as a foreign language) students.

== Teaching English as a second language ==
Teaching English as a second language (TESL) refers to teaching English to students whose first language is not English. The teaching profession has used different names for TEFL and TESL; the generic "teaching English to speakers of other languages" (TESOL) is increasingly used, which covers TESL and TEFL as an umbrella term. Both native and non-native speakers train to be English-language teachers. To teach English as a second language to English-language learners (ELLs), passing a written and oral test in English to demonstrate proficiency is recommended but not always required. In California, there is an achievement gap between native and non-native English speakers. English language learners in secondary schools tend to get lower scores in Standard English tests for English Language Arts compared to their peers who are more proficient in English. Combining teaching with traveling is called TEFL tourism.

== Techniques ==
=== Communicative language teaching ===
Communicative language teaching (CLT) emphasizes interaction as the means and goal of learning a language. Despite criticism, it continues to be popular in Japan, Taiwan, and Europe. The Central Board of Secondary Education (CBSE) of India has also adopted this approach in its affiliated schools in the country.

The task-based language learning approach to CLT has gained ground. Proponents believe that CLT develops and improves speaking, writing, listening, and reading skills, preventing students from listening passively to the teacher without interacting. Dogme is a similar communicative approach that encourages teaching without published textbooks, focusing on conversation by learners and teacher.

=== Code-Switching ===
Code-switching is a common communication practice where an individual alternates or shifts between different languages or dialects within the context of their environment in a social setting. It has become a prominent strategy teachers have tended to implement inside the classroom to help promote and enhance English learning and development.

An aspect of code-switching, called multimodal code meshing, describes how the use of multiple models of media, such as images, videos, etc. to help to further improve students' mastery of English in texts. With the use of various media models, students go through a process of visual brainstorming, creating a thought process through imagination and forming mental images, when code-switching between English and another language. This allowed students and learners to express creative freedom and a personalized and driven learning experience which translated to greater connections and understandings to English from a learner's native language.

Additionally, teachers found code-switching valuable for younger students to develop and learn vocabulary in English. Through the linguistic context of sentences and text, students can overtime develop and form connections between vocabulary from their hereditary languages and English. In a study with Spanish-speaking students learning English, researchers found a higher correlation between students who used code-switching and memorization and vocabulary learning than students who did not use them in word pairs with English and Spanish.

Other implementations of code-switching in younger students' English development include collaboration in literary discussion. A student learning English as a second language was placed into groups, primarily speaking and writing English as a first language. Discussing the significance of the text and exploring various themes together. The ESL student was also encouraged to be in groups with other students who speak their primary language, Spanish, and discuss their knowledge of the text together. By entering both groups, researchers found that the dynamics of the English group and their primary language group helped to develop their reading and literary skills/analysis.

Code-switching when learning English as a second language can also be found in post-secondary education. In some countries, the gap in learning English compared to one's native language was greater due to the more significant differences in language structure. In a study with a post-graduate student learning English fluent in Arabic and French, researchers found an emphasis placed on the writer's intercultural awareness through their identity and background while code-switching in the writing, attempting to form a connections with the reader with this form of textualization. However, in some cases, students refrained from using code-switching in the classroom, describing how they believed it was ineffective for complete fluency in English and only suitable for temporary knowledge. Lecturers and professors also refrained from code-switching in lectures and classroom settings, opting towards more open discussion of only English to promote deepened learning and knowledge rather than memorization.

=== Blended learning ===
Blended learning is a combination of multimedia elements (also known as computer-assisted language learning) in a virtual learning environment (VLE) with classroom instruction, a teacher, and peers. It uses technology to provide large amounts of comprehensible input to learners through video and other types of media.

Multimodal learning in classrooms, like video making, can help English-language learning students especially with the rising demand that there is in terms of communication. Through video making, English-language learners (ELLs) are able to practice their literacy skills. There have also been discussions that schools should incorporate the use of multimodal literacies into classroom instruction which would greatly benefit English learning students.

=== Online classroom ===
A TEFL qualification may be received online. Students can enroll in online classes that are accredited by organizations such as the British Council or Cambridge University Press and Assessment. There is no overarching accreditation body for TEFL, and for-profit companies have been known to invent accreditation affiliates.

Study materials are divided into modules on which students are tested. Tutors who provide support can be reached via email. After successfully completing the last module, the student receives a certificate digitally or by postal mail. A number of employers require a TEFL certificate.

=== Sheltered Instruction Observation Protocol ===
The Sheltered Instruction Observation Protocol (SIOP) is a model that has eight components and thirty features. The main goal of the SIOP model is to help English teachers in helping students who are English language learners, but it is often used as a checklist by instructors which has been a critique of the model. Throughout the United States and in the world, the use of the SIOP model has led to positive results among students. The SIOP model also helps expand background knowledge and it can be used in inductive learning environments which as a result can help English learning students academically.

== Teacher qualifications ==
Qualification requirements vary by country and among employers in a country. A number of institutions do not require a degree or teaching certificate, but some require native speakers with a master's degree in TESOL. University degrees in English language and literature or other specialist degrees may also be valuable. Some institutions consider proof of English proficiency, a university degree, and a basic teaching qualification sufficient. The academic qualification may not be paramount; a number of schools are more interested in interpersonal skills. For trainers wishing to enter the academic field, publications about English use can be as important as qualifications. Where there is a high demand for teachers and no statutory requirements, employers may accept otherwise-unqualified candidates. Acceptance depends on the demand for English teachers and the teacher's previous teaching and life experiences. The TEFL industry and language schools have settled on 100 hours of coursework as the minimum standard for a recognized or accredited TEFL course.

Asian countries, particularly Thailand, tend to hire TEFL teachers based on superficial criteria such as race; Caucasian native speakers are preferred. Parents expect an American or British TEFL teacher, and schools will not risk a declining enrollment.

Age or gender requirements might also be encountered. In some countries outside Europe and America (such as Middle Eastern countries), schools might prefer men to women or vice versa and hire teachers in a particular age range – usually between 20 and 40 years of age. In China, age requirements can differ due to provincial-government regulations. People under 19 may be able to teach TEFL, but usually in a volunteer situation such as a refugee camp.

=== TEFL certificates ===
Private language schools are likely to require at least a certificate for the successful completion of a course with a minimum of 100 hours. Programs such as EPIK will offer a higher salary to teachers who have completed any TEFL course, on- or offline, if the course meets the 100-hour-minimum requirement. Internet-based TEFL courses are generally accepted worldwide, particularly in Asia, where the largest job markets are in China, Korea, Taiwan, and Japan. The increase in online TEFL certificates has been criticized.

== Salaries and conditions ==
Salaries depend on education, training, experience, seniority, and expertise. Employment conditions vary by country, depending on the level of economic development and residential desirability. In relatively-poor countries, a low wage may provide a comfortable middle-class lifestyle. EFL teachers often focus on East Asian countries such as China, South Korea, and Japan, where demand is high. The Middle East is often cited as one of the best-paying regions, although better qualifications are usually needed: at least a Certificate in Teaching English to Speakers of Other Languages (CELTA) and one or two years of experience. In the United Arab Emirates (UAE), salaries vary by school (international or public school) and fringe benefits include housing, flights, and insurance.

Teachers may be exploited by employers. Spain has been criticized for its large number of small-to-medium businesses (including TEFL schools) which routinely avoid employees' social-security contributions to maximize profits.

== TEFL by region and country ==
=== Europe ===
Large European cities have established language schools or operated as agencies which send teachers to various locations. September is the peak recruiting month, and many annual contracts run from October to June. Employers prefer graduate students with experience in teaching business English or teaching young learners.

International schools hire experienced, qualified non-EU teachers. Education ministries in France and Spain offer opportunities for assistant language instructors in public schools. Part-time employment is usually permitted with an education visa, which also requires attendance at an accredited EU college, university, institute, or other educational program.

Despite claims by websites which sell courses, state schools often do not accept brief TEFL courses as a substitute for a university degree in English education. In Spain, a foreign teaching degree and passage of a civil-service examination (oposiciones) are required to teach in a state school.

Demand for TEFL is high in countries which more recently joined the European Union, and which tend to have a lower cost of living. Non-EU teachers usually find legal work there with less difficulty. The former Yugoslav countries have seen growth in private TEFL schools, and have recruited Anglophone teachers. Few foreign instructors work in Scandinavia, which has stricter immigration laws and relies on bilingual local teachers.

=== Australia ===
In 2006, the Australian Bureau of Statistics reported 4,747 female English as a foreign language teachers (80.1 percent) and 1,174 male teachers (19.8 percent). Despite the 2008 financial crisis, the number of international students attending universities in Australia remained high.

Four hundred sixty-two thousand international students paid full fees in Australia in August 2013, with students from China and India the two largest markets. International students applying to Australian universities had been required to be tested, and were accepted according to their academic performance and English-language proficiency. Australian universities now provide alternative pathways to higher-education programs to allow international students to improve their English-language and academic preparation. Alternative pathways include foundation studies and intensive English-language courses.

Employment for teachers of English as a foreign language has risen, and was expected to grow strongly through 2017. The number of EAFL (English as a foreign language) teachers in Australia rose to 8,300 in November 2012, and the projected number for 2017 was 9,500. The top three regions in Australia for employment as an EAFL teacher are New South Wales (49.5 percent), Victoria (29.7 percent), and Queensland (7.7 percent).

=== Asia ===
==== Bangladesh ====
English-language teaching in Bangladesh begins at the primary level and continues through high school. Although Bengali is the official state language and the mother tongue of almost 97 percent of the population, English is widely spoken in the country as a result of two centuries of regional British colonial rule and is used in formal day-to-day activities. Almost all colleges and other higher-education institutions provide programs in English language and literature, and the British Council Bangladesh is a branch of the British Council; Bangladesh is part of the Commonwealth of Nations.

==== Cambodia ====
Demand for English teachers in Cambodia has increased. The country has a small population and depends on foreign aid for much of its economic development, however, limiting growth.

Cambodia was ruled by the French from 1863 to 1953, and English was not the primary second language. The country experienced civil war and political turmoil from the 1970s through the 1990s, which devastated the national education system (including second-language study). By 1979 An estimated 90 percent of schools had been destroyed and 75% of teachers were no longer working by 1979; foreign languages were not taught. In Cambodian schools today, however, English is taught from grade seven and is the most popular foreign language studied. Adults can learn English with informal education programs.

Professional, institutional, and governmental motivations exist for teaching and learning English as a foreign language. Studies indicate that the ability to speak English is an important component of transforming the Cambodian standard of living; English speakers are more likely to have better jobs, since the language is used to communicate with international businesses and organizations.

==== China ====
Wang Keqiang wrote in 1986 that TEFL had existed in China for about one hundred years and was subject to the policies and politics of the times. TEFL in China began in the second half of the 19th century with the Westernization movement introduced by Qing dynasty officials. The movement brought Western culture and trade, and some Chinese officials saw the need to learn English. Tongwenguan, the first institute for teaching the language, was founded in 1862 and became part of Beijing Normal University in 1901.

Opportunities exist in preschools, universities, private schools and institutes, companies, and tutoring; Teach For China is an NGO. The provinces and the Ministry of Education in Beijing govern public schools, but private schools have more freedom to set work schedules, pay, and requirements.

English teaching salaries in China depend on a number of factors, including hours, location, fringe benefits and bonuses, public or private sector, and an applicant's qualifications, educational level, and work experience. Salaries have increased due to demand. A standard contract in the public-school system generally entails less than 20 hours of teaching time with weekends off, accommodations, a flight stipend or reimbursement (for one-year contracts), paid public holidays, medical insurance, and Z-visa (work permit) sponsorship. These positions offer a monthly base salary of ¥6,000–7,000 RMB in smaller cities and rural areas. In larger cities such as Beijing, Shanghai, Shenzhen and Guangzhou, these positions offer over ¥10,000 RMB per month due to higher living costs. The private sector is less uniform, with salaries as high as ¥20,000 RMB per month for experienced applicants in major cities. Private positions tend to require more hours, may include teaching in a number of locations, and often require weekend and evening work schedules. Accommodation is not included, but schools typically offer a rent stipend.

English teachers should have a bachelor's degree in any discipline, be at least 25 years old, and have at least two years of work experience. English teachers should be native speakers, with citizenship in the US, Canada, the UK, Ireland, Australia, New Zealand, or South Africa. These rules are often waived due to demand; schools can obtain work permits for teachers who do not meet the minimum standards, although this is less common in the major cities. The Ministry of Education is increasing enforcement of its requirements for foreign English language teachers; enforcement includes fines, suspension, or the closure of non-compliant institutions.

Public schools usually pay during vacations, but not for summer break unless the teacher renews the contract. Many private schools have shorter vacation schedules, and may pay for days allowed for vacation.

Company jobs vary by the number of employees trained. Companies may employ a teacher for one or two classes, or 14 to 16 hours a week. Tutoring also varies, dependent on whether teaching is for a family of students or one family member. Teachers employed by schools usually cannot engage in paid tutoring or any other paid work, in accordance with their teaching contract.

Most teachers contract with schools. Public school contracts are fairly standard, but private schools have their own requirements. Schools try to hire teachers from Anglophone countries; because of demand, however, others with good English-language skills and natural accents may find positions.

There are a number of steps involved in obtaining a visa to teach in China. In February 2017, the legal process for processing and awarding Z visas in China became stricter. Applicants must now have a criminal background check, at least a 120-hour TEFL certification, and a bachelor's degree from a Western university. Before a Chinese employer can issue an invitation letter to work in China, all documents must be notarized in the applicant's home country and verified in China after they are posted to the Chinese employer; this is in addition to the visa process. It can take about three months from receiving a job offer to beginning work in China.

===== Hong Kong =====
A number of English-teaching institutions have opened in Hong Kong; private companies include Headstart Group and English for Asia, but some treat native-speaking foreigners dishonestly. A TEFL qualification has become a prerequisite for entering the government-funded Native-speaking English Teacher Scheme. Housing and other fringe benefits are provided, including holiday pay, participation in the Mandatory Provident Fund, and health insurance. Housing or rental support is the biggest incentive for foreign teachers, since housing costs in Hong Kong are some of the world's highest.

When a teacher is part of the NET scheme, they can move from school to school after completing a (normal) two-year contract. Therefore, a teacher with a strong track record has a lot of opportunities to land an ideal position at a perfect school. Public and private schools are looking for TEFL qualifications listed with the Hong Kong Council for Accreditation of Vocational and Academic Qualifications and the Hong Kong Education Bureau.

===== Macau =====
Missionary schools in Macau were the first to teach English during the early 17th century. Despite its being a former Portuguese colony, about 1.5 percent of Macau's population speak English; the rest speak varieties of Chinese. The most popular foreign language in schools is English, which is usually spoken by those engaged in commerce and tourism.

==== India ====
Beginning in 1759, English has been taught in India. After Hindi, English is the country's most commonly spoken, written, and read language of India; it functions as a link language, particularly in fields such as law, finance, education, and business.

The popularity of English in India has posed problems for the country's regional and traditional languages. Hindi is India's official language, and English is recognized as the country's second official language for governmental work.

==== Japan ====
In Japan, the JET Programme employs assistant language teachers and teaching assistants to work in Japanese high and elementary schools. Other teachers work in private Eikaiwa schools, universities, and as coordinators for international relations (CIRs) in government and on boards of education.

The largest chains are Aeon and ECC, but the sector is not well-regulated. Nova (one of the largest chains with over 900 branches) collapsed in October 2007, leaving thousands of foreign teachers without income or – for some – housing. Agencies are increasingly used to send English speakers to kindergartens, primary schools, and private companies whose employees need to improve their business English. The Japan Association for Language Teaching (JALT) is the largest nonprofit organization for language teachers (mainly native English speakers), with nearly 3,000 members. Japan was praised for its first-wave reaction to the COVID-19 pandemic, and schools were able to hire instructors with business visas for a short time in the fall of 2020. The border was then closed to nearly all travelers in January 2021, except for Japanese nationals and residents. Despite a second wave of COVID-19, some schools hired ESL teachers in the belief that the pandemic would abate.

==== Laos ====
English has been increasingly important in education, international trade, and cooperation in Laos since the 1990s. The government began to promote foreign direct investment, and the introduction of Laos as an observer at ASEAN in 1992 increased the importance of English; the country became a full member of the association in 1997.

==== Mongolia ====
The Peace Corps had 36 volunteers in Mongolia in 2024, many of whom are English teachers primarily teaching in rural areas with a low population density. In Ulaanbaatar, a small number of professional native-English-speakers teach at private institutes, universities, and some schools. In addition to foreign instructors from the major English-speaking countries, Filipinos teach in Mongolian schools, institutes, and large industrial or mining companies.

==== South Korea ====
Demand for native English speakers willing to teach in South Korea is dropping. The number of native English speakers teaching in public schools dropped 7.7 percent in 2013, to 7,011. Most of the nation's provinces are removing foreign English teachers from their middle and high schools. Like Japan, Korea is nurturing a government-run program for teacher placement called the English Program in Korea (EPIK). EPIK reported recruiting 6,831 foreign teachers to work in Korean public schools. There are several associations for English teachers in Korea; the largest one with a significant number of native speakers is Korea TESOL.

Institutions commonly provide round-trip airfare and a rent-free apartment for a one-year contract. On 15 March 2008, visa rules changed; prospective teachers must undergo a medical examination and a criminal background check, produce an original degree certificate, and provide sealed transcripts. On arrival in South Korea, teachers must undergo another medical check before they receive a resident registration number.

Korean labour law provides all workers with severance pay equivalent to one month's salary, paid at the end of a contract. Most job contracts are for one year, and include entrance and exit plane tickets. Citizens of the US, Canada, and Australia receive their pension contributions and their employers' part of the pension contributions on leaving the country. Average 2015 starting pay for those with no previous teaching experience and no degree in the English language was from US$1,800 to $2,200.

There are four main places to work in South Korea: universities, private schools, public schools (EPIK), and private language academies (hagwons). Private language academies (in 2005, over thirty thousand such academies taught English), the most common teaching location in Korea, can be for classes of schoolchildren, homemakers, university students (often at the university), or businesspeople. Hagwons can be small and independent or part of a large chain, and foreigners should be aware of all the education laws of their school of employment before going overseas.

==== Taiwan ====
In Taiwan, most teachers work locally in cram schools (known as bushibans or buxibans). Some are part of chains, like Hess and Kojen; others operate independently. End-of-contract bonuses equivalent to an extra month's pay are not mandated by law (as in South Korea), and are uncommon in Taiwan. It is illegal for foreigners to teach English in preschools or kindergartens, but the practice common and accepted. To teach English and live in Taiwan, one must have an Alien Resident Card supplied to passport holders from native English-speaking countries by hiring schools. ARC candidates must have a bachelor's degree from a university.

Taiwan has an increased need for TEFL and certified teachers in public schools. Qualifications and salaries for public-school positions are based on certifications and experience, with better benefits and salaries than cram schools.

==== Thailand ====
Thailand has a demand for native English speakers and has a workforce in the form of travellers and expatriates attracted by the local lifestyle, despite relatively-low salaries. Teachers can expect a minimum starting salary of about ฿25,000. Thailand prohibits foreigners from most occupations, but many foreign residents can teach English and remain in the country. Qualifications for EFL teachers have become stricter, however, with most schools requiring a bachelor's degree and a 120-hour TEFL course. Although it is possible to find work without a degree in Thailand, a degree makes obtaining a work permit much easier. Working without a degree is often working illegally, exposing teachers to exploitation by employers.

==== Turkmenistan ====
English is learned as a foreign language with Russian at all schools in Turkmenistan.

=== Greater Middle East ===
Saudi Arabia, the United Arab Emirates, and other wealthy Gulf states are the main locations for instructors to work in the greater Middle East. Many positions provide good salaries and benefits such as free housing and flights, but tend to require extensive qualifications (a master's degree in education, English, or linguistics) and experience. An online course accredited by TESL Canada since 2003 is recommended for those who wish to work in the United Arab Emirates. Private academies and university programs, known as Foundation Year or Preparatory Year programs which assist incoming students with academic preparation for university-level academic work, are the main venues of instruction. Some public primary and secondary schools, such as those in Abu Dhabi, have begun to recruit foreign English instructors.

Other West Asian and North African countries offer more modest positions. Amideast and the British Council operate in several countries, providing teaching opportunities in their English-language courses.

English is also taught in Iran, Sudan, and Morocco at the primary-school level, with demand for a lingua franca caused by the media, economic incentives and globalization.

Africa

In Nigeria, one method of teaching English is through the help of using dictionaries. Slowly private schools in Nigeria have been using dictionaries in classrooms. Dictionaries help students who have a lower proficiency in English since the pictures and illustrations are especially helpful to learners. Students connect the words in English and their native language when they use bilingual dictionaries. Some criticism for the use of dictionaries is that it leads students to guess the meaning of words which contradicts the purpose of using the dictionary. A study done in Enugu, Nigeria, showed that 95% of English language learning students agreed with the use of the dictionary being a helpful resource.

=== Americas ===
There has been significant growth in TEFL in the wealthier non-Anglophone countries of North, Central and South America and the Caribbean. Many teachers work in Argentina, Brazil, Chile, Costa Rica, Colombia, Ecuador, Mexico, Peru, Paraguay, Uruguay and Venezuela, and Chile has made becoming a bilingual nation a national goal. The Chilean Ministry of Education sponsors English Opens Doors, a program which recruits English speakers to work in the country's public high schools. Mexico also has increased access to English education. Language learning had not been part of its public-education curriculum, but Mexico said in 2017 that it has a plan to make students bilingual in English and Spanish within two decades. Improvement is expected, since the level of achievement for ESL remains low due to corruption and the lack of a curriculum from the Secretariat of Public Education. Institutions such as Mextesol provide learning opportunities, conferences, and training to help teachers prepare students for the labour force. In the US, a February 2021 study reported that the average hourly rate for private English tutoring was $22.

== See also ==
- Academic English
- Applied linguistics
- Certificate in Teaching English to Speakers of Other Languages
- EF Standard English Test, open-access standardized English assessment tools
- English as a second or foreign language
- English Opens Doors
- Evendine College (defunct 2013)
- Glossary of language education terms
- Language education
- List of countries by English-speaking population
- Second-language acquisition
- Sociolinguistics
- Test of English as a Foreign Language (TOEFL)
- Trinity College London ESOL
