= English Opens Doors =

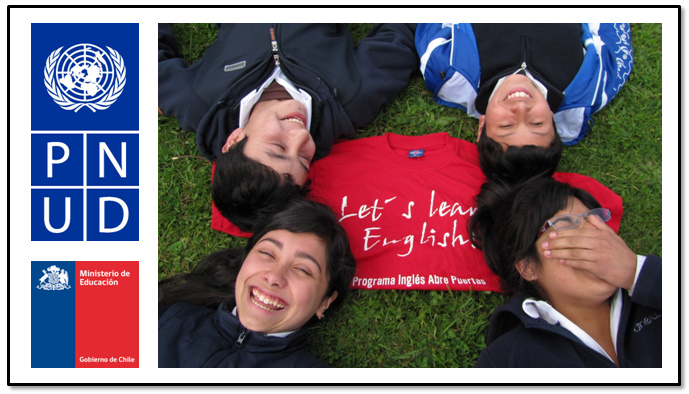
Promotional image of the English Opens Doors program

The English Opens Doors Program (Spanish: Programa Inglés Abre Puertas, pronounced [iŋˈɡles ˈaβɾe ˈpweɾtas]) is an initiative of the Chilean Ministry of Education (MINEDUC) to apply technical expertise and improve English as a foreign language (EFL) teaching, making it more accessible to Chilean people. The English Opens Doors program was launched in 2003 and has been constantly supported since the first government of President Michelle Bachelet.

In 2014, the English Opens Doors Program was transferred from the Curriculum and Evaluation Unit to the Division of General Education. This structural change reflects the Educational Reform of the second Bachelet government, as the Program has been tasked with carrying out the English component of the reform and reaching 1000 schools over the course of Bachelet's term.

== Activities ==
=== National Volunteer Center ===
Sponsored by the United Nations Development Program and the English Opens Doors Program (EODP) of the Ministry of Education, the National Volunteer Center seeks native and near-native English speakers to work as English teaching assistants in public schools throughout Chile. The National Volunteer Center runs a fee-free volunteer program.

The full-time volunteer program began in 2004 with a pilot project consisting of 14 volunteers placed in the Antofagasta Region. The project was evaluated by the Adolfo Ibáñez University Business School. The number of volunteers has considerably extended, and the program now covers all regions of Chile, with the specific focus of benefiting socially-vulnerable school communities. The National Volunteer Center annually recruits approximately 200 - 300 international English speaking volunteers to work in partnership with Chilean English teachers, helping students develop their communicative English abilities through dynamic and game-based learning.

Since 2004, over 2,100 English-speaking volunteers have been assigned to schools in every region of Chile, including the islands of Rapa Nui, Chiloe, and more. Over 650 municipal and state-subsidized private establishments have benefited from the program.

=== English summer and winter camps ===
Total immersion English camps take place during students' summer and winter vacations. Camps are designed to give Chilean public secondary school students the chance to practice English through interactive activities including role-playing exercises, group projects, and competitive games.

=== Debate, public speaking and spelling bee competitions ===
Each year, the English Opens Doors Program sponsors debate competitions for high school students, public speaking competitions for students in year 7 and year 8, and spelling bee competitions for students in year 5 and year 6. Students are expected to prepare and present material entirely in English and to compete at local and regional events in order to advance to the national finals, held in Santiago.

=== Scholarships ===
In 2006, President Bachelet officially announced a government-funded scholarship for undergraduates pursuing an EFL teaching degree at private and public accredited Chilean universities. This scholarship has now been incorporated into Sistema Bicentenario BECAS Chile. The main objective was the creation of a "long-term, comprehensive policy" for professional and academic development abroad. The scholarship enables Chilean undergraduates in their penultimate year of university to improve their English-language skills and become familiar with a foreign culture. It is the only scholarship the Chilean government grants to undergraduate students and is designed 'to provide Chilean schools with high-quality professionals, thereby improving English-language education'.

The destination country must be one in which English is either an official language or is used widely enough that the Chilean student will be experiencing total immersion. All scholarship applicants undergo a rigorous selection process that includes taking an English-language proficiency test such as the TOEFL or IELTS.

=== Professional development for EFL teachers ===
The English Opens Doors Program has developed several strategies to provide EFL teachers in public schools with more professional development opportunities, helping them to improve their English-language fluency and teaching practices. These include English language and methodology courses, local teachers' networks where peers form communities of collaboration, English Summer Town and English Winter Retreat (annual total immersion seminars where foreign professionals share their expertise with EFL teachers), among others.

=== Mandarin Chinese teaching program ===
In 2005, just prior to the China-Chile free trade agreement, the Ministry of Education developed a program that allows educators to incorporate Mandarin Chinese into the curriculum, which is also managed by the English Opens Doors Program. Native Chinese speaking trained teachers spend up to two years at a public or semi-private Chilean school teaching Chinese as a foreign language and developing initiatives such as dialogues and immersion camps.
