= Native-speaking English Teacher Scheme =

Scheme designed to employ overseas teachers in Hong Kong

Native-speaking English Teacher (NET) Scheme
- Chinese: 以英語為母語的英語教師計劃
- Abbreviation: NET Scheme
- Formation: 1998
- Purpose: Language enhancement
- Headquarters: Room 1120, 11/F, Tsuen Wan Multi-storey Carpark Building, 174-208 Castle Peak Road, Tsuen Wan
- Location: Hong Kong
- Fields: Education
- Chief Curriculum Development Officer: Joe LEUNG Kwok Wing
- Parent organisation: Education Bureau
- Website: Official website

Native-speaking English Teacher Scheme
- Traditional Chinese: 以英語為母語的英語教師計劃
- Simplified Chinese: 以英语为母语的英语教师计划
Transcriptions
Standard Mandarin
- Hanyu Pinyin: Yǐ Yīngyǔ wéi Mǔyǔ de Yīngyǔ Jiàoshī Jìhuà
Yue: Cantonese
- Yale Romanization: Yíh yīng yúh wàih móuh yúh dīk yīng yúh gaau sī gai waahk
- Jyutping: Ji5 jing1 ju5 wai4 mou5 ju5 dik1 jing1 ju5 gaau3 si1 gai3 waak6

The Native-speaking English Teacher (NET) Scheme came into operation in Hong Kong in 1998. It is a scheme which allows governmental and government subsidised primary and secondary schools in Hong Kong to employ English teachers from overseas. The aim of the scheme is to provide local students with exposure to authentic English language and to cultural enrichment. NET teachers are also expected to assist with teaching resources development and professional training for English teachers in their schools. At present, there are approximately 800 NET teachers in Hong Kong schools.

NET teachers are employed on a renewable two-year contract basis, they receive a gratuity at the end of each contract and also receive a special allowance which is intended to partially compensate for the additional costs of living overseas.

== See also ==
- Education in Hong Kong
