= International Volunteer HQ =

New Zealand-based volunteer travel company

International Volunteer HQ Limited
- Industry: Volunteer work
- Founded: 2007
- Founder: Daniel John Radcliffe
- Headquarters: New Zealand
- Products: Volunteer Abroad Programs
- Brands: Intern HQ and International Volunteer HQ
- Parent: HQ Travel Group

International Volunteer HQ Limited (IVHQ) is a New Zealand-based volunteer travel company founded by Daniel Radcliffe in 2007. As of 2025, IVHQ has supported more than 150,000 volunteers in over 50 destinations worldwide across 300+ projects.

== Services and activities ==
The organization facilitates affordable and responsible volunteer travel opportunities abroad, with the intent of enabling travelers to explore the world while making a difference. IVHQ focuses on matching volunteers with projects that are community-led and contribute to long-term sustainable impact.

Volunteer projects cover a broad range of skills which include childcare and early childhood education, teaching English, medical and healthcare, wildlife and animal care, environmental conservation, construction and renovation, arts and music, sports development, NGO support, refugee and migration support, women’s empowerment, sea turtle and marine conservation, community development, elderly care, and special needs support.

Since its founding, IVHQ has placed more than 150,000 international volunteers in 50+ countries across Africa, Asia, Europe, Latin America, the Middle East, and the Pacific.

== History ==
IVHQ was started in 2007, when Daniel Radcliffe volunteered in Kenya. His stated goal was to refocus on the basics of volunteer service, which he felt were not being met by other organizations. IVHQ was initially started on his family farm in Taranaki, New Zealand.

By 2025, the company has grown to employ more than 100 staff globally, with offices in New Zealand and internationally. It also includes a sister brand, Intern Abroad HQ, which places interns around the world on career-focused opportunities.

In 2015, IVHQ became an independently certified B Corporation.

In 2022, IVHQ was purchased by founder Daniel Radcliffe, Castlerock, and BlackRock, and it went under the new parent company, HQ Travel Group. Before that, it was working under Mercury Capital.

== Awards and recognition ==
IVHQ has been recognized as a leading volunteer abroad provider. The organization has won the annual GoOverseas Community Choice Award for Overall Top Volunteer Abroad Provider in multiple years, based on verified volunteer reviews. It has also been a frequent recipient of the GoAbroad Top Rated Organization awards, ranking among the highest-rated travel providers in most years.
