= Jane Sunderland =

British linguist and playwright

- Born: 9 September 1952 (age 74); Lancaster, United Kingdom
- Known for: Language and gender; Critical discourse analysis; Identity and language learning
- Children: 1
- Awards: National Teaching Fellowship (2007)

Academic background
- Education: Lancaster University
- Thesis: Gendered Discourse in the Foreign Language Classroom: Teacher-Student and Student-Teacher Talk, and the Construction of Children’s Femininities and Masculinities (1996)

Academic work
- Discipline: Linguist
- Sub-discipline: Language and gender; Critical discourse analysis; Identity and language learning
- Institutions: Lancaster University
- Website: Sunderland on the website of Lancaster University

Jane Sunderland (born 1952) is a British linguist and playwright. She is currently an honorary reader in gender and discourse at the Department of Linguistics and English Language of Lancaster University, United Kingdom. Her research focuses on language and gender, Identity and language learning and critical discourse analysis.

== Career ==
Between 1988 and 1991 Sunderland was a tutor at the Institute for English Language Education, Lancaster University.

Between 2000 and 2012 Sunderland was the director of studies of the PhD in applied linguistics by thesis and coursework at Lancaster University.

On 27 November 2006, Sunderland's analysis on whether women talk more than men appeared on The Guardian. Sunderland's analysis found that there were no substantial differences between the amount of words that both genders used during one day. The analysis questioned the best-selling book, The Female Brain by Louann Brizendine.

Between 2006 and 2008 she was the president of the International Gender and Language Association (IGALA).

In 2007 Sunderland received the National Teaching Fellow award for her work in initiating developing and running the PhD in applied linguistics by thesis and coursework and New Route PhD in applied linguistics programmes.

== Research ==
Sunderland's research focused on language and gender and critical discourse analysis. More specifically, her research concentrates on language and gender in African contexts; the representation of gender and sexuality in children's picture books and in language textbooks; gender and sexuality in the language classroom.

== Awards ==
- 2007: National Teaching Fellowship.

== Publications ==
Sunderland has published in several major journals such as Visual Communication, Language and Literature, Journal of Pragmatics, Gender and Education, ELT Journal, System, Language Teaching Research, Discourse and Society, Language Teaching, Language and Education, Linguistics and Education and Gender and Language.

== Bibliography ==
=== Books ===
- Sunderland, J. (2004). Gendered discourses. Basingstoke: Palgrave Macmillan. doi:
- Sunderland, J. (2006). Gender and language: an advanced resource book. London: Routledge.
- Sunderland, J. (2010). Language, gender and children's fiction. London: Continuum.
- Sunderland, J. (2024). Grasper, Keeper and Flossy: the Bronte family dogs in fact and in fiction. Ethics International Press.

=== Articles ===
- Sunderland, J. (1991). The decline of man. Journal of Pragmatics 16, 505–522.
- Sunderland, J. (1992). Gender in the EFL classroom. ELT Journal 46(1), 81–91.
- Sunderland, J. (1998). Girls being quiet: A problem for foreign language classrooms? Language Teaching Research 2(1), 48–62.
- Sunderland, J. (2000). Baby entertainer, bumbling assistant and line manager: discourses of fatherhood in parentcraft texts. Discourse and Society 11(2), 249–274.
- Sunderland, J. (2000). New understandings of gender and language classroom research: texts, teacher talk and student talk. Language Teaching Research 4(2), 149–173.
- Sunderland, J. (2000). State of the art review article: Gender, language and language education. Language Teaching 33(4), 203–223.
- Sunderland, J., & Mcglashan, M. (2012). The linguistic, visual and multimodal representation of two-Mum and two-Dad families in children's picturebooks. Language and Literature, 21(2), 189–210.
- Sunderland, J. (2012). “Brown Sugar”: the textual construction of femininity in two “tiny texts”. Gender and Language, 6(1), 105–129.
- Sunderland, J., & Mcglashan, M. (2013). Looking at picturebook covers multimodally: the case of two-mum and two-dad picturebooks. Visual Communication, 12(4), 473–496. doi:

== Works ==
- The Lament of Dorothy Wordsworth (2017)
