= Vocabulary learning =

Learning vocabulary in a second language

Vocabulary learning is the process of acquiring building blocks in second language acquisition. The impact of vocabulary on proficiency in second language performance "has become […] an object of considerable interest among researchers, teachers, and materials developers". From being a "neglected aspect of language learning", vocabulary has gained recognition in the literature and reclaimed its position in teaching. Educators have shifted their attention from accuracy to fluency by moving from the grammar–translation method to communicative approaches to teaching. As a result, incidental vocabulary teaching and learning have become one of the two major types of teaching programs along with the deliberate approach.

== Goals of vocabulary learning ==
Vocabulary learning goals help in deciding the kind of language to be learnt and taught. Paul Nation suggests three types of information to keep in mind while deciding on the goals. 1) Number of words in the target language. 2) Number of words known by the native speakers. 3) The number of words required to use another language. It is very difficult to know all the words in a language as even native speakers do not know all the words.

== Types and strategies ==
There are two major types of vocabulary learning: deliberate and incidental. Vocabulary learning types and low-frequency are important components in a vocabulary teaching program. The two major types of vocabulary learning are deliberate and low-frequency. These types are complementary—rather than mutually exclusive—and use different vocabulary learning strategies and their combinations.

Scott Thornbury describes these types by stating that "some of the words will be learned actively", while others "will be picked up incidentally". Dodigovic and Nation emphasize the same distinction—only using a different term for the one side of this dichotomy: deliberate vocabulary learning. Nation also adds another nuance to this concept by calling it "deliberate, decontextualized vocabulary learning". Elgort uses the term deliberate, while DeCarrico prefers to talk about "explicit versus implicit learning". Other authors, although employing various terminology are also in favor of this same distinction. For example, throughout their article, Alemi and Tayebi talk of "incidental and intentional" vocabulary learning, as does also Hulstijn. Expanding the terminology even further, Gu uses the terms explicit and implicit learning mechanisms throughout his article in discussing the second language learning strategies. Whatever terminology is used in the literature by different authors, the two major types of vocabulary learning are discussed: explicit and incidental. These two concepts are not competitors but rather mutually reinforcing.

In both types of vocabulary learning or their combination, the efficiency of learning is achieved by following one or more of the vocabulary learning strategies. Different researchers examine the nature of the concept from various perspectives. Given that vocabulary learning strategies are very diverse, Schmitt suggests a summary of major vocabulary learning strategies and classifies them into five groups: determination, social, memory, cognitive and meta-cognitive. Building on this classification, Xu and Hsu suggest two major categories of vocabulary learning strategies—direct and indirect. The first category includes four types of strategies: memory, cognitive and compensation strategies; the second category contains the meta-cognitive, effective and social strategies. Based on their research, Lawson and Hogben distinguish repetition as the major strategy of vocabulary learning, while Mokhtar et al. explain that ESL students prefer vocabulary strategies such as guessing and using a dictionary.

=== Deliberate vocabulary learning ===
One of the major types of vocabulary learning in language acquisition is deliberate vocabulary learning. Various terminologies are used by different linguists and writers. Elgort and Warren, as well as Schmitt, use the term explicit (which is mostly used for grammar teaching), while Nation uses the word decontextualized vocabulary learning and contrasts the term with "learning from context". without explicitly using the term incidental vocabulary learning. Intentional vocabulary learning, active learning, and direct instruction are also used. However, the term deliberate will be used here to refer to this concept.

The advocates of the deliberate vocabulary learning paradigm—for example, Coady and Nation—agree that context is the main source for vocabulary acquisition. However, they also believe that in order to be able to build up sufficient vocabulary and acquire the necessary strategies to handle the context when reading, learners need support. Thus, extensive reading may be sufficient for developing advanced students' vocabulary, but it has to be supplemented with deliberate vocabulary learning at lower proficiency levels. Kennedy supports this notion and argues that deliberate learning is more appropriate for students with up to an intermediate level of proficiency, while incidental learning, which can occur outside the classroom, is more valuable with higher proficiency students. The limited classroom time should be spent on the deliberate teaching of vocabulary, as the main problem of vocabulary teaching is that only a few words, or a small part of what is required to know a word, can be taught at a time. Ma and Kelly argue that learning a word requires more "deliberate mental effort" than merely being engaged in meaning-focused activities. However, according to the authors, the advocates of deliberate approach believe that it should be combined with incidental learning to be more efficient.

Schmitt demonstrates that deliberate vocabulary learning, unlike incidental learning, is time-consuming, and too laborious. Moreover, according to Nation, deliberate vocabulary learning is "one of the least efficient ways" to improve students' vocabulary knowledge. Yet, he claims that it is a vital component in vocabulary teaching programs. However, Schmitt states that deliberate vocabulary learning gives the learners the "greatest chance" for acquiring vocabulary, as it focuses their attention directly on the target vocabulary. He presents an important concept from the field of psychology: "the more one manipulates, thinks about, and uses mental information, the more likely it is that one will retain that information". The deeper the processing, the more likely it is for the newly learned words to be remembered. Therefore, explicit attention should also be given to vocabulary, especially when the aim is language-focused learning. According to Ellis, while the meaning of a word requires "conscious processing" and is learned deliberately, the articulation of its form is learned incidentally because of frequent exposure. Ma and Kelly mention the necessity of establishing a link between the meaning and form of a word by various strategies, e.g., "direct memorization," which is a strategy of deliberate vocabulary teaching.

In vocabulary teaching programs, it is also necessary to consider the frequency of the words. Thus, high-frequency words deserve to be taught explicitly and sometimes even low-frequency words can be taught and learned deliberately, for example through word cards, word part analysis, and dictionary as recommended by Nation. However, when measuring the difficulty by the results, deliberate vocabulary learning is easier than incidental learning, yet it needs more focused effort. Therefore, directing deliberate attention to the particular aspect can lighten "the learning burden".

In sum, deliberate vocabulary learning is essential to reach a threshold of the vocabulary size and it is a prerequisite to incidental learning.

Retrieval practice and spaced repetition have also been investigated as techniques for deliberate vocabulary learning. Retrieval practice requires learners to actively recall previously studied words rather than merely reviewing them. Research on second-language vocabulary learning indicates that repeated retrieval can contribute to later retention, although the effectiveness of retrieval depends on factors such as the number of retrieval opportunities and the amount of time devoted to practice.Nakata, Tatsuya (2017). "Does repeated practice make perfect? The effects of within-session repeated retrieval on second language vocabulary learning". Studies in Second Language Acquisition. 39 (4): 653–679. doi:10.1017/S0272263116000280.

Spacing is another technique that can be combined with retrieval practice. Rather than concentrating all repetitions in a single learning session, spaced practice distributes learning or retrieval opportunities across time. A review of laboratory studies of adult second-language vocabulary training found that massed repetition alone was generally less effective than approaches that also strengthened connections between word forms and their meanings. The review identified spaced repetition combined with retrieval practice and semantic elaboration as potentially effective approaches to strengthening vocabulary learning.Rice, Caitlin A.; Tokowicz, Natasha (2020). "A review of laboratory studies of adult second language vocabulary training". Studies in Second Language Acquisition. 42 (2): 439–470. doi:10.1017/S0272263119000500.

Word cards and digital flashcards can provide a practical format for deliberate vocabulary learning because they can require learners to recall a word's meaning or form before receiving the answer. This distinguishes retrieval-based practice from simply rereading a translation or definition. Research on second-language vocabulary learning has also examined different retrieval formats, including the effects of retrieval conditions on subsequent vocabulary learning.Nakata, Tatsuya (2016). "Effects of retrieval formats on second language vocabulary learning". International Review of Applied Linguistics in Language Teaching. 54 (3): 257–289. doi:10.1515/iral-2015-0022.

However, retrieval practice should not be equated with repetition alone. Repeated exposure can provide additional opportunities to encounter a word, whereas retrieval requires the learner to attempt to access previously studied information from memory. Consequently, deliberate vocabulary learning activities can differ substantially in their effectiveness depending on whether learners are asked to actively retrieve the target word and how retrieval opportunities are distributed over time.

=== Incidental vocabulary learning ===
Another type of vocabulary learning is called incidental vocabulary learning. By its nature, incidental vocabulary learning is one of the key aspects of language acquisition. This concept, which is also referred to as passive learning or implicit learning, is the process of acquiring vocabulary without placing the focus on specific words to be learned. It is deemed that this type of learning should occur with low-frequency words as the first few thousand words are better learned through deliberate learning approach. However, this may be hampered by the fact that several encounters with a word are needed before it is committed to memory, which may not be possible with low-frequency words. Alemi and Tayebi as well as Schmitt link incidental vocabulary learning with the communicative context. Alemi and Tayebi stress that incidental vocabulary learning occurs by "picking up structures and lexicon of a language, through getting engaged in a variety of communicative activities", while Schmitt indicates that producing language for communicational purposes results in incidental learning.

There are a number of factors which affect the occurrence of incidental vocabulary learning. Most scholars agree that the best way is through extensive reading. Restrepo Ramos indicates that "there is strong evidence that supports the occurrence of incidental vocabulary learning through reading for meaning comprehension". However, as research shows, 95% of the words must be familiar to the reader to understand a text. According to Nation, this figure is even higher, i.e., 98%. Huckin and Coady, on the other hand, argue that "extensive reading for meaning does not automatically lead to the acquisition of vocabulary. Much depends on the context surrounding each word, and the nature of the learner's attention", while Dodigovic finds that it is the approach that matters, i.e., the bottom-up processing of readings is better than the top-down. Thus, to develop incidental vocabulary learning, learners should be exposed to words in different informative contexts, following the bottom-up processing of the readings.

== See also ==
- Language pedagogy
