= Norbert Schmitt =

American applied linguist

- Born: 23 January 1956 (age 70); Mud Lake, Idaho, U.S.

Academic background
- Education: University of Nottingham
- Thesis: Using a Word Knowledge Framework to Research Vocabulary (1997)
- Doctoral advisor: Michael McCarthy

Academic work
- Discipline: Applied linguist
- Institutions: University of Nottingham
- Main interests: Second-language acquisition; Vocabulary learning
- Website: www.norbertschmitt.co.uk

Norbert Schmitt (born 23 January 1956) is an American applied linguist and Emeritus Professor of Applied Linguistics at the University of Nottingham in the United Kingdom. He is known for his work on second-language vocabulary acquisition and second-language vocabulary teaching. He has published numerous books and papers on vocabulary acquisition.

== Research ==
Norbert Schmitt began his career in 1988 as an EFL teacher in Japan and quickly became interested in how language learners acquire their second languages. During his Masters study at Temple University, Japan, he began researching how students learn vocabulary in particular. He extended this interest in vocabulary through his PhD research at the University of Nottingham in 1994. Upon completion of his PhD in 1997, he joined the University of Nottingham staff, and taught there until his retirement in September 2020. He is now Emeritus Professor of Applied Linguistics. Prof. Schmitt has researched second language vocabulary issues for over 25 years, and his interests have broadened to all aspects of lexical study, including vocabulary testing, formulaic language, corpus-based research, and the interface between vocabulary knowledge and the ability to read and listen in English.

A number of his accomplishments include:

• The book Language Power which describes 100 language issues important to the general population

• Nine books on vocabulary and applied linguistics issues (plus two more forthcoming and one contracted)

• Over 60 international journal articles

• Over 100 total article and book chapters

• Introduction of new terminology in the field of vocabulary, including: word knowledge, mid-frequency vocabulary, engagement, form recall, meaning recall

• The introduction of psycholinguistic research techniques like eye-tracking into the study of formulaic language

• Co-development of a standard second language vocabulary test: the Vocabulary Levels Test

• Graduation of over 10 PhD students who are making their own important contributions to applied linguistics

Prof. Schmitt’s background and publications can be found on his personal website at www.norbertschmitt.co.uk

== Publications ==
Prof. Schmitt has published a number of books and many articles in major journals, including Applied Linguistics, Language Learning, Journal of Second Language Writing, Language Testing, System, Studies in Second Language Acquisition, Language Teaching Research, Language Teaching, and Second Language Research.

== Bibliography ==
=== Books ===
- Schmitt, N. & McCarthy, M. (1997). Vocabulary: Description, acquisition and pedagogy. Cambridge: Cambridge University Press.
- Schmitt, N. (2000). Vocabulary in language teaching. New York: Cambridge University Press.
- Schmitt, N. (2002). An Introduction to applied linguistics. London: Arnold.
- Schmitt, N. (2004). Formulaic sequences: Acquisition, processing, and use. Amsterdam: John Benjamins.
- Schmitt, D. & Schmitt, N. (2005). Focus on vocabulary: : Mastering the academic word list. White Plains, NY: Longman.
- Schmitt, N. & Marsden, R. (2009). Why is English like that: Historical answers to hard ELT questions. Ann Arbor, Michigan: University of Michigan Press.
- Schmitt, N. (2010). Researching Vocabulary: A Vocabulary Research Manual. London: Palgrave Macmillan.
- Schmitt, D., Schmitt, N., & Mann, D. (2005). Focus on vocabulary: : Bridging Vocabulary. White Plains, NY: Pearson Longman.
- Schmitt, N. & Schmitt, D. (2020). Vocabulary in language teaching (2nd edition). Cambridge: Cambridge University Press.
- Schmitt, N., Dunn, K., O'Sullivan, B., Anthony, L., and Kremmel, B. (forthcoming in 2022). Knowledge-based vocabulary lists. London: Equinox.
- Schmitt, N. (forthcoming). Language Power.
- Schmitt, N. (contracted). Vocabulary: A Complex, Integrated, Incremental Perspective. Bristol: Multilingual Matters.

=== Articles ===
- Schmitt, N. (1993). Comparing native and nonnative teachers' evaluations of error seriousness. JALT Journal 15(2), 181–191.
- Schmitt, N., & Schmitt, D. R. (1993). Identifying and assessing vocabulary learning strategies. Thai TESOL Bulletin.
- Schmitt, N. (1994). Vocabulary testing: Questions for test development with six examples of tests of vocabulary size and depth. Thai TESOL Bulletin 6(2), 9-16.
- Schmitt, N., & Schmitt, D. (1995). Vocabulary notebooks: Theoretical underpinnings and practical suggestions. English Language Teaching Journal, 49(2), 133–143.
- Schmitt, N. (1995). A fresh approach to vocabulary using a word knowledge framework. RELC Journal, 26(1), 86–94.
- Schmitt, N. (1997). Don't read your papers please. English Language Teaching Journal, 51(1), 54–56.
- Schmitt, N. and Meara, P. (1997). Researching vocabulary through a word knowledge framework: Word associations and verbal suffixes. Studies in Second Language Acquisition 19(1), 17–36.
- Schmitt, N. (1998). Tracking the incremental acquisition of second language vocabulary: A longitudinal study. Language Learning 48(2), 281–317.
- Schmitt, N. (1998). Measuring collocational knowledge: Key issues and an experimental assessment procedure. I.T.L. Review of Applied Linguistics 119-120: 27–47.
- Schmitt, N. (1998). Quantifying word association responses: What is nativelike? System, 26, 389–401.
- Schmitt, N. (1999). The relationship between TOEFL vocabulary items and meaning, association, collocation, and word class knowledge. Language Testing 16(2), 189–216.
- Schmitt, N., & Dunham, B. (1999). Exploring native and nonnative intuitions of word frequency. Second Language Research, 15(2), 389–411.
- Schmitt, N., & Carter, N. (2000). Lexical phrases in language learning. The Language Teacher 24(8), 6-10.
- Schmitt, N., & Carter, R. (2000). The lexical advantages of narrow reading for second language learners. TESOL Journal, 9(1), 4–9.
- Schmitt, N. (2000). Key concepts in ELT: Lexical chunks. English Language Teaching Journal, 54(4), 400–401.
- Schmitt, N., Schmitt, D., & Clapham, C. (2001). Developing and exploring the behaviour of two new versions of the Vocabulary Levels Test. Language Testing, 18(1), 55–88.
- Schmitt, N., & Zimmerman, C. (2002). Derivative word forms: What do learners know? TESOL Quarterly 36(2), 145–171.
- Adolphs, S., & Schmitt, N. (2003). Lexical coverage of spoken discourse. Applied Linguistics 24(4), 425–438.
- Zimmerman, C., & Schmitt, N. (2005). Lexical questions to guide the teaching and learning of words. CATESOL Journal, 17(1), 1–7.
- Schmitt, N. (2005-2006). Formulaic language: Fixed and varied. ELIA: Estudios de Lingüística Inglesa Aplicada, 6, 13–39.
- Pigada, M., & Schmitt, N. (2006). Vocabulary acquisition from extensive reading: A case study. Reading in a Foreign Language, 18(1), 1-28.
- Hemchua, S. & Schmitt, N. (2006). An analysis of lexical errors in the English compositions of Thai learners. Prospect, 21(3), 3-25.
- Phongphio, T., & Schmitt, N. (2006). Learning English multi-word verbs in Thailand. Thai TESOL Bulletin, 19, 122–136.
- Tseng, W-T., Dörnyei, Z., & Schmitt, N. (2006). A new approach to assessing strategic learning: The case of self-regulation in vocabulary acquisition. Applied Linguistics, 27, 78-102.
- Siyanova, A., & Schmitt, N. (2007). Native and nonnative use of multi-word vs. one-word verbs. International Review of Applied Linguistics, 45, 109–139.
- Siyanova, A., & Schmitt, N. (2008). L2 learner production and processing of collocation: A multi-study perspective. Canadian Modern Language Review, 64(3), 429–458.
- Conklin, K., & Schmitt, N. (2008). Formulaic sequences: Are they processed more quickly than nonformulaic language by native and nonnative speakers? Applied Linguistics, 29(1), 72–89.
- Tseng, W-T., & Schmitt, N. (2008). Towards a self-regulating model of vocabulary learning: A structural equation modeling approach. Language Learning, 58(2) 357–400.
- Schmitt, N. (2008). Instructed Second Language Vocabulary Learning. Language Teaching Research, 12(3) 329–363.
- Durrant, P., & Schmitt, N. (2009). To what extent do native and nonnative writers make use of collocations? International Review of Applied Linguistics, 47, 157–177.
- Ishii, T., & Schmitt, N. (2009). Developing an integrated diagnostic test of vocabulary size and depth. RELC Journal, 40(1), 5-22.
- Li, J., & Schmitt, N. (2009). The acquisition of lexical phrases in academic writing: A longitudinal case study. Journal of Second Language Writing, 18, 85-102.
- Al-Homoud, F. and Schmitt, N. (2009). Extensive reading in a challenging environment: A comparison of extensive and intensive reading approaches in Saudi Arabia. Language Teaching Research, 13, 383–401.
- Pellicer Sánchez, A.M. and Schmitt, N. (2010). Incidental vocabulary acquisition from an authentic novel: Do Things Fall Apart? Reading in a Foreign Language 22, 31–55.
- Martinez, R. and Schmitt, N. (2010). Invited commentary: Vocabulary. Language Learning and Technology, 14, 26–29.
- Sonbul, S. and Schmitt, N. (2010). Direct teaching of vocabulary after reading: Is it worth the effort? English Language Teaching Journal 64(3), 253–260.
- Durrant, P. and Schmitt, N. (2010). Adult learners’ retention of collocations from exposure. Second Language Research 26(2), 163–188.
- Khalifa, H. and Schmitt, N. (2010). A mixed-method approach towards investigating lexical progression in Main Suite Reading test papers. Research Notes 41, 19–25.
- Schmitt, N., Jiang, X., and Grabe, W. (2011). The percentage of words known in a text and reading comprehension. The Modern Language Journal 95(1), 26–43.
- Schmitt, N., Ng, J.W.C., and Garras, J. (2011). The Word Associates Format: Validation evidence. Language Testing, 28(1) 105–126.
- Siyanova-Chanturia, A., Conklin, K., and Schmitt, N. (2011). Adding more fuel to the fire: An eye-tracking study of idiom processing by native and nonnative speakers. Second Language Research 27(2), 251–272.
- Saigh, K. and Schmitt, N. (2012). Difficulties with vocabulary form: The case of Arabic ESL learners. System, 40, 24–36.
- Alali, F., & Schmitt, N. (2012). Teaching formulaic sequences: The same or different from teaching single words? TESOL Journal 3(2), 153–180.
- Martinez, R., & Schmitt, N. (2012). A Phrasal Expressions List. Applied Linguistics, 33(3), 299–320.
- Pellicer-Sánchez, A. and Schmitt, N. (2012). Scoring Yes-No vocabulary tests: Reaction time vs. nonword approaches. Language Testing 29(4), 489–509.
- Conklin, K. & Schmitt, N. (2012). The processing of formulaic language. Annual Review of Applied Linguistics, 32, 45–61.
- Sonbul, S., & Schmitt, N. (2013). Explicit and implicit lexical knowledge: Acquisition of collocations under different input conditions. Language Learning, 63(1), 121–159.
- van Zeeland, H and Schmitt, N. (2013). Lexical coverage in L1 and L2 listening comprehension: The same or different from reading comprehension? Applied Linguistics, 34, 457–79.
- van Zeeland, H. & Schmitt, N. (2013). Incidental vocabulary acquisition through L2 listening: a dimensions approach. System, 41, 609–624.
- Uden, J., Schmitt, D., & Schmitt, N. (2014). Can learners make the jump from the highest graded readers to ungraded novels?: Four case studies. Reading in a Foreign Language, 26(1), 1-28.
- Schmitt, N., & Schmitt, D. (2014). A reassessment of frequency and vocabulary size in L2 vocabulary teaching. Language Teaching, 47(4), 484 - 503.
- Schmitt, N. (2014). Size and depth of vocabulary knowledge: What the research shows. Language Learning, 64(4), 913–951.
- González Fernández, B. & Schmitt, N. (2015). How much collocation knowledge do L2 learners have?: The effects of frequency and amount of exposure. ITL International Journal of Applied Linguistics, 166, 94-126.
- Garnier, M. & Schmitt, N. (2015). The PHaVE List: A pedagogical list of phrasal verbs and their most frequent meaning senses. Language Teaching Research, 19(6), 645–666.
- Gyllstad, H., Vilkaite, L. & Schmitt, N. (2015). Assessing vocabulary size through multiple-choice formats: Issues with guessing and sampling rates. ITL International Journal of Applied Linguistics, 166, 276–303.
- Kremmel, B. & Schmitt, N. (2016). Interpreting vocabulary test scores: What do various item formats tell us about learners’ Ability to Employ Words? Language Assessment Quarterly, 13(4), 377–392.
- Macis, M. & Schmitt, N. (2017). The figurative and polysemous nature of collocations and their place in ELT. ELTJ, 71(1), 50–59.
- Garnier, M. & Schmitt, M. (2016). Picking Up polysemous phrasal verbs: How many do learners know and what facilitates this knowledge? System, 59, 29–44.
- Macs, M. & Schmitt, N. (2017). Not just 'Small Potatoes': Knowledge of the idiomatic meanings of collocations. Language Teaching Research, 21(3), 321–340.
- Schmitt, N, Tom Cobb, T., Horst, M., & Schmitt, D. (2017). How much vocabulary is needed to use English? Replication of Van Zeeland & Schmitt (2012), Nation, (2006), and Cobb (2007). Language Teaching, 50(2), 212–226.
- Vilkaite, L. & Schmitt, N. (2019). Reading collocations in an L2: Do collocation processing benefits extend to non-adjacent collocations? Applied Linguistics, 40(2), 329–354.
- Schmitt, N. (2019). Understanding vocabulary acquisition, instruction, and assessment: A research agenda. Language Teaching, 52(2).
- Schmitt, N., Nation, P., & Kremmel, B. (2020). Moving the field of vocabulary assessment forward: The need for more rigorous test development and validation. Language Teaching, 53, 109–120.
- González Fernández, B. & Schmitt, N. (2020). Word knowledge: Exploring the relationships and order of acquisition of vocabulary knowledge components. Applied Linguistics, 41(4), 481–505.
