= Lexical approach =

Method of teaching foreign languages

The lexical approach refers to various methods of teaching foreign languages with focus on lexical units of various sizes. On the smaller end, the lexical approach refers to teaching practices where vocabulary learning sets the preliminary ground for further language learning. Paul Nation, Laufer and others have been influential in this field, with various techniques to quickly expand the student's vocabulary mostly via vocabulary list learning. On the longer end, it requires to understand and produce lexical phrases as chunks, as described by Michael Lewis in the early 1990s. Students are there taught to identify frequent language patterns (grammar), as well as to have sets of words at their disposal.

== Theory ==
The lexical method concentrates on teaching fixed terms that are common in conversations, which Lewis states make up a bigger portion of speech than original words and sentences. Vocabulary is prized over grammar per se in this approach. The teaching of chunks and set phrases has become common in English as a foreign or second language, though this is not necessarily primarily due to the Lexical Approach. This is because anywhere from 55 to 80% of native speakers' speech are derived from prefabricated phrases. Learning these phrases therefore contributes significantly to language fluency.

In 2000, Norbert Schmitt, an American linguist and professor of applied linguistics at the University of Nottingham in the United Kingdom, contributed to a learning theory supporting the lexical approach, in which he stated that "the mind stores and processes these [lexical] chunks as individual wholes." The short-term capacity of the brain is much more limited than long-term and so it is much more efficient for our brain to pull up a lexical chunk as if it were one piece of information as opposed to pulling up each word as separate pieces of information.

== Examples ==
Common lexical chunks include: Have you ever ... been / seen / had / heard / tried?

Most language learners are accustomed to learning basic conversation starters in the form of lexical chunks, including: "Good morning," "How are you?" "Where is the restroom?" "Thank you," "How much does this cost?"

Language learners also use lexical chunks as templates or formulas to create new phrases:

- What are you doing?
- What are you saying?
- What are you cooking?
- What are you looking for?

== Syllabus ==
The lexical syllabus is a form of the propositional paradigm that takes 'word' as the unit of analysis and content for syllabus design. Various vocabulary selection studies can be traced back to the 1920s and 1930s (West 1926; Ogden 1930; Faucet et al. 1936), and recent advances in techniques for the computer analysis of large databases of authentic text have helped to resuscitate this line of work. The modern lexical syllabus is discussed in Sinclair & Renouf (1988), who state that the main benefit of a lexical syllabus is that it emphasizes utility - the student learns that which is most valuable because it is most frequent. Related work on collocation is reported by Sinclair (1987) and Kennedy (1989), and the Collins COBUILD English Course (Willis & Willis 1988) is cited as an exemplary pedagogic implementation of the work, though "in fact, however, the COBUILD textbooks utilize one of the more complex hybrid syllabi in current ESL texts" (Long & Crookes 1993:23).

Sinclair & Renouf (1988:155) find that (as with other synthetic syllabi), claims made for the lexical syllabus are not supported by evidence, and the assertion that the lexical syllabus is "an independent syllabus, unrelated by any principles to any methodology" (Sinclair et al. 1988:155) is subject to the criticism levelled by Brumfit against notional functional syllabi, i.e. that it (in this case, deliberately) takes no cognisance of how a second language is learned. Since these observations were made, however, Willis (1990) and Lewis (1993) have gone some way to provide such a theoretical justification.

== See also ==
- Communicative approach
- Grammar–translation method
- Paul Nation

== Sources ==
- Boers, Frank (2006) "Formulaic sequences and perceived oral proficiency: putting a Lexical Approach to the test," Language Teaching Research, Vol. 10, No. 3, 245-261 doi:10.1191/1362168806lr195oa.
- Faucet, L., West, M., Palmer, H. & Thorndike, E.L. (1936). The Interim Report on Vocabulary Selection for the Teaching of English as a Foreign Language. London: P.S. King.
- Lewis, Michael, ed. (1997). Implementing the Lexical Approach, Language Teaching Publications, Hove, England.
- Lewis, Michael (1993) The Lexical Approach.
- Ogden, C.K. (1930). Basic English: An Introduction with Rules and Grammar. London: Kegan Paul, Trench & Trubner.
- Sinclair, B. (1996). Materials design for the promotion of learner autonomy: how explicit is explicit? In R. Pemberton, S.L. Edward, W.W.F. Or, and H.D. Pierson (Eds.). Taking Control: Autonomy in Language Learning. Hong Kong: Hong Kong University Press. 149–165.
- West, M. (1926). Bilingualism (With Special Reference to Bengal). Calcutta: Bureau of Education, India.
- Willis, J. & Willis, D. (Eds.) (1996). Challenge and Change in Language Teaching. Oxford: Heinemann
- Willis, D. (1990). The Lexical Syllabus. London: Collins.
