= Bonny Norton =

Canadian academic (born 1956)

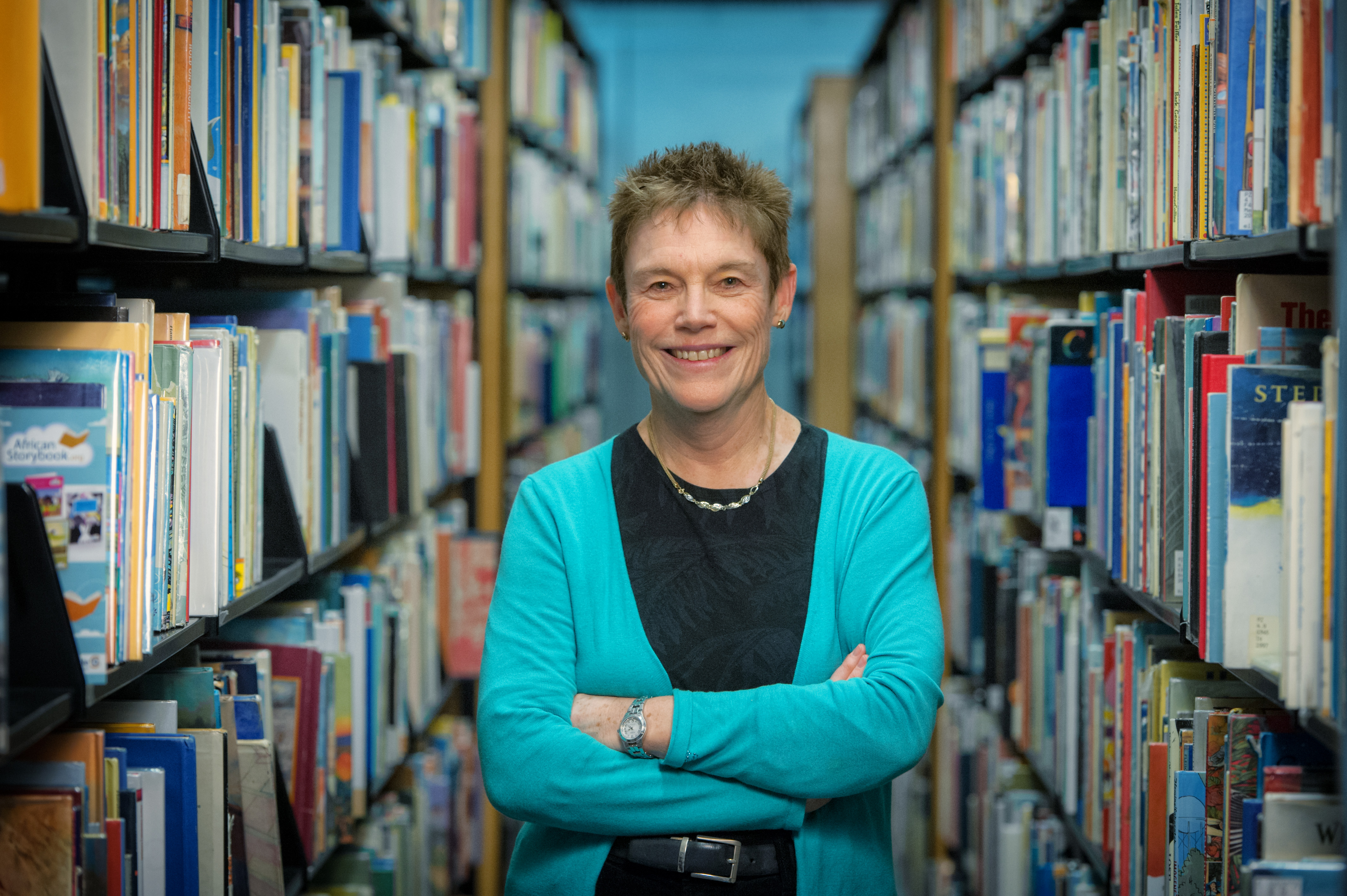
- Born: 1956 (age 69–70); Johannesburg, South Africa
- Known for: identity and language learning, learner investment, mentorship
- Awards: FRSC
- Scientific career
- Fields: language education, applied linguistics, literacy and development
- Workplaces: University of British Columbia
- Website: faculty.educ.ubc.ca/norton

Bonny Norton, FRSC, is a professor and distinguished university scholar in the Department of Language and Literacy Education, University of British Columbia, Canada. She is also research advisor of the African Storybook and 2006 co-founder of the Africa Research Network on Applied Linguistics and Literacy. She is internationally recognized for her theories of identity and language learning and her construct of investment. A Fellow of the American Educational Research Association (AERA), she was the first recipient in 2010 of the Senior Research Leadership Award of AERA's Second Language Research SIG. In 2016, she was co-recipient of the TESOL Award for Distinguished Research and elected a Fellow of the Royal Society of Canada.

== Biography ==
Born in 1956 and raised in South Africa during the turbulent apartheid years, Norton learnt at an early age the complex relationship between language, power, and identity. As a reporter for the student newspaper at the University of the Witwatersrand (WITS) in Johannesburg, she investigated the draconian language policies of the state, which sought to impose the Afrikaans language on resistant African students, precipitating the Soweto Riots in 1976. After completing a BA in English and history, a teaching diploma, and an Honours Degree in applied linguistics at WITS in 1982, she received a Rotary Foundation Graduate Scholarship to do an MA in linguistics (1984) at Reading University in the UK. Thereafter she joined her partner, Anthony Peirce, in Princeton University, US, where she spent three years as a TOEFL language test developer at the Educational Testing Service, and had two children, Michael and Julia. The family moved to Canada in 1987, where Norton completed a PhD in language education (1993) at the Ontario Institute for Studies in Education at the University of Toronto. Prior to her appointment at the University of British Columbia (UBC) in 1996, she was awarded postdoctoral fellowships from the US National Academy of Education Spencer Foundation and the Social Sciences and Humanities Research Council of Canada.

== Research program ==
Norton is centrally concerned with the ways in which language and literacy research can address larger social inequities, while supporting educational change at the grassroots level. Her research seeks to make visible the relations of power that language learners and teachers navigate in diverse classrooms and communities. An advocate for international development, her trajectory of research extends from Canada to sub-Saharan Africa, focussing on a broad range of topics including digital literacy, popular culture, health literacy, language assessment, and teacher education. In 2006, she co-founded the Africa Research Network on Applied Linguistics and Literacy, and is active in the innovative African Storybook in which her former UBC graduate students, Juliet Tembe and Sam Andema, are team members. The ASP is an open-access digital initiative of the South African Institute for Distance Education, which promotes early literacy for African children through the provision of hundreds of children's stories in multiple African languages, as well as English, French, and Portuguese. Its spin-off, the Global-ASP, is translating these stories for children worldwide. In her capacity as Research Advisor of the African Storybook, Norton has worked with Espen Stranger-Johannessen, also of UBC, to initiate the African Storybook blog and YouTube channel to advance this and other projects.

== Recent awards ==
Major recent awards/distinctions include:

- Elected a Fellow of the Royal Society of Canada
- TESOL Award for Distinguished Research, 2016. https://www.tesol.org/enhance-your-career/tesol-awards-honors-grants/tesol-awards-for-excellence-service/tesol-award-for-distinguished-research
- Beijing Foreign Studies University Distinguished Visiting Scholar, 2015
- Vernon Pack Distinguished Scholar and Convocation Speaker, Otterbein University, Ohio, 2015
- Peter Wall Institute for Advanced Studies Distinguished Scholar in Residence, UBC, 2013/2014
- Research Advisor, African Storybook, South African Institute for Distance Education, 2013 to present
- American Educational Research Association Fellow, 2012
- AERA Second Language Research SIG, Senior Research Leadership Award (inaugural recipient), 2010
- Visiting Senior Research Fellow, King's College London, 2007–2010
- Honorary Professor, Education, University of Witwatersrand, South Africa, 2007–2010
- UBC Killam Research Prize, 2007
- UBC Distinguished University Scholar, 2004 to present
- UBC Killam Teaching Prize, 2003

== Selected works ==
=== Books and journal special issues ===
- Norton, B. (Guest Ed.) (2014). Multilingual literacy and social change in African communities [Special issue]. Journal of Multilingual and Multicultural Development, 35(7).
- Norton, B. (2013). Identity and language learning: Extending the conversation. 2nd edition. Bristol: Multilingual Matters.
- Higgins, C. & Norton, B. (Eds.) (2010). Language and HIV/AIDS. Bristol, UK: Multilingual Matters.
- Norton, B., & Toohey, K. (Eds). (2004). Critical pedagogies and language learning. New York: Cambridge University Press.
- Norton, B., & Pavlenko, A. (Eds.). (2004). Gender and English language learners. Alexandria, VA: TESOL Publications.
- Kanno, Y., & Norton, B. (Guest Eds.). (2003). Imagined communities and educational possibilities [Special issue]. Journal of Language, Identity, and Education, 2(4).
- Norton, B. (2000). Identity and language learning: Gender, ethnicity and educational change. Harlow, England: Longman/Pearson Education.
- Norton, B. (Guest Ed.). (1997). Language and identity [Special issue]. TESOL Quarterly, 31(3).

=== YouTube videos ===
- November, 2016: Bonny Norton, FRSC: The African Storybook in the Digital Age.
- November, 2015: British Council YouTube Interview on Language and Identity.
- April, 2014: African Storybook Tribute to Jim Cummins, Toronto.
- February, 2014. UBC Peter Wall Institute talk: "The African Storybook Project: What questions for research?"
- February, 2014: UBC interview, the African Storybook.
- March, 2013: Webinar, Global Conversations in Literacy "Identity, Investment, and Multilingual Literacy (in a Digital World)".
