= Jasone Cenoz =

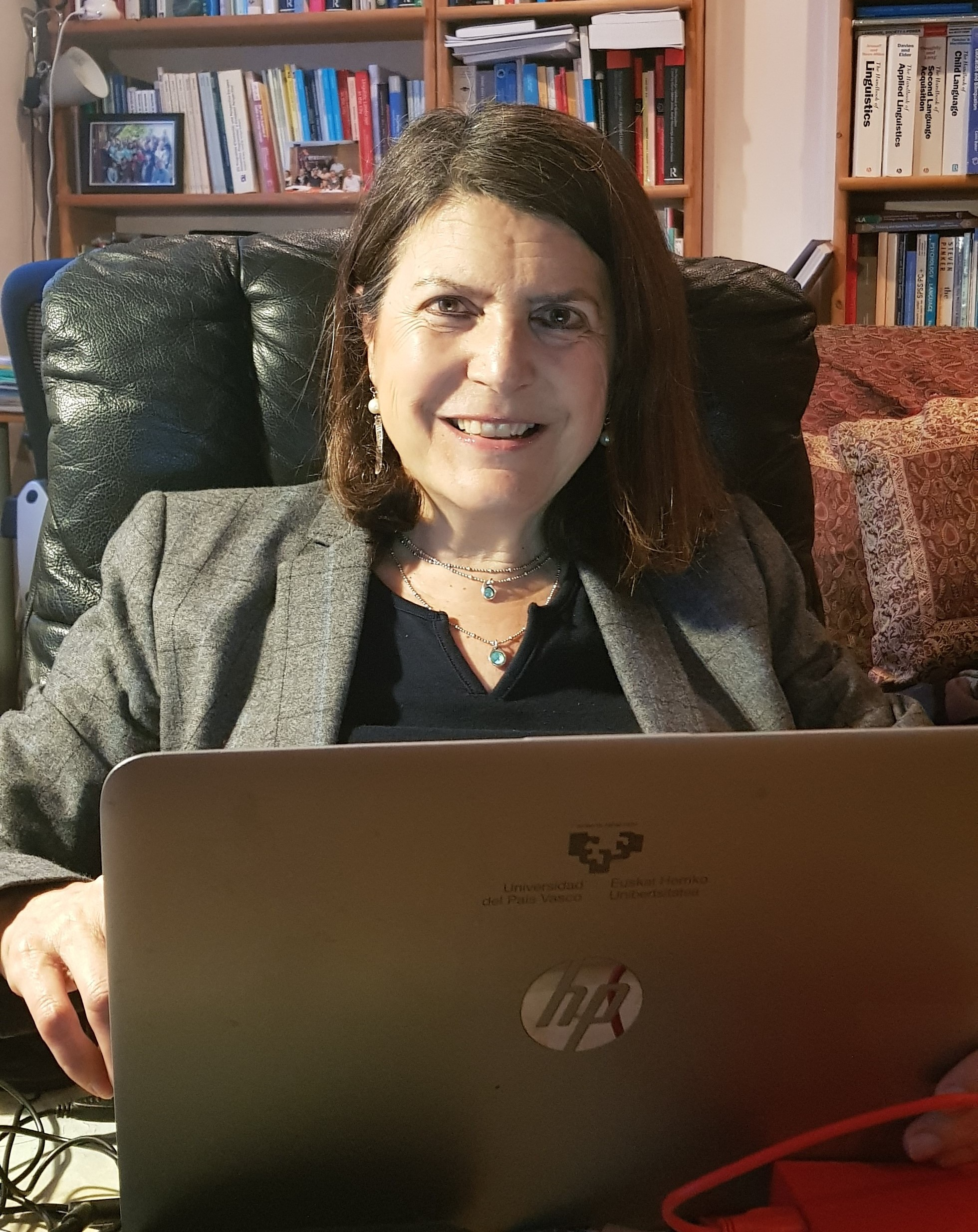
- Occupation: Professor of Education

Academic background
- Education: University of Salamanca, University of Southern California, University of the Basque Country

Academic work
- Institutions: University of the Basque Country
- Main interests: Multilingualism in education, linguistic landscape, minority languages, translanguaging

Jasone Cenoz is a professor of education at the University of the Basque Country (UPV/EHU) University of the Basque Country in Donostia-San Sebastian, Spain since 2004. From 2000 to 2004 she was Professor of Applied Linguistics at the University of the Basque Country in Vitoria-Gasteiz. Her research focuses on multilingual education, bilingualism and multilingualism. She is known for her work on the influence of bilingualism on third language acquisition, pedagogical translanguaging, linguistic landscape, minority languages and Content and Language Integrated Learning. Jasone Cenoz was awarded an Honorary Doctorate (Doctor Honoris Causa) from the Jaume I University (Spain) in 2024.

== Career ==
Jasone Cenoz received her Ph.D. from the University of the Basque Country in 1992. The title of her dissertation was "Teaching and learning English as a second or third language" (Enseñanza-aprendizaje del ingles como segunda o tercera lengua)

She co-founded the International Journal of Multilingualism and was co-editor of this journal from 2004 to 2012. She has been President of the International Association of Multilingualism 2014-2016 and Distinguished Visiting Professor in Graduate Center CUNY New York (2019). She has also been a visiting researcher at different European, North American and Asian universities. In 2023 sge was visiting professor at the University of Chicago Department of Linguistics where she taught a course on Multilingualism and Multilingual Education.

She is a member of the Advisory Board of the Organization of Ibero-American States for Education, Science and Culture (OEI) and a member of the Governing Board of the ISEAK FoundationFoundation ISEAK. She has been a member of the American Association for Applied Linguistics book award committee. and she has been member of the Governing Board of Ikerbasque-the Basque Foundation for Science. Cenoz has supervised numerous PhD students.

== Research ==
Cenoz has worked on different areas of multilingualism in school contexts. She is noted in the field of third language acquisition for her work on Basque-Spanish influence on English as a third language. She currently works on pedagogical translanguaging which is "understood as the use of planned instruction strategies from the learners' repertoire to develop language awareness and metalinguistic awareness" (Cenoz & Gorter, 2020). She also works on linguistic landscape and minority languages

== Publications: Books ==
- Cenoz, J. & Gorter, D. (2023) (eds) Minority Language as a Second Language: Challenges and Achievements. The Minority Language as a Second Language: Challenges and Achievements. Routledge.
- Gorter, D. & Cenoz, J. (2023) A Panorama of Linguistics Landscapes Studies. Multilingual Matters OPEN ACCESS
- Cenoz, J., & Gorter, D. (2021) Pedagogical Translanguaging. Cambridge: Cambridge University Press. OPEN ACCESS
- Cenoz, J., & Gorter, D. (Eds.) (2015). Multilingual education: between language learning and translanguaging. Cambridge: Cambridge University Press
- Gorter, D.; Zenotz, V. & Cenoz, J. (eds) (2014) Minority Languages and Multilingual Education. Berlin:
- Todeva, E. & Cenoz, J. (eds) (2009)The Multiple Realities of Multilingualism. Berlin: Mouton de Gruyter
- Cenoz, J. (2009) Towards Multilingual Education: Basque Educational Research from an International Perspective. Bristol: Multilingual Matters.
- Cenoz, J.; Hufeisen, B. & Jessner, U. (eds) (2003) The Multilingual Lexicon. Dordrecht: Kluwer Academic.
- Cenoz, J.; Hufeisen, B. & Jessner, U. (eds) (2001) Cross-linguistic Influence in Third Language Acquisition Psycholinguistic Perspectives. Clevedon: Multilingual
- Cenoz, J. & Jessner, U. (eds) (2000) English in Europe: the Acquisition of a Third Language. Clevedon: Multilingual.
- Cenoz, J. & Genesee, F. (eds) (1998) Beyond Bilingualism: Multilingualism and Multilingual Education. Clevedon: Multilingual
- Cenoz has published articles in journals such as Applied Linguistics, The Modern Language Journal, Language Teaching, Language, Culture and Curriculum, International Journal of Bilingual Education, Journal of Multilingual and Multicultural System, International Journal of Multilingualism; World Englishes.

== Awards ==
- 2011 Spanish Association of Applied Linguistics (AESLA) book prize her book Towards Multilingual Education: Basque Educational Research from an International Perspective. Bristol: Multilingual Matters.
- 2020 Research award from the University of the Basque Country for her research
- 2022 Research award from Ikerbasque-Basque Foundation for Science and Basque Government Department of Education for recognition of an entire research career
