= Princess Fiona =

Fictional character in the Shrek franchise

- Shrek character
- Princess Fiona as an ogre
- First appearance: Shrek (2001)
- Created by: Ted Elliott; Terry Rossio; Joe Stillman; Roger S. H. Schulman
- Based on: The Ugly Princess from Shrek! (1990 book) by William Steig
- Voiced by: Cameron Diaz (2001–present); Sally Dworsky (2001, singing voice); Renee Sandstorm (2004, 2010; singing voice); Holly Fields (Shrek: Thriller Night, video games)

In-universe information
- Species: Ogre; Human (formerly)
- Gender: Female
- Title: Princess
- Family: King Harold (father); Queen Lillian (mother); Arthur Pendragon (cousin)
- Spouse: Shrek
- Children: Fergus, Farkle, and Felicia
- Abilities: Fighting skills

Princess Fiona is a fictional character in DreamWorks' Shrek franchise. One of the film series' main characters, Fiona first appears in Shrek (2001) as a beautiful princess cursed to transform into an ogre at night. She is initially determined to break the enchantment by kissing a prince or knight, only to meet and fall in love with Shrek, an ogre, instead. The character's origins and relationships with other characters are further explored in subsequent films: she introduces her new husband, Shrek, to her parents in Shrek 2 (2004); becomes a mother by Shrek the Third (2007); and is an empowered warrior in Shrek Forever After (2010), much of which takes place in an alternate reality in which Fiona and Shrek never meet.

Created by screenwriters Ted Elliott and Terry Rossio, Fiona is loosely based on the unsightly princess in William Steig's children's book Shrek! (1990), from which her role and appearance were significantly modified. The screenwriters adapted the character into a princess under a shapeshifting enchantment, an idea initially greatly contested by other filmmakers. Fiona is voiced by actress Cameron Diaz. Comedian and actress Janeane Garofalo was originally cast as the character until she was fired from the first film with little explanation. Fiona was one of the first human characters to have a lead role in a computer-animated film, thus the animators aspired to make her both beautiful and realistic in appearance. However, an early test screening resulted in children reacting negatively towards the character's uncanny realism, prompting the animators to re-design Fiona into a more stylized, cartoonish heroine. Several revolutionary achievements in computer animation were applied to the character to render convincing skin, hair, clothing and lighting.

The character is considered a parody of traditional princesses in both fairy tales and animated Disney films. Reception towards Fiona has been mostly positive, with critics commending her characterization, martial arts prowess and Diaz's performance. However, reviewers were divided over the character's human design, some of whom were impressed by her technological innovations, while others found her realism unsettling and too similar to Diaz. Several media publications consider Fiona a feminist icon, crediting her with subverting princess and gender stereotypes by embracing her flaws. Diaz also became one of Hollywood's highest-paid actresses due to her role in the Shrek franchise, earning $3 million for her performance in the first film and upwards of $10 million for each sequel.

== Development ==
=== Creation ===
Shrek is loosely based on William Steig's children's book Shrek! (1990), but its main characters significantly deviate from their inspirations. According to animation historian Maureen Furniss, changing Shrek's love interest from an ugly princess to a beautiful one is the film's most significant deviations. In Steig's story, a witch foretells that Shrek will marry an unnamed princess, who she only describes as uglier than Shrek himself, inspiring the ogre to pursue her. Described in the book as "the most stunningly ugly princess on the surface of the planet", Steig's princess bears little resemblance to Fiona, but the couple immediately marries with little conflict. In an effort to expand the plot and make its characters more marketable, the film's writers decided to adapt Shrek!'s princess into a beautiful maiden only cursed to become ugly during evenings, which she is forced to conceal from other characters. These changes to the character make the vain Lord Farquaad's interest in Fiona more believable, since he is only marrying a princess to become King of Duloc. According to author Margot Mifflin, Fiona is also written as more of a damsel in distress than Steig's princess.

Feeling that keeping Fiona's curse entirely secret until the end was unsuitable for a feature-length film, screenwriters Ted Elliott and Terry Rossio suggested a shapeshifting princess. At first, the concept was rejected by their peers for six months because they found it overcomplicated for a fairy tale, but the writing partners argued that similar plot points had been used in Disney's The Little Mermaid (1989) and Beauty and the Beast (1991). Instead, Elliot and Rossio began referring to Fiona as an "enchanted" princess. Some writers expressed concern that turning Fiona into an ogre full-time once she professes her love for Shrek implies "that ugly people belong with ugly people", but Rossio explained that her final transformation actually suggests that Shrek already loves Fiona regardless of how she looks. Fiona remaining in her "ugly, bewitched state" retains some of the book's original themes about staying true to oneself, according to journalist Julia Eccleshare, although The Daily Telegraph remarked that Fiona is far from repulsive.

In early drafts of the script, Fiona is born an ogre to human parents, who lock her in a tower to conceal her true nature and lie about her appearance to their subjects. One day, Fiona seeks help from a witch named Dama Fortuna, who offers her a choice between two potions, warning her that only one will turn her beautiful. Fiona selects the wrong potion, entitled "Beauty", and only after drinking it learns that the elixir renders her human during the day before reverting every night. The writers had originally intended for Fiona's backstory to be the film's prologue, but discarded it after test audiences found the scene depressing. Animator Tom Sito had pitched the scene to producer Jeffrey Katzenberg, but recalled that Katzenberg reacted unfavorably. The sequence was storyboarded but never animated. Another abandoned scene, entitled "Fiona Gets Them Lost", follows Fiona, Shrek, and Donkey becoming trapped in a cave after she is rescued, while a third details a physical confrontation between Fiona's ogre form and Shrek, who the latter mistakes for a monster who has harmed her. The fight was discarded because, according to Elliot, some female crew members perceived the violence towards Fiona as misogynistic, reportedly misunderstanding their vision for the action sequence.

Elliott and Rossio had suggested revisiting discussions about whether Fiona's true nature is human or ogre in a potential sequel, but their idea was rejected. Directors and writers spent four months brainstorming several new ideas for the sequel, mapping out plans for Fiona and Shrek's lives post-honeymoon with producer Aron Warner. They ultimately determined that the only logical progression was Fiona's parents reacting to their daughter both marrying and remaining an ogre. Shrek 2 director Kelly Asbury explained that introducing Fiona's parents offered an entirely "new story to go on, and a whole new place to go". Additionally, Shrek 2 reveals why Fiona was locked in a tower in the first place, with the filmmakers realizing they could use some of the first film's abandoned concepts to gradually unveil more details about Fiona's story throughout the series. For Shrek 2, they decided to reimagine Dama Fortuna as Fiona's conniving Fairy Godmother and the sequel's main villain, who uses magic against Fiona and Shrek's marriage.

=== Voice ===
Fiona is voiced by American actress Cameron Diaz, one of the franchise's three main cast members. Diaz voiced Fiona in all four installments of the film series over the course of ten years. The role was originally intended for comedian and actress Janeane Garofalo, who was fired from the first film and ultimately replaced with Diaz. Although Garofalo maintains that she was fired without explanation, it is believed that Fiona's re-casting resulted from the death of comedian Chris Farley, who was originally cast as Shrek and had already recorded most of the character's dialogue until he died during production, at which point he was replaced with actor Mike Myers. According to film historian Jim Hill, the filmmakers originally cast Garofalo as Fiona because they had felt that the actress' "abrasive, sarcastic comic persona" would serve as an ideal foil to Farley's positive approach to the titular character, but eventually relented that Garofalo was "too downbeat" for the film's lighter tone, offering the role to Diaz. With a "sweeter" version of Fiona introduced, Shrek was developed into a more pessimistic character in turn.

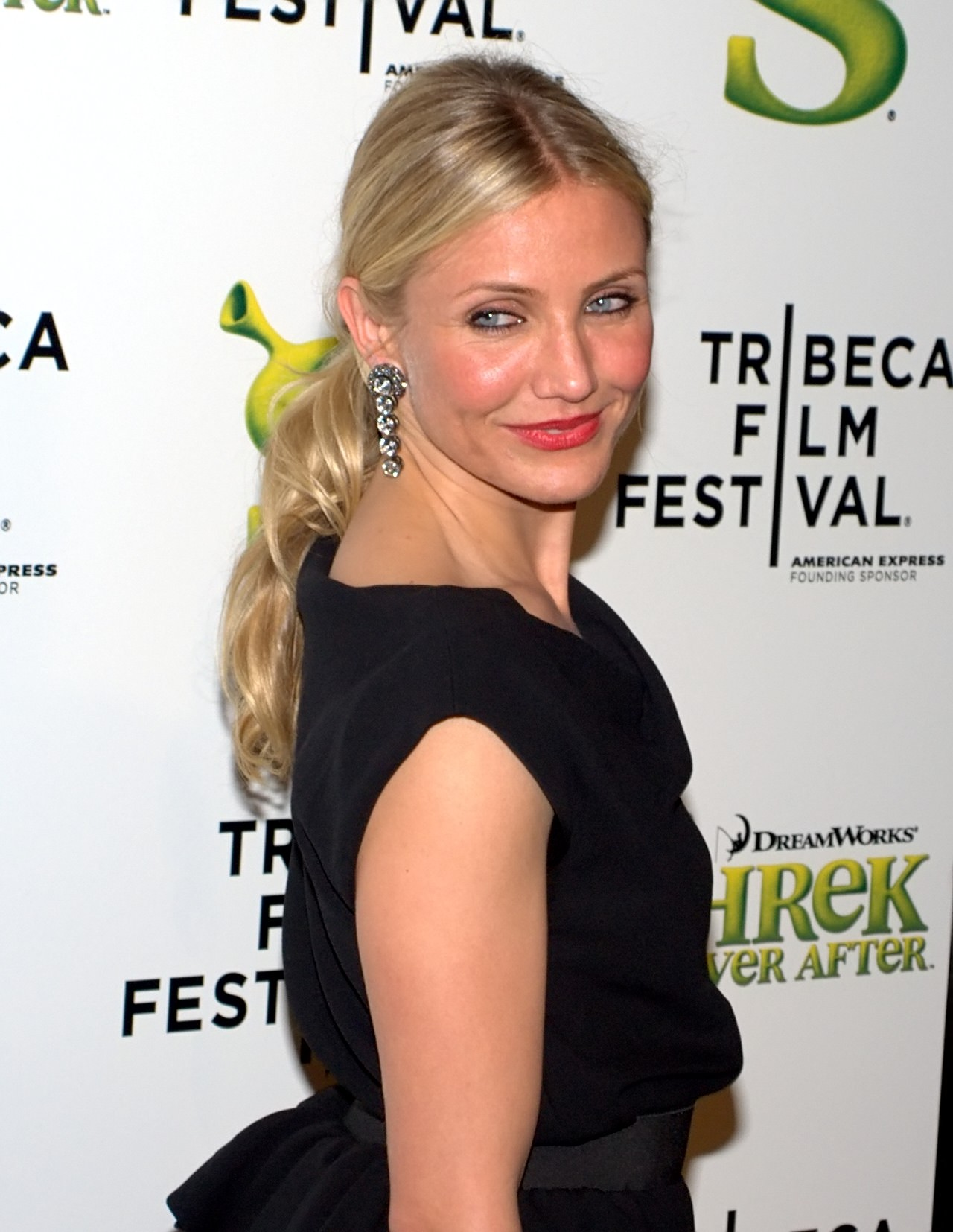
Actress Cameron Diaz (2010) has voiced Fiona for the entire series.

Fiona was Diaz's first animated role. DreamWorks invited Diaz to star in an animated film about an ogre and a princess who learn to accept both themselves and each other. In addition to the film's positive message, Diaz was drawn to the idea of co-starring alongside Myers, Eddie Murphy and John Lithgow. Approaching her role as though it were a dramatic performance, Diaz recorded most of her dialogue before a full script had been written, working closely with director Andrew Adamson to stage scenes before the film had been storyboarded. Prior to Shrek, Diaz starred in the action comedy film Charlie's Angels (2000), a role for which she had undergone martial arts training. While recording the scene in which her character fights Monsieur Hood and his Merry Men, Diaz became quite animated, gesturing and occasionally uttering Cantonese phrases; her martial arts background is credited with benefiting the sequence. Diaz once burped during a recording session, which was written into a scene for Fiona. Without a proper screenplay to aid her, Diaz found the improvisation required for some scenes one of the most challenging aspects of the recording process. The actress did not see the film's completed story until after she had finished working on the project on-and-off for two years, by which point she finally truly understood her "character and ... what she was going through". Myers was both impressed with and inspired by Diaz's commitment to her role, to the point that he felt he was acting opposite Fiona herself. Asbury recalled that Diaz immediately "nailed" her character, elaborating, "She had this certain thing about her voice where she could be headstrong and know exactly what she wants and be confident, but also have this touch of sweet naivete and all make it completely believable." Despite admiring the performances of her predominately male co-stars, Diaz seldom worked directly with them throughout the Shrek series.

Diaz preferred voicing Fiona in the character's ogre form. Apart from the Charlie's Angels sequels, Shrek is the only franchise for which Diaz reprised a role. Because the origins of Fiona's parents had not yet been disclosed in the first film, Diaz voiced Fiona using an American accent. After learning that English actors Julie Andrews and John Cleese has been cast as her parents Queen Lillian and King Harold, respectively, in Shrek 2, Diaz regretted voicing her character with her default Californian accent as opposed to a British accent, calling it one of the few things she would change about her performance. Although admitting that working on the films for only a few hours at a time sporadically sometimes resulted in her feeling as though she is not 100 per cent involved in the process, she takes ownership over the character, explaining, "It's interesting to see something that's not actually tangible so fully embody your essence". Diaz would often defend Fiona's appearance from the press asking how she feels about playing an "ugly" character, finding their opinion shocking and explaining "I love that she is the princess who isn't like all the other princesses. She doesn't look like them, and she's just as beloved and accepted". In Shrek the Third (2007), Diaz co-starred alongside her ex-boyfriend, singer Justin Timberlake, with whom she had broken up the year prior. Timberlake plays her character's cousin Arthur Pendragon, heir to her late father's throne. Shrek 2 includes a brief reference to Timberlake; a picture of a young knight named "Sir Justin" appears in Fiona's childhood bedroom, which is believed to be an homage to their relationship. Diaz was unaware of Timberlake's cameo until watching the film, believing it had been finalized before they became a couple. Although Timberlake was cast as Arthur while he was still dating Diaz, Warner maintains that his involvement was not influenced by their relationship, insisting that Timberlake earned the role based on his own merit and comedic timing. The film's May 2007 premiere in Los Angeles was the first media event at which the former couple had been photographed since the end of their relationship. Director Mike Mitchell denied media speculation that Timberlake and his character's omission from Shrek Forever After (2010) correlated to Diaz and Timberlake's breakup, explaining that Arthur was written out solely to allow more screen time for more relevant characters.

A filmmaker described Diaz as "the rock" of the franchise because "She brings such a great spirit to these movies." Following the release of Shrek Forever After, the series' final installment, Diaz reflected that the Shrek films had remained her "safety net" for several years, describing the period as "a decade of knowing that you finish one and for the next two years we'll be making another one". She remains hopeful for future sequels. Diaz was saddened to bid farewell to her character, admitting that she took the films and Fiona for granted until the end because she always assumed she would be invited back within a few months for another installment. Considering the role "a privilege and honor", Diaz maintains that Fiona is the role for which she is most recognized by children, but she prefers when parents allow them to pretend that her character truly exists without revealing her voice actress, often attempting to prevent parents from exposing the truth. Diaz elaborated that Fiona has become "part of my screen persona. Rather than me putting myself through her I think she comes through me in a weird way. When people think of me they think of Fiona, it's not the other way around." Diaz believes that her popularity has greatly increased since voicing the character. Despite being currently in development, Diaz has yet to confirm whether or not she will reprise her role in a fifth film, although she had previously said that she would return for a fifth installment if asked.

Diaz's role in the Shrek series contributed to her becoming one of Hollywood's wealthiest actresses by 2008. After being paid $3 million for the first film, Diaz originally re-negotiated to receive $5 million for Shrek 2, estimated to be an hourly salary of $35,000. She ultimately earned between $10 and $15 million for reprising her role. For Shrek the Third, it is said Diaz was paid $30 million, her highest salary at that point, due to securing a significant portion of the installment's profits. She earned $10 million for Shrek Forever After. In 2010, Forbes ranked Diaz Hollywood's second highest-earning voice actor, behind only Myers. On the actress' lucrative earnings, filmmaker Herschell Gordon Lewis wrote in an article for the Sun-Sentinel "Sure, she captured the character well. Yes, the 'Shrek' movies invariably are box office successes. But can anyone say that if the voice of Princess Fiona were that of a competent actress other than Cameron Diaz, the movie would have flopped?" Actress Holly Fields has provided the character's singing voice in the film, in addition to voicing the character in several video games, toys, commercials and amusement park rides. Fields is often hired to imitate Diaz, describing the experience as one of her "coolest jobs".

=== Design and animation ===
Fiona is the franchise's female lead and Shrek's romantic interest. Shrek was the first computer-animated film to feature human characters in lead roles, thus director Vicki Jenson believed its heroine should be beautiful yet convincing. Elliott and Rossio had originally envisioned Fiona's monstrous form as furry in appearance, wanting her to resemble an entirely unique character as opposed to simply a female version of Shrek, but the filmmakers struggled to agree upon her final design. Aiming to achieve stylized realism, the animators found that they could emphasize Fiona's face most efficiently by focusing "on the subtleties of the human form" and compiling translucent layers of skin to prevent the character from resembling plastic, a task they found particularly daunting due to people's familiarity with human skin. To make Fiona's skin more believable, the animators studied dermatology books to learn how various light sources interact with human skin, which visual effects supervisor Ken Bielenberg approached as though they were lighting Diaz herself. Bielenberg joked, "You want the sunset to reflect off her face in a way that's flattering ... Fiona may be a computerized princess, but she has her bad side." The animators painted a combination of freckles and warmer tones onto some of her skin's deeper layers, through which they then filtered light. A shader was used to penetrate, refract and re-emerge layers of light, the concentration of which was adjusted to achieve Fiona's desired radiance; they learned that too much exposure resulted in a mannequin-like appearance. The lighting department consulted with makeup artist Patty York to learn different approaches to creating realistic effects on Fiona's face, while the computer graphics software Maya was used to animate her hair, which consists of more than 1 million polygons. The animators felt that Fiona's design was "too real" at times. When the film was previewed to test audiences, some children cried because they found Fiona's hyperrealism disturbing; the character was suffering from a phenomenon known as the uncanny valley. Consequently, DreamWorks ordered that the character be re-animated to appear more like a cartoon and less like a human simulation. Animator Lucia Modesto recalled that her team was instructed to "pull back" on the character's design because her realism was growing unpleasant. Subsequently, Fiona was modified to fit in among the film's more fantastical characters, which supervising animator Raman Hui credits with improving the believability of Fiona and Shrek's relationship. To make Fiona a more "cartoony-looking love interest", the animators enlarged her eyes and smoothed her skin. Hui acknowledged that Fiona was much more difficult to animate as a human because any errors were quite apparent. In total, Fiona's face required a year of constant experimentation before the animators were satisfied with her final design: a realistic yet softer interpretation of the princess.

Director Andrew Adamson admitted that making Fiona beautiful yet viscerally familiar posed several unique challenges for the filmmakers. For example, her eyebrows sometimes cast shadows over her eyes, while her upturned lip and large eyes resulted in a "spooky" appearance. They wanted Fiona's appearance to be relatable without "stick[ing] out among Shrek and the other fantastic characters and distract from the fairy-tale mood." Adamson identified Fiona as the film's most difficult character to animate due to people's familiarity with human mannerisms and expressions, whereas audiences are not nearly as accustomed to talking animals, such as Donkey. Hui maintains that Fiona's appearance was not based on that of any specific individual. Although the animators wanted to avoid making the character resemble Diaz too closely, elements of the actress's movements and mannerisms, which were videotaped during recording sessions, were incorporated into Fiona nonetheless, which they drew onto a different face to create a unique new character. Studying Diaz's mannerisms inspired the animators to exaggerate Fiona's expressions and reactions, instead of striving for realism. For example, Adamson believes Fiona squinting her eyes and compressing her lips while listening to someone else offers "a richness you've never seen before", despite their difficulty to animate. Diaz was shocked and ran out of the studio screaming joyfully when she saw her character animated to her voice for the first time. Although Diaz did not think the character resembles her, she recognized that Fiona shared many of her own mannerisms, likening her to "some kind of strange sister". Fiona's body consists of 90 muscles, but her entire model is made up of more than 900 movable muscles. Even in her ogre form, Fiona is significantly smaller than Shrek, with layout supervisor Nick Walker confirming that Shrek is capable of swallowing Fiona's head whole.

Actor Antonio Banderas, who voices Puss in Boots, originally found it challenging to accept Fiona's unconventional appearance. Banderas believes several audience members experienced a similar struggle watching the film because "We are used to rejecting ugliness without reason". Costume designer Isis Mussenden designed Fiona's costumes for the first two films, helping develop new technology to animate clothing in the then-new computer animation medium. The filmmakers wanted a more realistic approach to costumes than previous computer animated films, in which clothing was typically depicted as a tight layer adorned with a few wrinkles. The filmmakers had envisioned Fiona's velvet gown moving independently from her body, and therefore recruited Mussenden to assist with the process. Mussenden began by creating a one-quarter scale replica of the skirt, and worked with a pattern maker and designer to determine the gown's volume and fullness. The patterns and seams were labeled and forwarded to the animators, who used computers to replicate the images. Mussenden decided to give Fiona's dresses tight sleeves as opposed to the long, flowing sleeves associated with traditional medieval clothing due to the difficulty of animating the latter. Unlike Shrek, Fiona undergoes several costume changes in Shrek 2. To ensure that both Fiona's human and ogre forms look equally flattering in the same green dress, Mussenden lowered its waistline to offer a more medieval appearance than the dress she wears in the first film. Fiona's first costume is a lilac dress, which Mussenden designed to appear "organic and textured, because she's been living in the swamp". Towards the end of the film, she changes into a white ballgown with rhinestones inspired by an image of a 1958 dress the costume designer had found.

The scene in which Fiona single-handedly defeats Monsieur Hood and his Merry Men references the slow motion special effects popularized by The Matrix (1999), as well as Diaz's own Charlie's Angels films. In a DVD bonus feature, Fiona explains that she performed her own stunts in the film, claiming that she based her kung fu on Charlie's Angels. Despite concerns that references to The Matrix would eventually date the film, Rossio believes the gag will remain funny because it is a parody instead of merely an imitation. A similar reference is made when Fiona defeats a mob at the beginning of Shrek 2, a complex sequence for which animators used powerful data processors to store and manipulate millions of computer generated images. Modesto created new character models for Fiona and Shrek in Shrek the Third, while new software and servers were implemented to animate individual strands of the princess's hair much faster than had been possible during production of the first film. In Shrek Forever After's alternate reality, the character wears her hair unbraided for the first time, which was inspired by singer Janis Joplin. Due to its costliness, Fiona's new hairstyle first needed to be approved by DreamWorks, with Mitchell likening the process to "prepar[ing] like a lawyer". The re-design was a difficult, expensive process that required 20 animators to animate each strand individually, as Mitchell was particularly determined to render it correctly due to audiences' familiarity with long hair. One group was specifically tasked with setting up Fiona's hair, which head of production technology Darin Grant believes "allowed the process to be optimized and work across many, many shots" as it "flows and cascades throughout" the entire film, reinforcing Fiona's liberated personality.

=== Personality ===
According to Rossio, the first film's four main characters are written "around the concept of self-esteem, and appropriate and/or inappropriate reactions to appropriate or inappropriate self-assessment", explaining that Fiona seeks validation from others because she believes "there's something not correct about herself". Adamson elaborated that the character's main issue revolves around living up to stereotypes and ideas "represented in fairy tales that if ... you look a certain way and act a certain way and put the right dress and slippers on a handsome man is going to come", dismissing this as an unrealistic and unhealthy approach to finding romance. Diaz confirmed that Fiona only becomes her true self once she is freed from the tower and realizes her Prince Charming differs from who she had been taught to expect.

A scene during which Fiona duets with a bluebird who explodes once the princess sings a high note, subsequently frying its eggs for breakfast, is considered to be a parody of Disney fairy tales such as Cinderella (1950), about which Adamson explained "pok[es] fun at people's expectations" of princesses. Diaz believes her character's personality "shattered" children's perception of princess characters from the moment she was freed from the tower, explaining that Fiona had always been capable of freeing herself but chose to remain in the tower solely because she was "following the rules of a fairy tale book". In the sequel, Diaz explained that Fiona "has a lot of pressure from all the people who told her about Prince Charming to take everything materialistically and monetarily. And she literally is just kind of baffled by it and says, 'Sorry, but I don't need any of those things.' All she needs is this man who she loves and loves her and accepts her." Diaz considers her character to be an empowered, positive role model for young girls, explaining, "She's never depended on anyone to rescue her, which is a different message from Snow White and Rapunzel ... She was capable of getting out of the tower herself" and "took on Shrek as her partner rather than as her rescuer." She believes that the moment she accepts herself as an ogre is her most empowered moment, as well as "the biggest stride in her evolution as a person".

Diaz considers Fiona to be "the anchor that holds all these kooky characters", identifying her as the comedy's straight man. Revealing that she "hate[s] naggy women", Diaz sometimes found herself wishing that Fiona would be "less naggy" and more compassionate and understanding towards the difficult changes Shrek is undergoing since marrying her. During production of Shrek the Third, Diaz observed that the filmmakers had made Fiona into more of a nag and asked that they tone this down, explaining, "just because she got married it doesn't mean she has to become a nag'." This was one of only a few things Diaz asked that they adjust about Fiona. In Shrek Forever After's alternate reality, Fiona frees herself from the tower on her own and subsequently becomes a warrior and leader of an army of ogres, which some commentators found to be a more empowering approach to the princess; Diaz contested that her character has "always been a warrior ... of love through all these films. What she's worked for, what she's fought for is the love that she has for herself and the love that she has for Shrek and her family and her friends." Diaz concluded that, due to the fourth film's tone, Fiona's responsibilities are simply more apparent, believing that in this film she is "fighting for what she believes in."

== Characterization and themes ==
Todd Anthony of the Sun-Sentinel cited Fiona among several elements that make Shrek resemble an archetypal fairy tale initially. Furniss identified Fiona's character arc as struggling with insecurities about her identity and appearance before finally "accept[ing] herself in a so-called 'ugly' physical manifestation", which she described as merely "cute" as opposed to "push[ing] the boundaries of true ugliness." Bob Waliszewski of Plugged In (publication) believes Fiona "has bought into the conventions of fairy tale romanticism hook, line and sinker", writing, "Her skewed perspective on love and marriage undermines agape love and spiritual discernment in relationships." Similarly, TV Guide film critic Frank Lovece described Fiona as a "beautiful and headstrong princess" who has spent too much time thinking about true love. Michael Sragow, film critic for The Baltimore Sun, agreed that the character is "fixated on being treated like a fairy-tale princess", resulting in a precarious outlook on reality. Although Fiona is originally disappointed upon discovering her rescuer is not a Prince Charming, her expectations are more-so grounded in "rituals of self-loathing". Furniss believes Fiona's story is targeted towards Disney films in which princesses are constantly rescued from "horrible fates by knights". However, despite her efforts to look, speak and behave like a traditional princess, Fiona is soon proven to be an nontraditional princess, exemplified by her traits as a skilled fighter, unusual diet occasionally consisting of wild animals and tendency to belch spontaneously.

James Clarke, author of Animated Films - Virgin Film, described Fiona as "both an old-school and new-school heroine, in love with the notion of a charming prince who will rescue her but also tough talking and tough acting". Although she originally possesses traits associated with a traditional princess, being tall and slender, both Shrek and audiences soon agree that Fiona is different, and the princess is merely "following a script from a storybook" herself. Paul Byrnes of The Sydney Morning Herald wrote that Fiona's depiction in the first film offers "a sense of how gender roles had shifted" by resembling "a bottom-kicking heroine". Among her unusual characteristics, John Anderson of Newsday observed that Fiona is "perfectly capable of taking care of herself. She's just been waiting for some classic romance." Although in the context of the film Shrek initially observes Fiona's differences once she belches, "it rapidly also becomes apparent that she is indeed not a prototypical fairy-tale princess", according to authors Johnny Unger and Jane Sunderland. The New York Press observed that Shrek emphasizes "that the ogre falls in love with the heroine not because of her conventional good looks, but in spite of them ... looking past Fiona's skinny, blond human surface and seeing the belching, bug-eating ogre beneath." Journalist Steve Sailer, writing for UPI, similarly wrote that "Fiona wins Shrek's heart by belching, beating up Robin Hood's Merry Men (who act like Broadway chorus boys) with cool "Matrix"-style kung fu, and cooking the Blue Bird of Happiness' eggs for breakfast." Elliot believes that Fiona's storyline explores "the actual prevalence of attitudes about appearance in society", identifying a theme of lacking self-esteem as particularly prevalent with Fiona. Film critic Emanuel Levy shared that "Fiona suffers/benefits from duality", transitioning from a "sexy, opinionated, and feisty" character into an outcast once "her secret is revealed", after which she becomes closer to Shrek. Matt Zoller Seitz, film critic for the New York Press, wrote that Fiona takes the film's metaphor pertaining the people "passing for something they're not" to "a whole different level", explaining, "At first you think she's a standard-issue princess who's willing to let her hair down and hang with the riffraff", describing her as "a modern-day Disney heroine". Seitz also observed "interracial overtones" in Fiona and Shrek's relationship.

PopMatters contributor Evan Sawdey wrote that the Shrek films use Fiona to promote acceptance, particularity the moment she "discovers that her true form is that of an ogre", by which she is not saddened. Believing that Fiona would happily battle and defend whatever she loves or believes in, Diaz identified the character as "the anchor everyone has attached themselves to", to whom Shrek looks to for guidance, which she would not have been able to provide unless she possessed the strength herself. In terms of character development and evolvement, Diaz recalled that, despite having been raised in a "storybook life", Fiona eventually comes to terms with the fact that "her Prince Charming didn't come in the package she thought he would. She's learned to have patience with Shrek, accept him for who he his", particularly going against being taught that her Prince Charming must look and act a certain way. Thus, Adamson considers Fiona to be "an empowering character" for young girls. Unlike Farquaad, Shrek respects Fiona for speaking up for and defending herself. Fiona's final transformation sequence in which she transforms into an ogre permanently is considered to be a parody and critique of the Beast's transformation into a human in Disney's Beauty and the Beast (1991), with Fiona coming to realize that her "true love's true form" is in fact an ogre. Novelist and film critic Jeffrey Overstreet considered it to be "part of society's downfall that we embrace the Princess Fionas when they're glamorous rather than real." Film critic Roger Ebert observed that Fiona is the only princess competing to be Farquaad's bride (opposite Cinderella and Snow White) "who has not had the title role in a Disney animated feature", which he considered to be "inspired by feelings DreamWorks partner Jeffrey Katzenberg has nourished since his painful departure from Disney".

In a review for Salon, film critic Stephanie Zacharek observed that Fiona "has two little frecklelike beauty spots, one on her cheek and one on her upper chest", which she interpreted as "symbols of her human authenticity, but they also serve as a sort of factory trademark left by her creators: 'You see, we've thought of every last detail.'" Rick Groen of The Globe and Mail observed that Fiona "appears to replicate the body of Cameron Diaz", describing her as "a cute brunette with a retroussé nose, ample curves, and cleavage that broadens whenever she bends low in her scoop-neck frock." Fiona is skilled in hand-to-hand combat and martial arts. The New York Times journalist A. J. Jacobs wrote that Fiona's kung fu skills rival those of actor Bruce Lee, abilities she is explained to have inherited from her mother Queen Lillian. Describing Fiona as tough and clever, museum curator Sarah Tutton observed that, despite being a love interest, the character "doesn't play the typical supporting role ... Just because Princess Fiona subverts the idea of beauty, it doesn't mean that beauty is not important. It means that the film isn't taking it as a cliche." In the third film, Fiona teaches the classic princesses, who are naturally inclined "to assume passive positions", not to wait for their princes to rescue them, making them over into action heroines themselves when Prince Charming takes over the kingdom while teaching them to stand up for themselves. Several critics considered this moment to be about girl power and female empowerment, as well as a Charlie's Angels reference. Diaz believes that the films and her character "retain the best qualities of" classic fairy tale characters, "infusing them with contemporary wit, style and relevance" for a more contemporary generation. Diaz elaborated, "We do love those girls ... But now they have a whole new life. They can exist in our current culture, our pop culture again ... Where before, they were forgotten. It's a celebration of them. It's a rebirth." Furthermore, Diaz believes that the princesses' independence is a positive message for both women and men, interpreting it as "a message for everyone … You have to be proactive in your own life." Miller believes that Fiona's skills as a martial artist prove naturally beneficial to her adjustment to motherhood because "she can use her whole body. She's very adaptable."

== Appearances ==
=== Film series ===
Fiona as a human

Fiona first appears in Shrek (2001) as a bride chosen by Lord Farquaad, who intends to marry the princess solely so that he can become King of Duloc. In order to regain ownership of his swamp, Shrek and Donkey agree to retrieve Fiona from her dragon-guarded tower and deliver her to Farquaad. Fiona is rescued successfully but disappointed upon discovering that Shrek is an ogre instead of a knight, proceeding to act coldly towards him at the beginning of their journey back to Duloc. However, her attitude softens once she overhears Shrek explain that he is constantly misjudged by his appearance, and the two gradually develop a camaraderie as Fiona falls in love with Shrek. Late one evening, Donkey discovers that Fiona is under an enchantment that transforms her into an ogre every night, and she wishes to break the spell by kissing Farquaad before the next sunset. When she finally decides to tell Shrek the truth the following morning, she transforms back into human and learns that Shrek has already summoned Farquaad to take her back to Duloc himself, having overheard and misinterpreted some of her conversation with Donkey. The princess and ogre part ways, Fiona returning to Duloc with Farquaad and Shrek returning to his swamp alone. Shrek and Donkey soon interrupt Fiona and Farquaad's wedding ceremony, where Shrek professes his love for her. With the sun setting, Fiona allows herself to transform into an ogre in front of Shrek for the first time, prompting Farquaad to threaten to lock her back in her tower for eternity. However, the dragon that had once imprisoned Fiona, eats Farquaad, killing him. Fiona finally confesses her feelings for Shrek and, upon kissing him, turns into an ogre full-time; the two ogres marry.

In Shrek 2 (2004), Fiona and Shrek return home from their honeymoon to find that Fiona's parents are inviting them to the kingdom of Far, Far Away to celebrate and bless their marriage. Shrek is apprehensive about meeting his parents-in-law, but Fiona insists. Fiona's parents, King Harold and Queen Lillian, are surprised to find that their daughter married an ogre, with Harold acting particularly coldly towards his new son-in-law, which in turn strains Fiona and Shrek's relationship. When a tearful Fiona unintentionally summons her Fairy Godmother, who discovers that the princess married someone other than Prince Charming – her own son – she conspires with Harold to kill Shrek and trick Fiona into falling in love with Charming, as per their original agreement. Fiona is briefly returned to her human form when Shrek consumes a potion that turns both him and his true love beautiful, but Shrek must obtain a kiss from Fiona before midnight, otherwise the spell will revert. However, Fairy Godmother, from whom Shrek steals the potion, tricks Fiona into believing Charming is Shrek's human form. Despite their efforts, Fiona continues to resent Charming's impression of her husband to the point where Fairy Godmother imprisons Shrek and insists that Harold feed Fiona a potion that will force her to fall in love with whomever she kisses first, intending for this to be Charming. However, the king refuses upon seeing how unhappy Fiona has become, thwarting Fairy Godmother's plan. Fairy Godmother and Charming are defeated by Fiona, Shrek and their friends. Although Shrek offers to kiss Fiona so that they can remain human forever, Fiona refuses, insisting that she would rather spend forever with the ogre she fell in love with and married, and they turn back into ogres.

In Shrek the Third (2007), Fiona and Shrek take on the roles of acting Queen and King of Far Far Away while Harold is ill. When Harold passes away, Shrek is reluctantly named next-in-line to Harold's throne, a position he declines because becoming king would prevent him and Fiona from returning to their swamp. Determined to locate a suitable heir, Shrek sets out to recruit Fiona's cousin Arthur Pendragon to convince him to assume the throne. Before Shrek departs, Fiona finally reveals that she is pregnant, forcing Shrek to come to terms with the idea of fatherhood. While Shrek, Donkey and Puss venture to Camelot to recruit Arthur, Fiona remains at Far, Far Away, where her princess friends Rapunzel, Snow White, Sleeping Beauty, Cinderella and her stepsister Doris host a baby shower for her. The shower is interrupted by Prince Charming, still bitter over losing both the kingdom and Fiona to Shrek. Charming stages an invasion so that he can proclaim himself king of Far Far Away. Instead of waiting to be rescued, an idea that Fiona finds appalling, she encourages the princesses to free themselves and fight back. After escaping the dungeon, Fiona, Lillian and the princesses (albeit Rapunzel, who has betrayed them to marry Charming) organize a resistance to defend themselves and the kingdom. Artie makes a speech to convince the villains to go straight. In the end, Fiona and Shrek return to the swamp, where Fiona gives birth to ogre triplets named Felicia, Fergus and Farkle.

Shrek Forever After (2010) reveals that, during the events of the first film, Fiona's parents had nearly lost the kingdom to Rumpelstiltskin, nearly signing it over in return for their daughter's freedom, but his plans are thwarted when Fiona is rescued by and falls in love with Shrek. Fiona confronts Shrek, who has grown frustrated with his mundane repetitive life since becoming a father, about losing his temper during their children's birthday; a heated argument between the two prompts Shrek to wish he had never rescued Fiona from the tower, a comment by which Fiona is hurt. When Shrek makes his deal with Rumpelstiltskin, for a single day he is taken to an alternate reality where he was never born. Here, Rumpelstiltskin has seized power by tricking Fiona's parents out of ruling the kingdom of Far Far Away. Since Shrek never frees Fiona from the tower, she escapes on her own and is still under the witch's spell – human by day and ogre by night – and has subsequently become the leader of a group of Ogre resistance fighters. Shrek initially believes his relationship with Fiona still exists there but when she doesn't even recognize him, he finally accepts completely that the reality he is in is not his own and that Rumpelstiltskin has truly altered reality to be as if he never existed until now. Fiona is shown to still be kindhearted and caring but bitterly cynical and disillusioned about the power of true love, because she was never rescued from her tower, having grown traumatized from her years of solitary imprisonment. She begins to fall in love with him again when he starts training with her, but still does not kiss him (having only started to find him likable). But Fiona's attitude towards Shrek changes as she and the other ogres head off to take down Rumpelstiltskin once and for all. During the day, Shrek realizes that a loophole will negate the deal if he can receive a True Love's kiss from Fiona. After a failed attempt, they realize that he has succeeded when Fiona's curse has been broken. The timeline returns to normal, and Shrek returns to his children's birthday party before he lashed out at everybody and warmly greets Fiona.

=== Television specials and shorts ===
Fiona has appeared in two holiday-themed television specials: Shrek the Halls (2007) and Scared Shrekless (2010). The animated short Shrek in the Swamp Karaoke Dance Party! (2001) is included on home video releases of Shrek, featuring several of the film's characters performing covers of well-known songs. In the short, Fiona sings an excerpt from Madonna's song "Like a Virgin" (1984). Fiona appears in the short Shrek 4-D, a 4-D film originally shown at various amusement and theme parks. The short was renamed Shrek 3-D and The Ghost of Lord Farquaad for home video and streaming service releases. In it, Fiona and Shrek's honeymooning plans are interrupted by Farquaad's ghost, who abducts Fiona and intends to kill the princess so that he can remarry her ghost in the afterlife. Shrek and Donkey pursue Farquaad determined to rescue her, assisted by Dragon. Fiona appears in the short film Far, Far Away Idol, a parody of the reality television singing competition American Idol, which is included as a bonus feature on home video releases of Shrek 2. First serving as a judge alongside Shrek and an animated version of American Idol judge Simon Cowell, offering feedback about the other characters performances, Fiona eventually duets The Romantics' "What I Like About You" with Shrek.

=== Stage ===
Fiona appeared in the stage musical adaptation of the film, which ran on Broadway from 2008 to 2010. The role was originated by actress Sutton Foster, who had been involved in the project three years before its premiere, having learned about it from composer Jeanine Tesori and director Jason Moore. She was drawn towards the idea of playing a princess for the first time, the prospect of which she found "fun", as well as the opportunity to collaborate with lyricist and librettist David Lindsay-Abaire. Actresses Keaton Whittaker and Marissa O'Donnell portrayed younger versions of the character. Before production, Foster described Fiona as an atypical princess who is "a little bipolar, but rightfully so" having "grown up, like we all have, with ideas of how the world works" while trying to surround herself with, and emulate fairy tales. Foster believes Fiona constantly struggles with her "inner ogre" despite trying to be perfect. "Everything she's been told is that she's supposed to look a certain way and act a certain way, but everything on the inside is telling her something different." Although Fiona longs to be a "proper princess", Foster identifies herself as "more of a tomboy", while Fiona's body contradicts her desires: "as soon as she starts farting and burping, she has a really great time! And I just love that, that she finds herself in just having fun with an ogre, with Shrek. And I love that she falls in love with him through something crude." Foster found it "fun to play a truly conflicted character and to be a princess who burps and farts and gets to do silly things." Foster earned a Tony Award nomination for Best Actress in a Musical. Despite being a fan of the musical adaption, Diaz has stated that she has no intention of reprising her role on stage. In the musical's original West End cast, Fiona was portrayed by Amanda Holden. Other actresses who have played Fiona in various productions around the world include Kimberley Walsh, Carley Stenson, Faye Brookes, Lucy Durack, Amelia Lily, Laura Main, Joanne Clifton, and Julia Murney. (Note: Attributed to multiple references:)

== Reception ==
=== Critical response ===
During early press screenings, critics were amused by Fiona's bluebird scene, to the point where they laughed hysterically. David Ansen of Newsweek reported that the sequence consistently "sends audiences into fits of delight". Time film critic Richard Schickel called Fiona "an excellent character", highlighting her confrontation with Monsieur Hood. Kelly Vance of the East Bay Express said "Fiona is more charming, more vulnerable, perkier, and even more sensitive than if she were played by a human actress". Film critic Emanuel Levy believes Shrek benefits from Fiona and Diaz's performance. Malcolm Johnson of the Hartford Courant lauded Fiona as "a marvel, as beautiful and shapely as a real star but capable of moves that go beyond the wirework in The Matrix". Johnson continued, "Every turn of Fiona's head, every glance, every shift of mouth lift character animation to new heights". Similarly, the London Evening Standard wrote that "every bright ringlet on Princess Fiona ... the liquefaction flow of her velvet robe, even her skin tones have the feel of organic root, thread or cell". Slant Magazine's Ed Gonzalez identified Fiona's struggles with self-loathing as the film's strongest asset. Reviewing Shrek the Third, Entertainment Weekly film critic Lisa Schwarzbaum described Fiona as "fabulously resourceful", identifying the moment she reinvents her princess friends into independent women as the film's sole "Cool Thing".

Diaz has also received positive attention for her voice acting. The Washington Post film critic Desson Howe wrote that Diaz's performance offers "a funny, earthy princess". GamesRadar+ wrote Fiona "nestle[s] comfortably between the movie's storybook style and photo-realistic convincingness," continuing that Diaz's performance "reinforces her game-for-a-laugh reputation". Kim Morgan of OregonLive.com said, "Diaz's sweet yet tough demeanor shines through all her computer-generated-imagery beauty," citing her vulnerability as an asset. The Daily Telegraph's film critic Andrew O'Hagan believes Diaz imbues Fiona with "easygoing shrillness that modern eight-year-olds may find likeable", while the Deseret News' Jeff Vice wrote that Diaz proves more than merely "a pretty face". Bruce Westbrook of the Houston Chronicle reviewed Diaz as an improvement upon "the spunkiness of today's heroines" by "packing surprise punches that would have suited her role in Charlie's Angels". Turner Classic Movies and TV Guide agreed that Diaz's performance earned the actress several younger fans. PopMatters' Cynthia Fuchs, reviewing the fourth film, described the princess as "always at least a little wonderful, patient, and smart (and now awesomely Amazonian)," and found herself wishing Fiona would discover a parallel universe in which she is truly appreciated.

Not all reviews were positive. Finding Fiona's fight scene unnecessary, Derek Armstrong of AllMovie wrote that it "leaves things feeling scattershot" despite its appealing visuals. In a negative review, CNN's Paul Tatara dismissed Fiona as "bland" and the film's "only miscue among the characters". Criticizing her design, Tatara felt the princess "gives off the creepy air of a possessed Barbie Doll" while "Diaz's California-girl line readings simply don't fit the character." Similarly, the Chicago Tribune's Mark Caro found Fiona's design generic and Barbie-like, but admitted these characteristics benefit the film's plot and themes. Anthony Quinn of The Independent found Fiona's realism particularly troubling, suggesting that the animators should have simply "invite[d] Cameron Diaz to play her as well as voice her." Similarly, The New Yorker film critic Anthony Lane felt the character was too realistic, writing, "What I don't want is to gaze at Princess Fiona ... and wonder if she is supposed to resemble Cameron Diaz". Peter Bradshaw, film critic for The Guardian, dismissed Fiona and the film's human characters as "disappointingly ordinary looking and unexpressive," comparing them to claymation, while New York's Peter Rainer agreed that human characters such as Fiona "are less interesting". Paul Malcolm of LA Weekly described Diaz's performance as "insuperably flat". Philippa Hawker of The Age felt the third film could benefited from Fiona being named Harold's heir, opposing the idea of relegating her to "a cursory girl-power scenario".

=== Feminist analysis ===
Some media publications have regarded Fiona as a feminist icon. Upon her debut, Fiona was celebrated by most critics "as a radical new take on the princess myth". Fiona's subversion of common princess tropes continues to be widely discussed in the media. Wired contributor Claudia Puig felt the first film boasts "a wonderfully affirming message for girls courtesy of Fiona". Jack Rear, writing for Pretty 52, described Fiona as "feminism goals" due to her martial arts proficiency. Affinity Magazine contributor Isabel Tovar identified the moment Fiona defeats Monsieur Hood as "female empowering", believing "Fiona has been feminist queen since day one." Reviewing Shrek Forever After, Rachel Giese of CBC found the character's "girl-power turn as a warrior princess" to be one of the installment's most endearing changes. Crowning the character "the best feminist action hero around", Emily Shire of The Week deemed Fiona "the kind of feminist action hero movies need more of", describing her as a strong heroine who "saves herself and loved ones" while accepting the "'ugly' and 'gross' aspects of herself". Shire also voiced her preference for Fiona over The Hunger Games' Katniss Everdeen and the superheroine Wonder Woman. Allison Maloney of The Shriver Report shared Shire's sentiments. Felicity Sleeman, a writer for Farrago, believes "Fiona completely dispels any misconceptions of the passive princess trope", citing her as a strong female character "able to stand up for herself and fight in ways that would typically be considered masculine." Sleeman continued that one of the most important components of Fiona's personality "is that the films don't ignore or degrade any of her qualities that are considered typically feminine", elaborating that her struggles over her appearance are "significant in that it presents the ways in which so many girls are pressured by society to uphold a certain standard of beauty." Sleeman concluded, "In an industry where female characters have so often portrayed as secondary characters defined by their beauty ... Fiona is a well-rounded character who represents an eclectic mix of traits that are representative of real women", remaining feminine yet strong. Rachel O'Neill, a writer for The Daily Edge, identified Fiona as "the first badass princess ... able to speak for herself", joking, "nobody can fling a mermaid quite like Fiona."

In 2008, BBC News named Fiona "the next feminist icon", believing the character retains "a certain sex appeal which continues even after she changes into an ogre - perfectly underlining how attitudes have changed towards women in the 21st Century." HuffPost contributor Hayley Krischer cited Fiona as a rare example of a princess who "br[oke] the mold". Iona Tytler of Babe.net recognized Fiona among childhood feminist characters "who got you where you are today". Praising her independence, Tytler said Fiona "overc[ame] the societal prejudice in her world that came with being an ogre" while becoming "more comfortable in her own skin." Sarah Tutton, curator of the Australian Centre for the Moving Image's DreamWorks exhibit, credits Fiona with "br[eaking] the mould of the helpless princess," citing her as a modern-day feminist. Tutton also said the character "completely subverts what it means to be a beautiful princess." Forbes contributor Dani Di Placido believes Fiona embodied characteristics associated with the unconventional, rebellious warrior princess several years before such traits became standard in film and television. Similarly, the British Film Institute's So Mayer wrote that heroines such as Merida and Elsa from Disney's Brave (2012) and Frozen (2013), respectively, were both "late to the party compared to" Fiona, reflecting, "over the course of the trilogy she wanders the wilderness, turns down Lord Farquaad, survives imprisonment, decides she prefers being ogre to being human, and organizes a resistance composed of fairytale princesses." Furthermore, Female Action Heroes: A Guide to Women in Comics, Video Games, Film, and Television author Gladys L. Knight wrote that Fiona challenged the manner in which medieval women are portrayed on screen. Mary Zeiss Stange, author of Encyclopedia of Women in Today's World, Volume 1, cited Fiona as an example of an "outstanding female action hero".Refinery 29's Anne Cohen felt Fiona remains a strong heroine despite Shrek's "un-feminist plot" featuring several men making decisions about her future without her involvement. Cohen praised Fiona for defending herself, defying stereotypes, speaking her mind and accepting her own flaws. Crowning Fiona an "important cultural milestone", the author concluded that she is "fierce, honest [and] wonderful" despite her unconventional appearance.

Some critics felt Fiona's fighting prowess was otherwise undermined by her insecurities and motivations. Despite being impressed with the character's fighting ability, Furniss believes this contradicts with "her need to seek authentication from a male romantic partner", arguing that a true martial artist would few have concerns about outward appearance. Although acknowledging that the film demonstrates themes of inner beauty among "women of all types", the author argued that Fiona's understanding relies on male approval, referring to her relationships with both Farquaad and Shrek, and further observing that she struggles to use this same martial arts prowess to fend off Farquaad's guards. Furniss found it disappointing that her arc is "activated by the kiss of a man", but admitted the completion of Shrek's character development is similarly determined by him kissing Fiona. Furniss doubts Fiona would not have been able to accept her ogre form had Shrek decided to retreat to his swamp alone after kissing her. Author Margot Mifflin, writing for Salon, felt that some of Fiona's actions contradict with the film's morals about looks being less important, citing that she dislikes Farquaad more for his short stature than his cruelty towards others. She also found the princess in Steig's original story to be more liberated and less of a damsel in distress than Fiona. Despite describing the character's ogre form as "an overfed Cabbage Patch doll with the drowning eyes and apologetic expression of a Hummel figurine", Mifflin found the fact that Fiona remains an ogre, fights, talks back and has more realistic body proportions to be ground-breaking, while describing her musical solo as one of the film's "hilarious" highlights. The Conversation's Michelle Smith was unimpressed, writing that despite the character's fighting skills, Fiona remains "desperate to follow the fairy tale script" and believes marrying her rescuer is "her ultimate reward".

=== Recognition ===
Fiona was celebrated as a positive role model by the Girl Scouts of the USA, who used the character's likeness in several tie-in media to promote the organization's "Issues for Girl Scouts" movement and encourage "girls to develop self-confidence and embrace diversity." The organization also hosted a free screening of the film in 2001, which was attended by an audience of 340. For her performance in Shrek, Diaz won a Kid's Choice Award for Best Burp, which the actress claims to be one of her greatest achievements. According to Daniel Kurland of Screen Rant, Diaz "remains a crucial component of what makes the movie work" despite resembling an "unsung hero" throughout the franchise. Summarizing the actress' career, Kendall Fisher of E! Online said Diaz "voiced one of our favorite animated characters". The Ringer ranked Shrek Diaz's best film, believing her performance as Fiona aged better than the film's soundtrack and animation. Author Alison Herman elaborated that Fiona embraced her flaws and offered children "an important lesson in both self-esteem and the comedic value of fart jokes", while the actress "holds her own against" Myers and Murphy; "as a character, Fiona subverts the pretty-princess trope enough to provide fuel for undergrad media studies papers for decades to come".

Marie Claire ranked Fiona Diaz's third best "Movie Moments That Made Us Fall In Love With Her". In addition to ranking Fiona the fourth best role of Diaz's career following her retirement in 2018, Samarth Goyal of the Hindustan Times crowned Fiona "one of the most loved animated characters of the 21st century", crediting her with making Diaz "a big star". In 2011, Gulf News ranked Diaz among "Hollywood's A-list of most popular voice actors", with Forbes reporting in 2010 that the actress was mentioned in the media approximately 1,809 times while promoting the most recent Shrek film. Teen Vogue considered Fiona among the "17 Best Princesses in Movies and TV", praising the character for learning "to love herself." NBC New York's Bryan Alexander described Fiona as "the world's hottest ogre", while Stephen Hunter, film critic for The Washington Post, found hearing Diaz's voice from a computer-animated character "kind of hot". To promote Shrek 2, ice cream restaurant Baskin-Robbins named a flavor after the character, entitled Fiona's Fairytale. Described as "pink and purple swirled", the ice cream was cotton candy-flavored.
