= International Association of Multilingualism =

The International Association of Multilingualism (IAM) is an academic, scientific professional association whose members undertake research in all areas of linguistics dealing with all facets of multilingualism. Research has focused on tri- and quadruple language acquisition by children, as well as on societal instances of multilingualism or on cases of individual multilingual repertoires, for example. IAM members work in various linguistic fields, including psycholinguistics, sociolinguistics, educational linguistics, language acquisition and applied linguistics.

== History ==
The IAM was founded in 2003 by Jasone Cenoz, Britta Hufeisen, and Ulrike Jessner during the conference at the Institute of Technology in Tralee, Ireland.

== Presidents ==
- 2005-2009 Britta Hufeisen
- 2009–2014 Ulrike Jessner
- 2014-2016 Jasone Cenoz

Current board members are from universities in Germany, Israel, Ireland, Poland, Spain, Switzerland, UK and the US.

== Activities ==
The members organize biannual conferences:

- 1999 1st conference at the University of Innsbruck, Austria
- 2001 2nd conference at the Institute of Technology in Tralee, Ireland
- 2003 3rd conference at the Stenden Hogeschool Leeuwarden, Netherland
- 2005 4th conference at the University of Fribourg, Switzerland
- 2007 5th conference at the University of Stirling, UK
- 2009 6th conference at the Free University of Bolzano, Italy
- 2011 7th conference at Warsaw University, Poland
- 2012 8th conference in UniversityJaume I, Castelló de la Plana, Spain
- 2014 9th conference in Uppsala, Sweden.

Although the dominant language of conference is English, all languages are welcome and papers are often held in other languages besides English, such as French, German or Spanish.

In 2010 a biannual Round Table Discussion on specific topics was founded by founding member Jean-Marc Dewaele at Birkbeck College in the United Kingdom, which was followed by a Round Table Discussion in 2012 in the United States at the MIT, organized by Suzanne Flynn, and 2013 at the University of Silesia in Poland, organized by Danuta Gabrys-Barker. The IAM held a Research Network meeting at the AILA conferences in Essen, Germany in 2008 and is a member of the Professional Network Forum with the European Center for Modern Languages in Graz. Since 2004 the IAM has had a publication venue, the International Journal of Multilingualism, originally edited by Jasone Cenoz, Spain, and Ulrike Jessner, Austria. The current editors are Danuta Gabrys-Barker, Poland, and Eva Vetter, Austria. After several years of two issues annually, it is now published four times annually. The language of publication is English. A newsletter is also distributed to association members approximately twice annually. A book series on multilingualism and multiple language learning and acquisition is linked to the IAM via the editorial board, which is identical to the board of the IAM. This series is edited by Britta Hufeisen and Beate Lindemann. All languages of publication are welcome.

== Secondary sources ==
- Cali, Chantal/Vetter, Eva (2008), Le profil plurilingue des apprenants et ses effets sur la production d’un écrit fonctionnel complexe en français langue étrangère. In: Gibson, Martha / Hufeisen, Britta / Personne, Cornelia (eds.) : Mehrsprachigkeit : lernen und lehren Multilingualism : Learning and Insgtruction Le Plurilinguisme : apprendre et enseigner O Plurilinguismo : aprender e ensinar. Selected papers from the L3 conference in Freiburg/Switzerland 2005, 121-134.
- Cenoz, J., & Jessner, U. (Eds.). (2000). English in Europe: The acquisition of a third language. Clevedon: Multilingual Matters
- Cenoz, J., Hufeisen, B., & Jessner, U. (Eds.). (2001). Crosslinguistic Influence in Third Language Acquisition. Clevedon: Multilingual Matters.
- Cenoz, J., Hufeisen, B., & Jessner, U. (Eds.). (2001). Looking Beyond Second Language Acquisition: Studies in Third language Acquisition and Trilingualism. Tübingen: Stauffenburg.
- Cenoz, J., Hufeisen, B., & Jessner, U. (Eds.). (2003). The Multilingual Lexicon. Dordrecht: Kluwer.
- De Angelis, Gessica (2007) Third or Additional Language Acquisition. Bristol: Multilingual Matters.
- Dewaele, Jean-Marc (2013). Emotions in multiple languages. Basingstoke (UK), Palgrave Macmillan (2nd revised edition in paperback).
- Flynn, Susanne/Foley, C./Vinnitskaya, I. (2004), The Cumulative-Enhancement Model for Language Acquisition: Comparing Adults' and Children's Patterns of Development in First, Second and Third Language Acquisition of Relative Clauses. International Journal of Multilingualism 1:1, 3-17.
- Gabryś-Barker, D.(2005). Aspects of Multilingual Storage, Processing and Retrieval. Katowice: University of Silesia Press.
- Gabryś-Barker, D. (Ed.).(2012). Cross-linguistic Influences in Multilingual Language Acquisition. Berlin/Heidelberg: Springer.
- Herdina, P., & Jessner, U. (2002). A dynamic model of multilingualism: Perspectives of change in psycholinguistics. Clevedon: Multilingual Matters.
- Jessner, U. (2006). Linguistic awareness in multilinguals: English as a third language. Edinburgh, UK: Edinburgh University Press.
- Kramsch, C. (2010). The multilingual subject. Oxford, UK: Oxford University Press.
- Müller-Lancé, Johannes (2002), La corrélation entre la ressemblance morphologique des mots et la probabilité du transfert interlinguistique". In: Kischel, Gerhard (ed.), EuroCom - Mehrsprachiges Europa durch Interkomprehension in Sprachfamilien. Tagungsband des Internationalen Fachkongresses, Hagen, 9.-10. November 2001. Hagen: FernUniversität/Gesamthochschule (erscheint auch noch unter Aachen: Shaker), 141-159.
- Safont Jorda, M. Pilar (2013), Pragmatic Competence in Multilingual Contexts. New York, Wiley & Sons.
