= Paul Nation =

New Zealand applied linguist

- Born: 28 April 1944 (age 82)

Academic work
- Institutions: Victoria University of Wellington

Paul Nation (complete name Ian Stephen Paul Nation, born 28 April 1944) is a scholar in the field of linguistics and teaching methodology. As a professor in the field of applied linguistics with a specialization in pedagogical methodology, he created a language teaching framework to identify key areas of language teaching focus. Paul Nation is best known for this framework, which has been labelled The Four Strands. He has also made contributions through his research in the field of language acquisition that focuses on the benefits of extensive reading and repetition as well as intensive reading.

== Biography ==
Paul Nation is a member of the School of Linguistics and Applied Language Studies department at Victoria University of Wellington, New Zealand. He is well known for his research into the methodology of language teaching and vocabulary learning. Nation is employed at Victoria University of Wellington where he currently holds the position of an Emeritus Professor. Previously in his career, Nation instructed courses on "pedagogical grammar, curriculum design, and teaching and learning vocabulary". He has experience with teaching and developing teaching pedagogy around the world in places such as Indonesia, Thailand, the United States, Finland, and Japan.

Nation has been featured on the BBC News along with John Read in an article titled How many words do you need to speak a language?. In addition, Paul has presented his research in numerous self-written works, interviews, and lectures.

== Research ==
Key concepts of his works are word frequency lists as guidelines to vocabulary acquisition, the learning burden of a word, the need to teach learning strategies to students in order to increase their autonomy in vocabulary expansion for low-frequency items, support to extensive reading of accessible texts (≥95-98% of known words), the usefulness of L2→L1 tools (dictionaries, word cards) for their clarity. After the communicative approach of the 80's, his works have been instrumental for second language courses design and current teaching methods, relying mainly on fast vocabulary acquisition of frequent words. Together with Batia Laufer, James Coady, Norbert Schmitt, Paul Meara, Rebecca Oxford, and Michael Swan, his position is linked to Stephen Krashen's Natural approach (emphasis on frequent grammatical and lexical items first) and to the proposed Lexical approach (emphasis on vocabulary) of language teaching.

=== The Four Strands ===
Paul Nation is well known for developing the Four Strands language teaching framework. Paul Nation created the four strands with the intention of establishing a set of guidelines to help language teachers in curating a balanced language learning course curriculum. In this framework, it is recommended that twenty-five percent of class time is spent working on language development from each individual strand. The aim of the four strands is to facilitate the creation of a flexible and well balanced language teaching curriculum.

The four equally important principles of language teaching identified by Paul Nation are as follows :

==== 1. Meaning-focused input ====
This strand of meaning-focused input supports the development of receptive language skills in second language learners. Reading and listening is heavily focused on in this strand as these activities work to increase receptive language abilities. With this strand Nation draws on Steven Krashen's second language acquisition research which emphasizes the importance of input on second language development. Contrastingly to Krashen's views on comprehension based-instruction, Nation insists that only a quarter of class time should be dedicated to meaning-focused input. During this time, students should be encouraged to engage with the input being presented to them in order to create a deeper understanding of the language material. Activities that utilize meaning-focused input included reading graded readers or listening to podcasts and recordings.

==== 2. Meaning-focused output ====
This strand of meaning-focused output supports the development of productive skills in second language learners. Language learning activities that support the meaning-focused output strand involve the development of writing and speaking skills where language is being produced by the learner in the learner's second language. Activities that utilize meaning-focused output include free writing in a journal, or telling a story using oral communication. Paul Nation emphasizes the importance of exposing language learners to language output on the grounds that having the opportunity to experiment with the production of a word or phrase strengthens the learner's comprehension of vocabulary. Additionally, the meaning-focused output strand provides language learners with the opportunity to develop discourse skills such as turn-taking and the negotiation of meaning. As with each of the four strands, meaning-focused output should account for one quarter of a course curriculum

==== 3. Language-focused learning ====
Unlike meaning-focused input and meaning-focused output, language-focused learning requires language learners to pay close attention to the features of the language they are learning. Students engage in the explicit learning of "pronunciation, spelling, vocabulary, grammar, and discourse". Activities that utilize language-focused learning include dictionary searches, memorizing vocabulary, and mimicking correct word pronunciation. Nation suggests that language features being studied in a second language course should occur repeatedly over an extensive length of time in order for learners to effectively retain the information. This strand should be employed in a language learning classroom for one quarter of the time spent in class.

==== 4. Fluency development ====
The fluency development strand focuses on the practice and mastery of pre-existing language skills in order to develop fluency in the learner's language reception and production skills. This strand encompasses the three strands that come before it as students work to master the listening, speaking, reading, and writing skills that they have acquired previously in their second language acquisition course. No new language items are introduced to learners in this strand, only familiar language items are exposed to the learner. Activities that utilize the fluency development strand include speed reading, repetitive writing and speaking exercises, and watching familiar movies. This strand, along with meaning-focused input, meaning-focused output, and language-focused learning should take up no more than one quarter of the allotted class time.

=== Vocabulary Acquisition ===
Classroom management is one area of teaching that is not always considered, but can be of great benefit to students when planned effectively. It involves the language used by the teacher when describing activities, controlling student behaviour, and directing students in what they should be doing. According to Nation (2003), it is important that classroom management occurs in the target language, in order for learners to have more consistent exposure to the language. The teacher's role then is to observe and make note of the vocabulary and structures commonly used during classroom management, and compile a list of the most frequently used words or phrases. This list can then be used to form meaningful input for the learners, thereby increasing their exposure and use of the second language.

The first language can have a role in learning a second language when used thoughtfully. If a class consists of learners who share the same first language, some class discussions can be held in that language. Learners are more likely to be engaged in the conversation, and can contribute more than they could in the second language. Often vocabulary from the second language is used during these discussions, resulting in learners retaining more vocabulary in general.

The English language contains many words that have been borrowed or are derived from other languages. Getting students to notice these borrowed words is helpful when acquiring vocabulary in English, because they may be able to make connections between their first language and their second language. Nation (2003) describes the concept of noticing borrowed words as a useful strategy for expanding learners vocabulary.

According to Nation, although explicit vocabulary instruction is necessary for a balanced curriculum, it is not favourable for expanding learners' vocabulary knowledge. Teachers should consider every aspect of a word when teaching new vocabulary, to determine which aspect needs the most focus. Nation characterizes this consideration as a "learning burden".

In terms of language testing, Nation has developed the Vocabulary Levels Test. This test aids teachers in deciding which vocabulary groups require the most attention. It provides an alternate view towards vocabulary within any language, consisting of classifications based on word frequency. It is important to be aware of the distinction between low- and high-frequency words, as both these categories require a different course of action. Nation outlines a criterion which can be used to make the distinction between low- and high-frequency words. This involves examining "frequency of occurrence, coverage of the text, size of the high-frequency group, overlap between various word counts, and the starting point of specialized vocabularies". Nation also describes this test as being one of cost-benefit. Rather than spending time explicitly teaching low-frequency words, teachers should provide various strategies for dealing with these words, such as guessing based on the context surrounding the word, memorization techniques, and learning certain parts of each word.

=== Extensive Reading ===
A notable area of methodological contribution from Paul Nation is his research and theory surrounding extensive reading and vocabulary acquisition. Through his 1997 literature review, Nation has determined that in order for extensive reading to be valuable, the proper level of book must be selected for the learner. This creates opportunities for the learner to read many books at their level. He mentions that a book which is deemed the "right fit" for a learner, requires the majority of vocabulary to be already familiar to the reader with a maximum of two unfamiliar words for every 100 words read. Nation suggests that in order for the new vocabulary to remain present and understood in the learners mind, the quality of the meetings with new words must be memorable. Nation then outlines 4 levels of quality meetings with words.

==== 1. Noticing ====
This is the first level of creating quality meetings. Noticing involves both incidental and deliberate attention. Learners may hypothesize the meaning of new words by attempting to understand the context surrounding the word, or they may search for definitions of new words in a dictionary. Noticing a new word creates a link of meaning which can then lead to the second level, retrieval.

==== 2. Retrieval ====
Retrieval of a new word allows a learner to draw upon the word that they had previously noticed and then retrieve what they remember about the word such as the context they encountered it in, the meaning, etc. Essentially, retrieval involves taking previously learned words, and applying them for further understanding. One method for getting learners to practice retrieving words is by repeatedly reading a text where the new word appears often.

==== 3. Varied Meetings ====
The more a new word is encountered, the more familiar the meaning becomes to a learner. This is because meeting a word in various contexts allows one to draw upon previous knowledge of the word/meaning and carry it across contexts. This occurs most often when encountering new words in extensive reading. The key here is that the new words should appear in varying contexts so the learner gains an understanding of the different ways the word is used.

==== 4. Elaboration ====
Finally, the last level is elaboration. This level suggests the use of graded reading promotion as a simple yet effective way to facilitate extensive reading. This promotion allows readers to then continue reading books a level above where they were reading in order to continue acquiring new vocabulary and encounter previously learned vocabulary in new contexts.

=== Written works ===
Since 1989, Nation has made several contributions to the Applied Linguistics and teaching methodology communities. These contributions cover topics such as language learning fluency, oral classroom activities, research surrounding receptive vocabulary capabilities and many more. In order to understand the expanse of methodological areas that Nation has been able to address, they will be demonstrated below by their general topics.

==== Vocabulary ====
- Identifying Technical Vocabulary
- Measuring the Vocabulary Size of Native Speakers of English in New Zealand Secondary Schools
- Word Meaning in Academic English: Homography in the Academic Word List
- Teaching Communicative and Interactive Vocabulary for EFL learners
- Teaching and Testing Vocabulary
- Vocabulary Size Research at Victoria University of Wellington
- Beyond Single Words: The Most Frequent Collocations in Spoken English

==== Reading ====
- Reading Speed Improvement In a Speed Reading Course and its Effect on Language Memory Span

==== Methodology ====
- Learning to Teach Spanish: Identifying, Inducting, and Supporting Apprentice Teachers in the Ann Arbor Languages Partnership
- Applying the Four Strands to Language Learning.

==== Speaking ====
- A Vocabulary-Size Test of Controlled Productive Ability Language Testing .
- Vocabulary Size and Use: Lexical Richness in L2 Written Production
- Improving Speaking Fluency
- Speaking Activities: Five Features

==== General Research ====
- Word Families
- How Large Can a Receptive Vocabulary Be?
- Introduction: Meara's Contribution to Research in L2 Lexical Processing

With his most notable and numerous literary and methodological contributions falling under the umbrella of vocabulary, it is to no surprise that vocabulary size and methodology is his specialization. It is on this area of acquisition that he typically lectures both classes and the linguistics community on.

== Sources ==
- Coady, J. (1997), Coady; Huckin (eds.), Second Language Vocabulary Acquisition, Cambridge University Press.
- Horst, M. (2010), "How well does teacher talk support incidental vocabulary acquisition?" (PDF), Reading in a Foreign Language, 22 (1): 161–180, ISSN 1539-0578, archived from the original (PDF) on 2010-06-12
- Taylor, A. (2004), "Learning Vocabulary in Another Language I: I.S.P. Nation...", English for Specific Purposes (Review), 23 (1): 87–90, doi:10.1016/S0889-4906(02)00014-5

== Works by Paul Nation ==
- Nation, I.S.P.; Newton, J. (2008), Teaching ESL/EFL Listening and Speaking (1st ed.), Routledge, ISBN 978-0415989701
- Nation & Carter, 1989. Vocabulary Acquisition.
- Nation, I.S.P. (1997), "Vocabulary size, text coverage, and word lists", in Schmitt; McCarthy (eds.), Vocabulary: Description, Acquisition and Pedagogy, Cambridge: Cambridge University Press, pp. 6–19, ISBN 978-0-521-58551-4
- Nation, Paul (2000), "Learning vocabulary in lexical sets: dangers and guidelines", TESOL Journal, 9 (2): 6–10, doi:10.1002/j.1949-3533.2000.tb00239.x.
- Nation, I.S.P. (2001), Learning Vocabulary in Another Language, Cambridge: Cambridge University Press, ISBN 978-0-521-80498-1
- Nation, Paul (2006), "Vocabulary: Second Language", in Keith Brown (ed.), Encyclopedia of Language & Linguistics (2nd ed.), Oxford: Elsevier, pp. 448–454.
- Nation, Paul (2006), "Language Education - Vocabulary", in Keith Brown (ed.), Encyclopedia of Language & Linguistics (2nd ed.), Oxford: Elsevier, pp. 494–499.
