= Identity and language learning =

Relationship between identity and language

In language learning research, identity refers to the personal orientation to time, space, and society, and the manner in which it develops together with, and because of, speech development.

Language is a largely social practice, and this socialization is reliant on, and develops concurrently with one's understanding of personal relationships and position in the world, and those who understand a second language are influenced by both the language itself, and the interrelations of the language to each other. For this reason, every time language learners interact in the second language, whether in the oral or written mode, they are engaged in identity construction and negotiation. However, structural conditions and social contexts are not entirely determined. Through human agency, language learners who struggle to speak from one identity position may be able to reframe their relationship with their interlocutors and claim alternative, more powerful identities from which to speak, thereby enabling learning to take place.

== Early developments ==
The relationship between identity and language learning is of interest to scholars in the fields of second language acquisition (SLA), language education, sociolinguistics, and applied linguistics. It is best understood in the context of a shift in the field from a predominantly psycholinguistic approach to SLA to include a greater focus on sociological and cultural dimensions of language learning, or what has been called the “social turn” in SLA. Thus while much research on language learning in the 1970s and 1980s was directed toward investigating the personalities, learning styles, and motivations of individual learners, contemporary researchers of identity are centrally concerned with the diverse social, historical, and cultural contexts in which language learning takes place, and how learners negotiate and sometimes resist the diverse positions those contexts offer them. Further, identity theorists question the view that learners can be defined in binary terms as motivated or unmotivated, introverted or extroverted, without considering that such affective factors are frequently socially constructed in inequitable relations of power, changing across time and space, and possibly coexisting in contradictory ways within a single individual.

Many scholars cite educational theorist Bonny Norton’s conceptualization of identity (Norton Peirce, 1995; Norton, 1997; Norton, 2000/2013) as foundational in language learning research. Her theorization highlights how learners participate in diverse learning contexts where they position themselves and are positioned in different ways. Drawing from poststructuralist Christine Weedon's (1987) notion of subjectivity and sociologist Pierre Bourdieu's (1991) power to impose reception, Norton demonstrated how learners construct and negotiate multiple identities through language, reframing relationships so that they may claim their position as legitimate speakers.

== The race aspect ==
People often consider language and identity as some structured definitions from the dictionary that they just follow. Although there are structural definitions for the words "language" and "identity", some people have different perspectives on them. In the essays written by James Baldwin, he was able to grasp a new meaning and new perspective of reading and writing because of the way these authors portray these words. We have come to a point where language somewhat links with identity. The two terms at times can go hand in hand like black and white or like a pea in a pod.

In the essay, “If Black English Isn’t a Language, Then Tell Me, What Is?” by James Baldwin talked a lot about the way he saw language to be and the way he felt that both language and identity is linked. In his essay, he said that language is the most crucial key to identity. This statement helped to show readers that we would not be who we are without language. Also, it shows his main idea about Black English because it did not have the kind of significant personality they have today. Language, incontestably, reveals the speaker . Baldwin consistently stressed on how the way one uses language can show the person the speaker is. Which shows how important it is for a person to embrace their language for their personality to be seen positively by others. Baldwin’s stress on language and identity through his different ideas really helped to open a door in every reader's mind because it makes them think back and see how language helped to form their identity.

== Contemporary ideas ==
Since Norton's conception of identity in the 1990s, it has become a central construct in language learning research foregrounded by scholars such as David Block, Aneta Pavlenko, Kelleen Toohey, Margaret Early, Peter De Costa and Christina Higgins. A number of researchers have explored how Identity categories of race, gender, class and sexual orientation may impact the language learning process. Identity now features in most encyclopedias and handbooks of language learning and teaching, and work has extended to the broader field of applied linguistics to include identity and pragmatics, sociolinguistics, and discourse. In 2015, the theme of the American Association of Applied Linguistics (AAAL) conference held in Toronto was identity, and the journal Annual Review of Applied Linguistics in the same year focused on issues of identity, with prominent scholars discussing the construct in relation to a number of topics. These included translanguaging (Angela Creese and Adrian Blackledge), transnationalism and multilingualism (Patricia Duff), technology (Steven Thorne), and migration (Ruth Wodak).

Closely linked to identity is Norton's construct of investment which complements theories of motivation in SLA. Norton argues that a learner may be a highly motivated language learner, but may nevertheless have little investment in the language practices of a given classroom or community, which may, for example, be racist, sexist, elitist, or homophobic. Thus, while motivation can be seen as a primarily psychological construct, Investment is framed within a sociological framework and seeks to make a meaningful connection between a learner’s desire and commitment to learn a language, and their complex identity. The construct of investment has sparked considerable interest and research in the field. Darvin and Norton's (2015) model of investment in language learning locates investment at the intersection of identity, capital, and ideology. Responding to conditions of mobility and fluidity that characterize the 21st century, the model highlights how learners are able to move across online and offline spaces, performing multiple identities while negotiating different forms of capital.

An extension of interest in identity and investment concerns the imagined communities that language learners may aspire to join when they learn a new language. The term “imagined community”, originally coined by Benedict Anderson (1991), was introduced to the language learning community by Norton (2001), who argued that in many language classrooms, the targeted community may be, to some extent, a reconstruction of past communities and historically constituted relationships, but also a community of the imagination, a desired community that offers possibilities for an enhanced range of identity options in the future. These innovative ideas, inspired also by Jean Lave and Etienne Wenger (1991) and Wenger (1998), are more fully developed in Kanno and Norton (2003), and Pavlenko and Norton (2007), and have proved generative in diverse research sites. An imagined community assumes an imagined identity, and a learner’s investment in the second language can be understood within this context.

== Identity and writing ==
When it comes to writing, students often become more focused in following a rubric and that is when they lose their sense of self and identity in their writing. In college essays, students are asked to write about themselves while still following a specific rubric. Colleges still expect their students to provide proper grammar, tone, punctuation, syntax, etc., but there is no way of sensing a student's individuality through that making it counterproductive (Davilia 163). This tends to be perpetuated in writing classes where their rubrics mostly consist of what is known as “white talk”(Davila 158). While some students have grown up speaking and even writing this, there are many students who don’t. Many students don’t associate with this and are then being held to a standard they don’t understand. According to Bethany Davila “[English] then, is a standard language variety that is associated with and defined by white people and that affords unearned racial privilege all while seeming like commonsense or a social norm”(Davila 155). Students who come from differing backgrounds are put at a disadvantage and struggle to write or even connect with the material being presented to them.

This type of change begins in the classroom. Students learn best from each other, which is why classroom discourse allows students to question their own identities and beliefs. In the text, Exploring Values in a Changing Society: A Writing Assignment for Freshman English Martha K. Smith mentions how, when students utilize “their own life experiences, they seem able to find the voices to engage in critical self-analysis”(Smith 3). This is why teachers have been able to create new assignments that allow students to self-reflect on their values, religious beliefs, cultural beliefs, and more (Smith2). When students find their voices they are able to better critically analyze their own experiences (Smith 3). By doing this, students are able to exercise different parts of their writing identities and are learning different skills that will help them outside of the classroom as well.

In the text, Re-examining Constructions of Basic Writers’ Identities: Graduate Teaching, New Developments in the Contextual Model, and the Future of the Discipline by Laura Gray-Rosendale Barbara Bird states how there are three different types of identities that students must develop, “1) autobiographical writer identity: generating personally meaningful, unique ideas, 2) discoursal identity: making clear claims and connecting evidence to claims, and 3) authorial writer identity: performing intellectual work, specifically through elaboration and critical thinking” (71)(Gray-Rosendale 93). By learning to engage these identities, students are able to still practice academic writing, while still preserving their sense of self and searching for how their identities impact their writing.

Multilingual pedagogy

Multilingual pedagogy is an educational approach that incorporates multiple languages into classroom instruction to support students from diverse linguistic backgrounds. In many educational settings, multilingual students, scholars that speak two or more languages, often connected to their cultural or ethnic background may rely on internal code-switching between English and their native language to understand classroom instruction. This process can require students to internalize information across languages while learning new material. In response, some schools incorporate multilingual approaches into bilingual educational settings in order to recognize and support students’ linguistic identities. These approaches integrate both English and students’ native language within instruction to create an inclusive learning environment that views multiple languages as a resource rather than a barrier.

The use of translingual practices in bilingual classrooms are used as teaching strategies by teachers that intentionally code-switch to help their students understand the subject to their fullest potential. Even if students speak English, the practice of explaining in both English and their native language allows them to fully grasp lessons and better internalize concepts which they can later use in their work.

Pedagogy in action

A multilingual pedagogy can benefit both teachers and students as most teachers in mixed language classes code-switch intentionally to help their students. Although some students prefer to speak English, giving explanations in both languages allow them to fully grasp lessons. Leading to the increase of subject understanding amongst the students. Teachers that accurately incorporate the language pedagogy into their lessons create a more positive space for students and lead to an increased measured student participation and increased measured comprehension. This creates a boost of confidence for students regarding their cultural identities especially when they intersect with academics such as writing. When teachers use translanguaging methods as effective ways to improve participation and learning for bilingual students they’re also supporting students’ self esteem. A multilingual pedagogy benefits students of all ages. In mixed language classes in Universites translanguaging is already a commonly used practice by both teachers and students. The use of it allowing them to communicate more effectively while better internalizing academic content showing that instead of interfering with English learning, the practice supports development of both languages. The use of a multilingual pedagogy enhances learning especially in context based focused courses in both lower and higher education.

Overall effect

The use of a multilingual pedagogical approach can be used as a bridge to comprehension for multilingual students that can reframe the use of multiple languages as an advantage instead of a barrier. The use of multilingual pedagogical approaches help reshape the use of multiple languages, provided with real classroom research to demonstrate its benefits towards students of all ages, the pedagogy challenges monolingual normalities while influencing future curriculum design, classroom instruction and language policies.

== Towards the future ==
There is now a wealth of research that explores the relationship between identity, language learning, and language teaching. Themes on identity include race, gender, class, sexual orientation, and disability. Further, the award-winning Journal of Language, Identity, and Education, launched in 2002, ensures that issues of identity and language learning will remain at the forefront of research on language education, applied linguistics, and SLA in the future. Issues of identity are seen to be relevant not only to language learners, but to language teachers, teacher educators, and researchers. There is an increasing interest in the ways in which advances in technology have impacted both language learner and teacher identity and the ways in which the forces of globalization are implicated in identity construction. Many established journals in the field welcome research on identity and language learning, including: Applied Linguistics, Critical Inquiry in Language Studies, Language Learning, Language and Education, Linguistics and Education, Modern Language Journal, and TESOL Quarterly.

== Key books ==
Block, D. (2007). Second language identities. London/New York: Continuum

In this monograph, Block insightfully traces research interest in second language identities from the 1960s to the present. He draws on a wide range of social theories and brings a fresh analysis to studies of adult migrants, foreign language learners, and study-abroad students.

Burck, C. (2005/7). Multilingual living. Explorations of language and subjectivity. Basingstoke, England and New York: Palgrave Macmillan.

This book presents a discursive and narrative analysis of speakers' own accounts of the challenges and advantages of living in several languages at individual, family, and societal levels, which gives weight to ideas on hybridity and postmodern multiplicity.

Norton, B. (2013). Identity and language learning: Extending the conversation. Bristol: Multilingual Matters.

In this second edition of a highly cited study of immigrant language learners, Norton draws on poststructuralist theory to argue for a conception of the learner identity as multiple, a site of struggle, and subject to change. She also develops the construct of “investment” to better understand the relationship between language learners and the target language. The second edition includes an insightful Afterword by Claire Kramsch.

Pavlenko, A. and Blackledge, A. (Eds). (2004). Negotiation of identities in multilingual contexts. Clevedon: Multilingual Matters.

The authors in this comprehensive collection examine the ways in which identities are negotiated in diverse multilingual settings. They analyze the discourses of education, autobiography, politics, and youth culture, demonstrating the ways in which languages may be sites of resistance, empowerment, or discrimination.

Toohey, K. (2000). Learning English at school: Identity, social relations, and classroom practice. Cleveland, UK: Multilingual Matters.

Drawing on an exemplary ethnography of young English language learners, Toohey investigates the ways in which classroom practices are implicated in the range of identity options available to language learners. She draws on sociocultural and poststructural theory to better understand the classroom community as a site of identity negotiation.

== Other relevant books ==
- Blackledge, A. & Creese, A. (2010). Multilingualism. London, UK: Continuum.
- Canagarajah, S. (Ed.) (2004). Reclaiming the local in language policy and practice. Mahwah, NJ: Lawrence Erlbaum
- Clarke, M. (2008). Language teacher identities: Co-constructing discourse and community. Clevedon, UK: Multilingual Matters.
- Cox, M., Jordan, J., Ortmeier-Hooper, C. & Schwartz, G.G. (2010). Reinventing identities in second language writing. Urbana, IL: NCTE Press.
- Cummins, J. (2001). Negotiating identities: Education for empowerment in a diverse society. 2nd Edition. Los Angeles: California Association for Bilingual Education.
- Day, E. M. (2002). Identity and the young English language learner. Clevedon, UK: Multilingual Matters
- Garciá, O., Skutnabb-Kangas, T., & Torres-Guzmán, M.E. (Eds.). (2006). Imagining multilingual schools: Languages in education and glocalization. Clevedon, UK: Multilingual Matters.
- Goldstein, T. (2003). Teaching and learning in a multilingual school: Choices, risks, and dilemmas. Mahwah, NJ: Lawrence Erlbaum Associates.
- Hawkins, M. R. (Ed.). (2004). Language learning and teacher education: A sociocultural approach. Clevedon, UK: Multilingual Matters.
- Heller, M. (2007). Linguistic minorities and modernity: A sociolinguistic ethnography (2nd edition). London, UK: Continuum
- Higgins, C. (2009). English as a local language: Post-colonial identities and multilingual practices. Bristol, UK: Multilingual Matters.
- Hornberger, N. (Ed.) (2003). Continua of biliteracy. Clevedon, UK: Multilingual Matters.
- Kanno, Y. (2008). Language and education in Japan: Unequal access to bilingualism. Basingstoke, UK: Palgrave Macmillan.
- Kramsch, C. (2010). The multilingual subject. Oxford: Oxford University.
- Kubota, R. & Lin, A. (Eds.) (2009). Race, culture, and identities in second language education. London and New York: Routledge.
- Lin, A. (Ed.)(2007). Problematizing identity: Everyday struggles in language, culture, and education. Lawrence Erlbaum.
- Lo Bianco, J., Orton, J. & Yihong, G. (Eds.) (2009). China and English: Globalisation and the dilemmas of identity. Bristol, UK: Multilingual Matters
- Miller, J. (2003). Audible difference: ESL and social identity in schools. Clevedon, England: Multilingual Matters.
- Martin-Jones, M., & Jones, K. (Eds.). (2000). Multilingual literacies: Reading and writing different worlds. Amsterdam: John Benjamins Publishing.
- Menard-Warwick, J. (2009). Gendered identities and immigrant language learning. Bristol, UK: Multilingual Matters
- Mohan, B., Leung, C. & Davison, C. (Eds).(2002). English as a Second Language in the mainstream:: Teaching, learning and identity. Longman, UK.
- Nelson, C. (2009). Sexual identities in English language education: Classroom conversations. New York: Routledge.
- Pérez-Milans, M. (2013). Urban schools and English language education in late modern China: A critical sociolinguistic ethnography. New York & London: Routledge.
- Norton, B. & Pavlenko, A. (Eds.) (2004). Gender and English language learners. Alexandria, VA: TESOL
- Pakuła, Łukasz, Joanna Pawelczyk and Jane Sunderland (2015) Gender and sexuality in English language education: Focus on Poland. London: British Council.
- Potowski, K. (2007). Language and identity in a dual immersion school. Clevedon, UK: Multilingual Matters.
- Ramanathan, V. (2005). The English-vernacular divide: Postcolonial language politics and practice. Clevedon, UK: Multilingual Matters.
- Sharkey, J., & Johnson, K. (Eds). (2003). The TESOL Quarterly dialogues: Rethinking issues of language, culture, and power. Alexandria, VA: TESOL.
- Stein, P. (2008). Multimodal pedagogies in diverse classrooms: Representation, rights, and resources. London and New York: Routledge.
- Tsui, A. & Tollefson, J. (Eds.) (2006) Language policy, culture, and identity in Asian contexts. Mahwah, NJ:Lawrence Erlbaum.
- Wallace, C. (2003). Critical reading in language education. Basingstoke, England: Palgrave Macmillan.

== Broader literature ==
- Albright, J. & Luke, A. (2007). Pierre Bourdieu and literacy education. Mahwah, NJ: Lawrence Erlbaum.
- Blommaert, J. (2008). Grassroots literacy: Writing, identity, and voice in Central Africa. London and New York: Routledge.
- Bourdieu, P. (1991). Language and symbolic power (J. B. Thompson, Ed.; G. Raymond & M. Adamson, Trans.). Cambridge, England: Polity Press. (Original work published in 1982)
- Fairclough, N. (2001). Language and power (2nd Edition). Harlow, UK: Pearson/Longman.
- Hall, S.(Ed.) (1997) Representation: Cultural representations and signifying practices Sage Publications.
- Janks, H. (2009). Literacy and power. London and New York: Routledge.
- May, S. (2008). Language and minority rights. London and New York: Routledge.
- Norton, B., & Toohey, K. (Eds). (2004). Critical pedagogies and language learning. New York: Cambridge University Press.
- Pennycook, A. (2007). Global Englishes and transcultural flows. London and New York: Routledge.
- Prinsloo, M. & Baynham, M. (Eds.) (2008). Literacies, global and local. Philadelphia, USA: John Benjamins.
- Rahimian, M. (2018). Accent, intelligibility, and identity in international teaching assistants and internationally-educated instructors. University of Manitoba.
- Rampton, B. (2006) Language in late modernity: Interaction in an urban school. Cambridge: Cambridge University Press.
- Rassool, N. (2007). Global issues in language, education, and development: Perspectives from postcolonial countries. Clevedon, UK: Multilingual Matters.
- Warschauer, M. (2003). Technology and social inclusion: Rethinking the digital divide. Boston: MIT Press
- Weedon, C. (1997). Feminist practice and poststructuralist theory (2nd Edition). Oxford: Blackwell.
- Wenger, E. (1998). Communities of practice: Learning, meaning, and identity. Cambridge: Cambridge University Press.

== Footnotes and references ==
Davila, Bethany. (2017). Standard English and colorblindness in composition studies: Rhetorical constructions of racial and linguistic neutrality. WPA: Writing Program Administration 40.2, 154-173.

Given, Michael; Jean A. Wagner; Leisa Belleau; Martha Smith. (2007). 'Who, me?' Four pedagogical approaches to exploring student identity through composition, literature, and rhetoric. Writing Instructor Beta 04.0.

Gray-Rosendale, Laura. (1997). Everyday exigencies: Constructing student identity. In Penrod, Diane (Ed.), Miss Grundy doesn't teach here anymore: Popular culture and the composition classroom; Portsmouth, NH: Boynton/Cook (pp. 147-159).

- Anderson, B. (1991). Imagined communities: Reflections on the origin and spread of nationalism (Rev. ed.). London: Verso.
- Bourdieu, P. (1991). Language and symbolic power (J. B. Thompson, Ed.; G. Raymond & M. Adamson, Trans.). Cambridge, England: Polity Press. (Original work published in 1982).
- Kanno, Y., & Norton, B. (Eds.). (2003). Imagined communities and educational possibilities [Special issue]. Journal of Language, Identity, and Education, 2(4).
- Lave, J., & Wenger, E. (1991). Situated learning: Legitimate peripheral participation. Cambridge: Cambridge University Press.
- Norton Peirce, B. (1995). Social identity, investment, and language learning. TESOL Quarterly, 29(1), 9-31.
- Norton, B. (1997). Language, identity, and the ownership of English. [Introduction, Special Issue] TESOL Quarterly, 31(3), 409-429.
- Norton, B. (2000). Identity and language learning: Gender, ethnicity and educational change. Harlow, England: Longman/Pearson Education Limited.
- Pavlenko, A., & Norton, B. (2007). Imagined communities, identity, and English language teaching. In J. Cummins & C. Davison (Eds.), International handbook of English language teaching (pp. 669–680). New York: Springer.
- Weedon, C. (1997). Feminist practice and poststructuralist theory (2nd Edition). Oxford: Blackwell.
- Wenger, E. (1998). Communities of practice: Learning, meaning, and identity. Cambridge: Cambridge University Press.
