= African Storybook =

South African literacy initiative

- Formation: 2014
- Type: Nonprofit
- Headquarters: Johannesburg, South Africa
- Region served: Sub-Saharan Africa
- Services: Education, e-learning
- Parent organization: Saide
- Website: africanstorybook.org

The African Storybook (ASb) is a multilingual literacy initiative that works with educators and children to publish openly licensed picture storybooks for early reading in the languages of Africa. An initiative of Saide, the ASb has an interactive website that enables users to read, create, download, translate, and adapt storybooks. The initiative addresses the dire shortage of children's storybooks in African languages, crucial for children's literacy development. As of March 2023, the website had 3 800 original titles, 7 266 translations and 236 languages represented.

== Background ==
According to the UNESCO's 2013/2014 Education for All Global Monitoring Report, 30 million children in sub-Saharan Africa are out of school and over half of the children who reach grade 4 are not learning the basics in reading. These challenges are related to and exacerbated by the shortage of children's reading material available in Africa, particularly in African languages; the major impetus for the ASb. Developing mother tongue literacy before transitioning to a language of wider communication (e.g., English or French) is the policy in most sub-Saharan countries, and supported by the African Storybook initiative.

Due to the low purchasing power and demand for storybooks in Africa, along with the large number of languages, conventional publishing produces relatively few titles, in African languages. The open license digital publishing model of the African Storybook initiative, by contrast, makes it possible for people to custom publish their own storybooks, to print storybooks, and to read them on mobile devices. The ASb also places content creation in the form of writing and translation in the hands of the communities who need storybooks for early reading in familiar languages.

The ASb was given start-up funding by Comic Relief from the United Kingdom, and is now funded by various sources, including the Cameron Schrier Foundation, the Zenex Foundation and the Oppenheimer Memorial Trust. Tessa Welch, the project leader and one of the founders died in July 2020. Saide continues to remain the home of the initiative, providing support and guidance to the small team of in-house staff and consultants.

African Storybook is officially recognized as a Digital Public Good .

== Storybooks ==
Virtually all the storybooks on the site are by African authors, with content ranging from traditional folktales and contemporary stories to poems, traditional games and songs. Authors are mostly educators – teachers, librarians, academics – who contribute stories in order to have storybooks for their educational contexts and to promote their languages. 5525 storybooks (as of March 2023) have been “ASb-approved”, meaning that the initiative has checked the content and language in the storybooks. All the stories are illustrated, either by professional illustrators in various African countries or by the users themselves. Recent emphasis has been on non-fiction storybooks and also on generating storybooks in African languages.

== Development ==
The official launch of the website took place in Pretoria, South Africa, in June 2014, with funding from the European Union. The same month there was an ASb summit at the University of British Columbia in Vancouver to advance the goals of the initiative and forge connections with other organisations.

=== Pilot countries ===
To test and get feedback on the website and stories, ASb worked in 2014/2015 with 14 pilot sites in South Africa, Kenya, Lesotho and Uganda – schools and community libraries that represent the target audience of the initiative. The pilot sites experimented with various methods of storybook delivery suitable for rural and peri-urban African contexts: digital projection of downloaded stories using standard data projectors and low-cost print versions of the storybooks for individual reading. In addition, there is strong advocacy to promote systemic implementation in schools, teacher education and the library networks in the pilot countries. Currently, ASb works with local-language champions in several countries to promote storybook development and translation into Africa languages. e.g.

=== Champions ===
ASb Champions are individuals in several African countries whom Saide supports to promote ASb storybooks and apps in their communities, often in partnership with local schools and libraries. Champions translate stories into languages that have few or no existing storybooks, and some use the ASb Maker app to write new stories, including with children. Saide provides them with tablets, data stipends and ongoing support from a coordinator. Saide reported that the number of active Champions rose from 10 to 20 by 2024, and that Champions had directly reached about 15,000 children and 3,800 educators.

=== Apps ===
ASb has developed two apps which complement its website. African Storybook Reader allows storybooks to be downloaded on to a smartphone or tablet and read offline. With African Storybook Maker, a user can make their own picture storybooks offline on a smartphone using their own photos or with illustrations from the ASb image library. Storybooks created on a mobile device can be sent to the main ASb website (for sharing and printing) when the device is connected to the Internet.

== Partner organisations and partner projects ==
Social Impact Publishing Partners are key to the ASb, as it relies on other organisations and individual champions to advocate for local language storybooks in countries across the continent. Partnerships with people and organisations in communities are also crucial to ensuring that the published storybooks are appropriate for children in those communities. Some of ASb key partners include iMlango which works in over 200 primary schools in Kenya and has recently expanded to Nigeria; eKitabu which adapts ASb storybooks in formats accessible by learners with disabilities and works in 13 African countries; Kenya Institute of Curriculum Development's KEC, a platform from which primary schools with government tablets can access storybooks; Vodacom Classrooms; World Reader; Learning Equality; Centre for the Study of Learning Performance (CSLP) READS Programme; YouScribe; Pratham Books' Storyweaver, Book Dash, Room to Read, Molteno Foundation, Nelson Mandela Institute, Nal’ibali, Little Zebra Books, and READ Educational Trust. The independent Global African Storybook Project was created in 2015 with the goal of translating the open-license ASb materials into non-African languages so that African stories can be accessible to children beyond the African continent. Storybooks Canada provides 40 stories from the African Storybook in the major immigrant and refugee languages of Canada with text and audio.

== Stories of Use ==
In addition to a multilingual collection of storybooks, the website offers educator support material and stories of use of the books by ASB partners and supporters. The stories of use provide examples of how the storybooks and publishing tools have been used in various settings across Africa.
