= RELC Journal =

- Discipline: Language teaching
- Language: English
- Edited by: Alvin Pang and Marie Alina Yeo

Publication details
- History: 1970-present
- Publisher: SAGE Publications
- Frequency: Triannually

Standard abbreviations
- ISO 4: RELC J.

Indexing
- ISSN: 0033-6882 (print); 1745-526X (web)
- LCCN: 70942448
- OCLC no.: 1906527

Links
- Journal homepage; Online access; Online archive

RELC Journal is a triannual peer-reviewed academic journal that covers the field of language learning. It was established in 1970 and is currently published by SAGE Publications on behalf of the Regional Language Centre (RELC) of the Southeast Asian Ministers of Education Organization (SEAMEO). The journal's editors-in-chief are Graeme Cane, Alvin Pang, and Marie Alina Yeo (SEAMEO RELC, Singapore).

== Abstracting and indexing ==
RELC Journal is abstracted and indexed in:

- Academic Complete
- Academic Premier
- Scopus
- ZETOC
