= Language Teaching Research =

- Discipline: Linguistics
- Language: English
- Edited by: Hossein Nassaji; María del Pilar García Mayo

Publication details
- History: 1997–present
- Publisher: SAGE Publications
- Frequency: Quarterly
- Impact factor: 3.401 (2022)

Standard abbreviations
- ISO 4: Lang. Teach. Res.

Indexing
- CODEN: LTREFI
- ISSN: 1362-1688 (print); 1477-0954 (web)
- LCCN: 97660653
- OCLC no.: 300342940

Links
- Journal homepage; Online access; Online archive

Language Teaching Research is a peer-reviewed journal that publishes research within the area of second or foreign language teaching. Although articles are written in English, the journal welcomes studies dealing with the teaching of languages other than English as well. The journal's editors-in-Chief are Hossein Nassaji (University of Victoria) and María del Pilar García Mayo (University of the Basque Country). The journal was established in 1997 and is currently published by SAGE Publications. The journal is a venue for studies that demonstrate sound research methods and which report findings that have clear pedagogical implications. A wide range of topics in the area of language teaching is covered, including:Programme Syllabus Materials design Methodology The teaching of specific skills and language for specific purposes

== Abstracting and indexing ==
Language Teaching Research is abstracted and indexed in Scopus and the Social Sciences Citation Index. According to the Journal Citation Reports, its 2022 impact factor is 3.401, ranking it 21 out of 194 journals in the category "Linguistics", its 5-year impact is 4.815, ranking it 12 out of 194 in the category "Linguistics" and 73 out of 267 journals in the category "Education & Educational Research". The journal is abstracted and indexed by:

- Academic Search Premier
- Contents Pages in Education
- Current Index to Journals in Education
- Educational Research Abstracts Online - e-Psyche
- IBZ: International Bibliography of Periodical Literature
- IBZ: International Bibliography of Periodical Literature in the Humanities and Social Sciences
- International Bibliography of Book Reviews of Scholarly Literature in the Humanities and Social Sciences
- International Bibliography of Book Reviews of Scholarly Literature on the Humanities and Social Sciences
- Language Teaching
- Linguistics Abstracts
- Linguistics and Language Behavior Abstracts
- MLA Abstracts of Articles in Scholarly Journals
- MLA International Bibliography
- Social Science Abstracts
- Sociological Abstracts
