= Language Teaching (journal) =

- Discipline: Language and Linguistics
- Language: English
- Edited by: Graeme Porte

Publication details
- History: 1968–present
- Publisher: Cambridge University Press (United Kingdom)
- Frequency: Quarterly : January, April, July and October

Standard abbreviations
- ISO 4: Lang. Teach.

Indexing
- ISSN: 0261-4448 (print); 1475-3049 (web)

Links
- Journal homepage

Language Teaching is an academic journal in language education that publishes approximately 30 research articles a year in the field of second-language teaching and learning. Published by Cambridge University Press, papers focus on specific topics, languages and countries. There are also replication, research articles, survey of doctoral dissertations, topic based research timelines, key conference speeches, comparative book reviews, research reports from organizations and colloquia, and an annual round-up of the most significant work published on second-language teaching and learning.

It was founded in 1968, first titled as English Teaching Abstracts. The title was soon changed to Language-Teaching Abstracts (UK 0023–8279) until 1975. From 1975 to 1982, it was known as Language Teaching and Linguistics Abstracts (UK 0306–6304).

This journal is currently indexed in:

- Scorpus
- Social Sciences Citation Index
- Arts and Humanities Citation Index,
- EBSCOhost
- Linguistics and Language Behavior Abstracts,
- MLA International Bibliography
- ProQuest

The journal has ties with The National Centre for Languages (CiLT) and the British Council through its editorial board.

== Notable articles ==
- "Conversation Analysis and language learning" - Paul Seedhouse, October 2005 38:4, pp 165-187
- "Autonomy in language teaching and learning" - Phil Benson, January 2007 40:1, pp 21-40
- "Standards of English and politics of inclusion" - Adrian Holliday, January 2008 41:1, pp 119-130
- "Non-native English-speaking English language teachers: History and research" - Lucie Moussu and Enric Llurda, July 2008 41:3, pp 315-348

== See also ==
- List of applied linguistics journals
