= Scott Crossley =

American linguist

Scott Andrew Crossley
- Born: 1 August 1973 (age 53); Simi Valley, California, US
- Education: California State University, Northridge (BA); University of Memphis (MA, PhD)
- Known for: Second language writing; Coh-Metrix
- Scientific career
- Fields: Second language acquisition; Computational linguistics; Natural language processing; Second language writing
- Workplaces: Vanderbilt University; Georgia State University; Mississippi State University
- Thesis: A computational approach to assessing second language reading texts. (2006)
- Website: shared.cas.gsu.edu/profile/crossley-scott

Scott Andrew Crossley (born 1973) is an American linguist. He is a professor of applied linguistics at Vanderbilt University, United States. His research focuses on natural language processing and the application of computational tools and machine learning algorithms in learning analytics including second language acquisition, second language writing, and readability. His main interest area is the development and use of natural language processing tools in assessing writing quality and text difficulty.

Along with Cumming, Hyland, Kormos, Matsuda, Manchón, Ortega, Polio, Storch and Verspoor he is considered one of the most prominent researchers on second language writing.

== Career ==
Crossley obtained his Bachelor of Arts degree in history at the California State University of Northridge in 1999. In the same year he obtained a Teaching English as a second or foreign language certificate at the University of Memphis. He got his Master of Arts degree in English language at the University of Memphis in 2002 and a Doctor of Philosophy degree in 2006.

== Research ==
Crossley is noted for his work on second language acquisition with a special focus on second language writing and second language vocabulary. In his research he focused on coherence, cohesion, latent semantic analysis, hypernymy and readability. He is noted for the use of computational tools such as Coh-Metrix.

Crossley has been involved in the development of numerous natural language processing tools such as Constructed Response Analysis Tool (CRAT), Sentiment Analysis and Cognition Engine (SEANCE), Simple NLP (SiNLP), Tool for the Automatic Analysis of Lexical Sophistication (TAALES), Tool for the Automatic Analysis of Text Cohesion (TAACO), Tool for the Automatic Analysis of Syntactic Sophistication and Complexity (TAASSC).

== Publications ==
Crossley's work has been published in the Written Communication, The Modern Language Journal, TESOL Quarterly, Journal of Second Language Writing, Language Learning, and Studies in Second Language Acquisition.

== Bibliography ==
=== Articles ===
- McNamara, Danielle S.; Crossley, Scott A.; McCarthy, Philip M. (January 2010). "Linguistic Features of Writing Quality". Written Communication. 27 (1): 57–86. doi:10.1177/0741088309351547. S2CID 27692609.
- Crossley, Scott A.; Louwerse, Max M.; McCarthy, Philip M.; McNamara, Danielle S. (March 2007). "A Linguistic Analysis of Simplified and Authentic Texts". The Modern Language Journal. 91 (1): 15–30. doi:10.1111/j.1540-4781.2007.00507.x.
- Crossley, Scott A.; Greenfield, Jerry; McNamara, Danielle S. (September 2008). "Assessing Text Readability Using Cognitively Based Indices". TESOL Quarterly. 42 (3): 475–493. doi:10.1002/j.1545-7249.2008.tb00142.x.
- Crossley, Scott A.; McNamara, Danielle S. (June 2009). "Computational assessment of lexical differences in L1 and L2 writing". Journal of Second Language Writing. 18 (2): 119–135. doi:10.1016/j.jslw.2009.02.002.
- Crossley, Scott A.; Allen, David B.; McNamara, Danielle S. (April 2011). "Text readability and intuitive simplification: A comparison of readability formulas". Reading in a Foreign Language. 23 (1): 86–101. hdl:10125/66657. ProQuest 1705666907.
