= Rosalind Ivanić =

British linguist and professor (born 1949)

- Born: 20 July 1949 (age 77); Zagreb, Socialist Federal Republic of Yugoslavia
- Known for: Literacy; Intertextuality; Multimodal communication; Adult literacy; Educational linguistics; Critical language awareness; Punctuation; Second language writing

Academic background
- Education: Lancaster University

Academic work
- Discipline: Linguist
- Sub-discipline: Literacy; Intertextuality; Multimodal communication; Adult literacy; Educational linguistics; Critical language awareness; Punctuation; Second language writing
- Institutions: Westminster Kingsway College; Lancaster University
- Website: Ivanić on the website of Lancaster University

Rosalind Ivanić (born 1949) is a Yugoslav-born British linguist. She is currently an honorary professor at the Department of Linguistics and English Language of Lancaster University, United Kingdom. Her research focuses on applied linguistics with a special focus on literacy, intertextuality, multimodal communication, adult literacy, educational linguistics, critical language awareness, punctuation, and second language writing. Along with Theo van Leeuwen and David Barton, she is considered one of the most prominent researchers on literacy.

== Career ==
Ivanić taught English language, literacy and study skills to children and adults in Devon, London and Stockton, California between 1970 and 1985.

She was director of the Language Support Unit at Westminster Kingsway College in London, United Kingdom.

She was a lecturer in adult literacy, language and learning at Garnett College for teachers in further and higher education before joining the staff at Lancaster in 1986.

Ivanić was a full-time member of the Department of Linguistics and English Language of Lancaster University between 1986 and 2008.

She has been an Associate Director of the Literacy Research Centre of Lancaster University since 2002 and she was appointed Professor Emerita in September 2008.

== Research ==
Ivanić's research focused on literacy, intertextuality, applications of Theo van Leeuwen's Theory of Representation, academic discourse practices, writing practices in both academic and non-academic settings, the link between research and practice, multimodal communication, adult literacy, educational linguistics, critical language awareness, punctuation, and second language writing.

In 1994 Ivanić, along with Lancaster Literacy Research Group including David Barton, claimed that literacy is not a skill but a set of practices which is culturally shaped and embedded in social action.

In a research article, published in the Journal of Second Language Writing in 2001, Ivanić claimed that writing (lexical, the syntactic, the organisational and the material aspects of writing construct identity) conveys a representation of the writer.

In a research article, entitled Discourses of writing and learning to write and published in Language and Education, Ivanić proposed a meta-analysis of theory and research about writing and writing pedagogy. She identified six discourses:

1. skills discourse
2. creativity discourse
3. process discourse
4. genre discourse
5. social practices discourse
6. sociopolitical discourse

== Publications ==
Ivanić has publications in several major journals such as Journal of Second Language Writing, Literary and Linguistic Computing, and Language and Education.

== Bibliography ==
=== Books ===
- Tseng, M. L., & Ivanic, R. (2005). Understanding the relationships between learning and teaching : an analysis of the contribution of applied linguistics. London: National Research and Development Centre for Adult Literacy and Numeracy.

=== Articles ===
- Smith, N., McEnery, T., & Ivanic, R. (1998). Issues in transcribing a corpus of children's hand-written projects. Literary and Linguistic Computing, 13(4), 217–225.
- Camps, D., & Ivanic, R. (2001). I am how I sound: Voice as self-representation in L2 writing. Journal of Second Language Writing, 10(1-2), 3-33. doi:
- Bolitho, R., Carter, R., Hughes, R., Masuhara, H., Tomlinson, B., & Ivanic, R. (2003). Ten questions about language awareness. English Language Teaching Journal, 49(4), 251–259.
- Ivanic, R. (2004). Discourses of writing and learning to write. Language and Education, 18(3), 220–245.
