= Vivian Cook (linguist) =

British linguist (1940–2021)

Vivian J. Cook
- Born: 13 June 1940; Salisbury, England
- Died: 10 December 2021 (aged 81); Colchester, Essex.

Philosophical work
- Institutions: Ealing Art College; North East London Polytechnic; Essex University; Newcastle University
- Main interests: Second-language acquisition

Prof. Vivian James Cook (13 June 1940 – 10 December 2021) was a British linguist who was emeritus Professor of Applied Linguistics at Newcastle University.

He was known for his work on second-language acquisition and second-language teaching, and for writing textbooks and popular books about linguistics.

He worked on a number of topics such as bilingualism, EFL (English as a foreign language), first-language acquisition, second-language teaching, linguistics, and the English writing system. He published more than 20 books and 100 papers.

He was founder and first President of the European Second Language Association (EuroSLA), and co-founder of the Oxford University Press journal Writing Systems Research.

He died in December 2021 at the age of 81 and was survived by his wife Pam and two children.

== Early and personal life ==
Cook's interest in second languages began in childhood when he was sent to a Swiss sanatorium to medicate his asthma, where he met speakers of French, Italian, German and Swiss German. Though it was believed at the time that a high altitude improved asthma, it was later suggested to him that the problem was mattress mites, which cannot survive at high altitudes.

Cook was married to his wife Pam for over 50-years after they met at Oxford University.

== Career ==
Cook started his career as a lecturer in EFL and Director of Language Service in London, and during this time he published many innovative EFL textbooks (Active Intonation, 1968; Realistic English, with B. Abbs and M. Underwood, 1968–70; English Topics, 1975, Using Intonation, 1979, English for Life, 1980–1983). In 1978 he became a lecturer in Applied Linguistics at the University of Essex, and in 2004 he got his professorship at Newcastle University.

In the 1970s and 1980s, Cook introduced various research methods in second language acquisition research (elicited imitation, short-term memory measures, response times and micro artificial languages). He favoured an experimental approach to second language research and conducted various experiments. He wrote a textbook about Noam Chomsky's theories (Chomsky's Universal Grammar: An Introduction), and related Universal Grammar to second language acquisition and teaching. He also published papers on second-language teaching and developed Computer-Assisted Language Learning programs for learning English as a foreign language, including adventure games and syntactic parsing programs.

In the early 1990s he proposed the multi-competence approach to second-language acquisition. Multi-competence is "the knowledge of two languages in one mind", and it holds that those who know more than one language have different minds from those with only one language, because knowing two languages changes the way people use their first language, and even the way they think. These multicompetent individuals should be called "L2 users" (pronounced "L two users") rather than "second language learners", because the word "second" has negative connotations, and the word "learner" should only be applied to those who are learning a language (just like a native speaker is not called a "first language learner"). All human beings have the potential for becoming multi-competent, so monolinguals are not indicative of what the human mind can achieve. This has implications for language learners and teachers, for instance the purpose of L2 learning is to become a multicompetent user of more than one language, not to become a copycat of a native speaker of another language; the native speaker is not the best L2 teacher; L2 learners are allowed to use their first language in the classroom. Also, teachers and learners must bear in mind that L2 learning changes how people think. In a paper dated 1997 Cook first argued that knowledge of more than one language can change how people think. He then provided evidence in the first ever workshop devoted to the topic (workshop on "Bilingual Cognition", 2002, within the European Second Language Association conference) and showcased research from a variety of disciplines and languages in his latest edited volume.

Cook also researched writing systems, especially the English one. He published a textbook about English orthography, co-edited a volume on how people read and write a second language, and was editor of the journal Writing Systems Research (with Jyotsna Vaid and Benedetta Bassetti). In 2004, he published a book called Accomodating Brocolli in the Cemetary: Or, Why Can't Anybody Spell?, which explains English orthography to layreaders.

Cook gave talks in Europe, Cuba, China, Japan, Korea, Malaysia, Singapore, Gaza, Iran, Israel, Canada and the U.S..

== Publications ==
Cook's top cited articles were published in TESOL Quarterly, The Canadian Modern Language Review, Language Learning, Second Language Research, and Language, Culture and Curriculum.

== Bibliography ==
=== Books ===
- Cook, V. J.(1986). Experimental Approaches to Second Language Learning, Oxford: Pergamon, 23–37
- Cook, V. J.(1993). Linguistics and Second Language Acquisition. Basingstoke: Macmillan
- Cook, V. J. (1997). Inside Language. London: Edward Arnold
- Cook, V. J. (ed.) (2003). Effects of the Second Language on the First. Clevedon: Multilingual Matters
- Cook, V. J. (2004). Accomodating Brocolli in the Cemetery. London: Profile
- Cook, V. J. (2004). The English Writing System. London: Edward Arnold
- Cook, V. J., & Bassetti, B. (ed.) (2005). Second Language Writing Systems. Multilingual Matters
- Cook, V. J., & Newson, M. (2007). Chomsky's Universal Grammar: An Introduction. 3rd edition. Oxford: Blackwell
- Cook, V. J. (2009). It's All in a Word. London: Profile
- Cook, V. J., & Bassetti, B. (2011). Language and Bilingual Cognition. New York: Taylor and Francis
- Cook, V. J., & Singleton, D. (2014). Key Topics in Second Language Acquisition. Bristol: Multilingual Matters.
- Cook, V. J., & Ryan, D. (eds) (2016). The Routledge Handbook of the English Writing System. Routledge
- Cook, V. J., & Li Wei (eds) (2016). The Cambridge Handbook of Linguistic Multicompetence. Cambridge: Cambridge University Press
- Cook, Vivian (1 March 2022). The Language of the English Street Sign. Multilingual Matters. doi:10.21832/9781800414570. ISBN 9781800414570.

=== Articles ===
- Cook, V. J. (1991). The poverty-of-the-stimulus argument and multicompetence. Second Language Research, 7(2), 103–117. doi:
- Cook, V. J. (1992), Evidence for Multicompetence. Language Learning, 42(4), 557–591. doi:
- Cook, V. (1999). Going beyond the Native Speaker in Language Teaching. TESOL Quarterly, 33(2), 185–209. doi:10.2307/3587717
- Cook, V. (2001). Using the First Language in the Classroom. The Canadian Modern Language Review, 57(3), 402–423. doi:

== See also ==
- EuroSLA
