= Neomy Storch =

Australian linguist

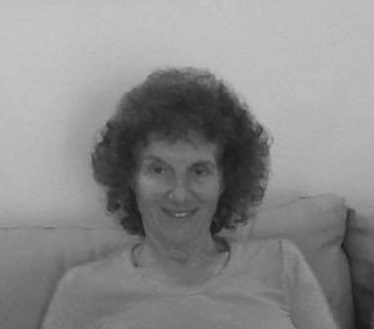
- Born: 9 July 1954 (age 72); Dzierzoniow, Poland
- Education: Monash University
- Known for: Second language writing
- Spouse: Paul
- Children: 2
- Scientific career
- Fields: Second language acquisition; Syntactic complexity; Second language writing
- Workplaces: University of Melbourne
- Website: Storch on the website of the University of Melbourne

Neomy Storch (born 1954) is an Australian linguist who is an associate professor of applied linguistics at the University of Melbourne, Australia. Her research focuses on second language acquisition with a special focus on second language writing. She is noted for her work on second language acquisition, collaborative writing, and academic writing.

== Career ==
Storch obtained her Bachelor of Economics degree at the Monash University in 1976. In 1995 she obtained her Master of Arts degree and in 2001 a PhD at the University of Melbourne.

Since 2010, she has been a member of the editorial board of the Journal of Second Language Writing.

In 2023 and 2024, Storch was the most cited Australian researcher in the field of Foreign Language Learning.

Storch retired from full-time teaching at the end of 2023, but continues to work at the University of Melbourne as an honorary fellow.

== Publications ==
Storch's work has been published in the Journal of Second Language Writing, Language Learning, TESOL Quarterly, Language Teaching Research, Language Testing, System and Studies in Second Language Acquisition.

In 2013 her first book, entitled Collaborative Writing in L2 Classrooms on collaborative writing was published by Multilingual Matters.

== Awards ==
- 2004-2006: Discovery Projects (The role of feedback in second language learning processes) awarded by the Australian Research Council
- 2007: Dyason Fellowship awarded by the University of Melbourne

== Personal life ==
Storch is married and has two adult sons. Storch is related to former Australian Boxing Champion Henry Nissen through marriage. Storch is married to Paul Nissen, a semiretired accountant who sits on the Board of Directors at Sterling Infrastructure Pty Ltd."Our Team".

== Bibliography ==
=== Books ===
- Teaching Writing for Academic Purposes to Multilingual Students. (2017)

=== Articles ===
- "Patterns of interaction in ESL pair work." (2002)
- "Collaborative writing: Product, process, and students’ reflections." (2005)
- "Is there a role for the use of the L1 in an L2 setting?" (2003)
- "How collaborative is pair work? ESL tertiary students composing in pairs." (2001)
- "Pair versus individual writing: Effects on fluency, complexity and accuracy." (2009)
