= Sandra Lee McKay =

American linguist (born 1945)

Sandra McKay (born 1945) is Professor Emeritus of San Francisco State University. Her main areas of interest are sociolinguistics, English as an International Language, and second language pedagogy. For most of her career she has been involved in second language teacher education, both in the United States and abroad. She has received four Fulbright grants, as well as many academic specialists awards and distinguished lecturer invitations.

== Education and career ==
Sandra McKay earned a bachelor's degree in English (1966), a master's degree in American Studies (1969), and a Ph.D. in Applied Linguistics (1971) from the University of Minnesota. After graduation, she went on to earn an international reputation as an educator in the field of English as a Second Language. Her interest in English as an international language developed from her extensive work in countries such as Chile, Hong Kong, Hungary, Latvia, Morocco, Japan, Singapore, South Africa and Thailand.

== Publications ==
Her books include Principles and Practices for Teaching English as an International Language (edited with L. Alsagoff, G. Hu & W. Renandya, 2012, Routledge), Sociolinguistics and Language Education (edited with N. Hornberger, 2010, Multilingual Matters), International English in its Sociolinguistic Contexts: Towards a Socially Sensitive Pedagogy (with Wendy Bokhorst-Heng, 2008, Frances Taylor) and Teaching English as an International Language: Rethinking Goals and Approaches (2002, Oxford University Press, Winner of the Ben Warren International Book Award for outstanding teacher education materials). Her articles appeared in such journals as the Annual Review of Applied Linguistics, Harvard Educational Review, English Language Teaching, International Journal of Applied Linguistics, Journal of Second Language Writing, System, TESOL Quarterly and World Englishes. She has published many chapters in edited books and given plenary talks at various international conferences, including the Asian International TEFL Conference in Korea, the Regional English Language Conference in Singapore and the EFL Asian Conference in Turkey.

== Honors and awards ==
- McKay served as TESOL Quarterly editor from 1994 to 1999 and has served on the editorial advisory board for the Journal of Second Language Writing and TESOL Quarterly.
- She is the recipient of the University of Minnesota Outstanding Achievement Award, 2004
- She is the winner of the Ben Warren International Book Award for outstanding teacher education materials for Teaching English as an International Language: Rethinking Goals and Approaches. Oxford University Press, 2002

== Books ==
- Teaching English Overseas: An Introduction (1992, published by Oxford University Press)
- Sociolinguistics and Language Teaching (edited with Nancy Hornberger, 1996, Cambridge University Press)
- New Immigrants in the US: Readings for Second Language Educators (edited with Sau-ling Wong, 2000, Cambridge University Press)
- Teaching English as an International Language: Rethinking Goals and Approaches (2002, Oxford University Press, winner of the Ben Warren International Book Award)
- International English in its Sociolinguistic Contexts: Towards a Socially Sensitive Pedagogy (with Wendy Bokhorst-Heng, 2008, Frances Taylor)
- Sociolinguistics and Language Education (edited with N. Hornberger, 2010, Multlingual Matters)
- Principles and Practices for Teaching English as an International Language (edited with L. Alsagoff, G. Hu & W. Renandya, 2012, Routledge)
