= TESOL =

TESOL may refer to:

- Teaching English as a second or foreign language
- TESOL International Association, a professional organization for teachers of English as a second or foreign language.
  - TESOL Quarterly
  - TESOL Journal
