= Alister Cumming =

Canadian linguist (born 1953)

Alister Henry Cumming
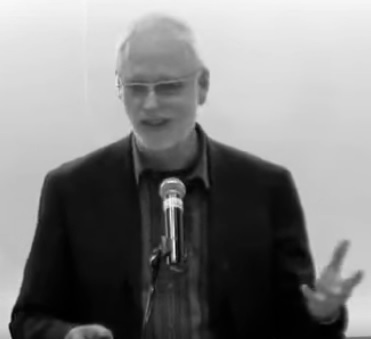
- Born: 14 February 1953 (age 73); Toronto, Ontario, Canada
- Known for: Second language writing; Goal theory
- Scientific career
- Fields: Second language writing
- Institutions: University of Toronto
- Website: Cumming on the website of the University of Toronto

Alister Henry Cumming (born 1953) is a Canadian linguist. He is currently a professor emeritus at the University of Toronto. He is most noted for early studies of composing processes in a second language in the 1980s, establishing that writing skills transfer from first to second languages, adopting Goal Theory from educational psychology to the study of second language writing research, and for his contributions to language testing.

== Career ==
Cumming obtained his Bachelor of Arts at the University of British Columbia in 1975, and a Master of Arts in 1979. He received his PhD at the University of Toronto in 1988.

He has been a member of the editorial board of the Journal of Second Language Writing and a dozen other scholarly and professional journals, including Language Learning, which he edited in the 1990s and for which he was its executive director until 2015.

He was also a member of the project Encouraging The Culture Of Evaluation Among Professionals (ECEP).

== Research ==
Cumming's research is primarily on language writing research. He adopted Goal Theory from educational psychology to study second language writing development. His main claim was that goals can emerge in three different ways: dilemma, intention, or outcome. He also claimed that goals play an important role in the development of second language writing.

In his paper entitled "Learning to write in a second language: Two decades of research," he identified three main areas of research on second language writing: 1. Textual features, 2. Composing processes 3. Sociocultural context.

== Awards ==
- 2014: Changjiang Scholarship from the Chinese Ministry of Education
- 2016: TÜBİTAK scholarship at Yeditepe University
- 2009: Honorary doctorate from the University of Copenhagen

== Bibliography ==
=== Books ===
- Goals for Academic Writing. (2006)
- Adolescent Literacies in a Multicultural Context. (2012)

=== Articles ===
As of 11 September 2018.

- "Learning to write in a second language: Two decades of research." (2001)
- "The contribution of studies of foreign language writing to research, theories and policies." (2009)
- "What needs to be developed to facilitate classroom-based assessment?" (2009)
- "Assessing academic writing in foreign and second languages." (2009)
- "Language assessment in education: Tests, curricula, and teaching." (2009)
- "Comparative research, research syntheses, and adopting instruments in second language writing." (2012)
- "Multiple Dimensions of Academic Language and Literacy Development." (2013)
- "Assessing integrated writing tasks for academic purposes: Promises and perils." (2013)
- "Design in four diagnostic language assessments." (2015)
- "Research for and Within Literacy Instruction in Secondary Schools." (2015)
