= Ahmar Mahboob =

Pakistani linguist

Ahmar Mahboob is a Pakistani linguist and an associate professor at the Department of Linguistics at the University of Sydney. He has worked in the fields of language policy development, pidgin and creole languages, NNEST studies, English language acquisition, English language teaching and teacher education, World Englishes, pragmatics, and minority languages in South Asia. Ahmar earned his PhD from Indiana University Bloomington in 2003, and has published extensively. He was the co-editor of TESOL Quarterly, alongside Brian Paltridge, for several years. He was also the Associate Editor of Linguistics and the Human Sciences and has served on the editorial boards of a number of journals. Ahmar has organised a number of regional, national, and international conferences and is the convener and the co-creator of the Free Linguistics Conference.

== Introduction ==
Mahboob was born in 1971 in Karachi, Pakistan. He first studied English literature at the University of Karachi, and later earned a PhD at Indiana University Bloomington in 2003. His dissertation was entitled Status of non-native English speakers as ESL teachers in the United States. Ahmar has worked in language policy development, pidgin and creole languages, NNEST studies, English language acquisition, English language teaching and teacher education, World Englishes, pragmatics, and issues surrounding minority languages in South Asia. His recent work has focused on Pakistani English and on the various languages of Pakistan. Ahmar is a former president of the Indiana chapter of TESOL International and a former Chair of the NNEST Caucus of TESOL International. Ahmar also convened the 2011 TESOL Convention in New Orleans. Ahmar and Josephine Chen are the co-founders of the FLC Group, a linguistics organization.

Ahmar has made a significant contribution to the Non-native English Speakers in TESOL (NNEST) movement. In reference to Ahmar's work, George Braine, a professor at the Chinese University of Hong Kong, writes that "Over the years, Ahmar Mahboob has made a lasting contribution to the nonnative speaker movement. His doctoral dissertation titled 'Status of nonnative English-speaking teachers in the United States' was one of the first to explore the nonnative speaker issue in English language teaching, and he later became an energetic Chair of the Nonnative Speaker Caucus within the TESOL organization." In addition to his PhD research, Ahmar's book, The NNEST Lens, received critical acclaim. In his own words, "The NNEST lens is a lens of multilingualism, multinationalism, and multiculturalism through which NNESTs and NESTs – as classroom practitioners, researchers, and teacher educators – take diversity as a starting point in their understanding and practice of their profession."

In addition to his work with NNESTs, Ahmar has also been working on issues of race and religion in the community of teachers teaching English to speakers of other languages (TESOL). Among other things, Ahmar introduced the notion of "enracement". For Ahmar, the verb enrace means acquiring one's awareness of race. He writes that "[t]he verb enrace does not only mean that we are enraced by others – that others cause us to construct our racial identity – but, also that we enrace others – that our actions, behaviors, and/or discourses lead to a (re)negotiation of other people's racial awareness. This process of enracement is a result of our negotiations and interactions with people (both of our own race and other races) and is partly grounded in how other people view, experience, and/or stereotype our race and how we view, experience, and/or stereotype them."

Ahmar's recent research has focused on issues of applicability of linguistics. In his co-edited volume, Appliable Linguistics: Texts, Contexts, and Meanings, he introduces Appliable Linguistics as an approach to language that takes everyday real-life language related problems – both theoretical and practical – in diverse social, professional and academic contexts as a starting point and then develops and contributes to a theoretical model of language that can respond to and is appliable in the context. This approach focuses on the importance of theory and practice being interrelated in linguistics. He draws on work by M. A. K. Halliday as well as J R Martin in developing this framework.

Ahmar has also made considerable contributions to the study of World Englishes, and in particular Pakistani English. His work on Pakistani English includes studies of the phonetics, phonology, lexis, morphology, syntax, semantics, pragmatics, and discourse structure of the language. His more recent work on World Englishes focuses on World Englishes and identity, for example, English as an Islamic language.

More recently, Ahmar has been focusing on the relationship between World Englishes and higher education. He is specifically interested in understanding 'use' based variations in World Englishes. He argues that the relationship between the language of everyday use and that of academic discourses should not be confused in the context of education, and that it is the language of academic discourses that need to be prioritized in educational contexts. An emphasis on everyday language, he argues, can lead to ghettoisation of the students rather than the growth of their knowledge them. In attempting to develop this work, he developed a model of language variation that can be used to situate the current work in World Englishes and English as a lingua franca, as well as open up space to explore how these processes of language variation and convergence need to consider specialized discourses in addition to everyday language.

One more area of interest for Ahmar has been 'identity management', which he defines as any effort made at an institutionalized (macro) or individualized (micro) level to shape, direct, or influence the identities of others. His work in this area predominantly focuses on educational discourses and he demonstrates how English language curricula use language to promote 'normalized' identities that are promoted by the authorities to maintain the status quo in their respective societies and thus maintain socio-economic disparities within the society.

In addition to academic work, Ahmar also writes poems and fiction.

== Publications ==
Some of Ahmar's books and edited volumes include:

- Dreyfus, S., Humphrey, S., Mahboob, A. & Martin, J. R. (2016). Genre pedagogy in Higher Education: The SLATE Project. Basingstoke: Palgrave Macmillan. ISBN 978-1-137-30999-0
- Lai, L., Mahboob, A. and Wang, P. (2016). Multiperspective Studies of Language: Theory and Application. Beijing: Foreign Language Teaching and Research Press. ISBN 978-7-5135-7851-6
- Djenar, D. N., Mahboob, A. & Cruickshank, K. (2015). Language and Identity across Modes of Communication. Berlin and Boston: Mouton de Gruyter. ISBN 978-1-61451-359-9
- Mahboob, A. & Barratt, L. (2014). English in Multilingual Contexts: Language variation and education. London: Springer. ISBN 978-94-017-8869-4
- Li, E. & Mahboob, A. (2012). English Today: Form, functions, and uses. Hong Kong: Pearson. ISBN 978-9-8822-4543-3
- Mahboob, A. & Knight, N. (2010) Appliable Linguistics: Texts, contexts, and meanings. Newcastle: Cambridge Scholars Press. ISBN 978-1-4411-6415-5.
- Mahboob, A. (2010) The NNEST Lens: Nonnative English Speakers in TESOL. Newcastle: Cambridge Scholars Press. ISBN 978-1-4438-1910-7.
- Mahboob, A. & Lipovsky, C. (2009) Studies in Applied Linguistics and Language Learning. Newcastle: Cambridge Scholars Press. ISBN 1-4438-1239-0.
- Mahboob, A. & Knight, N. (2008) Questioning Linguistics. Newcastle: Cambridge Scholars Press. ISBN 978-1-84718-667-6.
