= European Association for the Teaching of Academic Writing =

Academic Association

The European Association for the Teaching of Academic Writing (EATAW) is an academic association supporting scholarly activity in academic writing. The association was first established in 1999 with the first conference being held in 2001. The Europe-wide association has two main activities: a bi-annual conference, and the Journal of Academic Writing.

== The EATAW Conference ==
The EATAW conference is held every two years in a European University. It was first held in 2001 in Groningen. The occasion of the bi-annual conference is when the EATAW board is elected for a term of two years. It also has an active listserv where dynamic conversations occur on timely topics about academic writing in higher education.

Year	Country	Host institution	Keynotes speakers	Source
2001	Netherlands	University of Groningen	Olga Dysthe; Lennart Björk; John Bean	
2003	Hungary	Central European University, Budapest	Ann Johns; Otto Kruse; Claire Furneaux	
2005	Greece	Hellenic American Union, Athens	Lotte Rienecker; Constantie Stephanidis; Katrin Girgensohn	
2007	Germany	Ruhr-Universität Bochum	Kirsti Lonka, Ken Hyland	
2009	The United Kingdom	Coventry University	Sally Mitchell, Christian Schunn, Gabriela Ruhmann	
2011	(Republic of Ireland) Ireland	University of Limerick	Peter Elbow, Katrin Girgensohn	
2013	Hungary	Central European University, Budapest	Paul Kei Matsuda, Christiane Donahue, Bojana Petric	
2015	Estonia	Tallinn University of Technology, Tallinn	Ulla Connor, Caroline Coffin, Jim Donohue, Terry Myers Zawacki	
2017	The United Kingdom	Royal Holloway, University of London	Katrin Girgensohn, Ron Barnett	
2019	Sweden	Chalmers University of Technology, Gothenburg	Chris Anson & Karen Head; Montserrat Castelló Badia; Emma Dafouz Milne	
2021	Czech Republic	Technical University of Ostrava, Ostrava	Dylan Dryer, John Harbord, Madalina Chitez & Otto Kruse	
2023	Switzerland	Zurich University of Applied Sciences, Winterthur	Mark Cielibak, Heidi McKee, Ann Devitt & Kalliopi Benetos	
2025	Portugal	University of Minho, Braga	Suresh Canagarajah, Julia Molinari, Federico Navarro	

== The Journal of Academic Writing ==
The Journal of Academic Writing is a peer reviewed journal established by EATAW. The journal, first published in 2011, generally has one issue a year with articles based on presentations from the preceding conference. The journal has published a number of articles that have been widely cited. These include:

Peer-tutoring in Academic Writing: the Infectious Nature of Engagement by Í O'Sullivan, L Cleary 2014

Student learning and ICLHE–Frameworks and contexts by M Gustafsson, C Jacobs 2013

'What is the Purpose of Feedback when Revision is not Expected?'A Case Study of Feedback Quality and Study Design in a First Year Master's Programme by O Dysthe 2011

Screencast feedback for essays on a distance learning MA in professional communication by K Edwards, AF Dujardin, N Williams, 2012

== See also ==
- Academic writing
- EuroSLA
- CCCC
