= Cognitive and linguistic theories of composition =

Cognitive science and linguistic theory have played an important role in providing empirical research into the writing process and serving the teaching of composition. As for composition theories, there is some dispute concerning the appropriateness of tying these two schools of thought together into one theory of composition. However, their empirical basis for research and ties to the process theory of composition and cognitive science can be thought to warrant some connection.

== Theory ==
The cognitive theory of composition (hereafter referred to as "cognitive theory") can trace its roots to psychology and cognitive science. Lev Vygotsky's and Jean Piaget's contributions to the theories of cognitive development and developmental psychology could be found in early work linking these sciences with composition theory (see Ann E. Berthoff). Linda Flower and John R. Hayes published "A Cognitive Process Theory of Writing" in 1981, providing the groundwork for further research into how thought processes influence the writing process.

While the 1981 model was widely influential, it drew criticism for treating writers as isolated individuals whose cognition operates independently of social context. Bazerman challenged the model's assumption that long-term memory functions as a neutral resource, arguing that what writers know and how they think is fundamentally shaped by their cultural and social contexts. Research in writing development has supported this view, with studies showing that writing is shaped by cognitive, sociocultural, and linguistic factors simultaneously, and that no single dimension fully explains how writers develop over time.

Linguistic theories of composition found their roots in the debate surrounding grammar's importance in composition pedagogy. Scholars, such as Janet Emig, Patrick Hartwell, Martha J. Kolln, Robert Funk, Stephen Witte, and Lester Faigley continued this line of thought around the same time that a cognitive theory of composition was being developed by Flower and Hayes. These scholars, like scholars researching cognitive-oriented composition theory, focused on research providing insight into the writing process but were also committed to providing pedagogical advancements addressing deficiencies, trends, and insights gained from their linguistic research.

== Research ==
=== Cognitive theory ===
A cognitive theory is focused on gaining insight into the writing process through the writer's thought processes. Composition theorists have attacked the problem of accessing writers' thoughts in various ways. Flower and Hayes' essay, "A Cognitive Process Theory of Writing" sought to outline the writer's choice-making throughout the writing process, and how those choices constrained or influenced other choices down the line. Other research has focused on capturing the cognitive processes of writers during the writing process through note-taking or speaking aloud, while some early research by Birdwell, Nancrow, and Ross was done with computers to record writers' keystrokes during the writing process.

More recent research has drawn on neuroscience to examine how writing shapes the brain itself. Studies suggest that sustained engagement with writing and academic genres produces measurable neurological changes. This is similar to what is observed when people develop expertise in other complex skills, and writers' identities shift alongside this development. Research has also examined the role of self-efficacy, a concept drawn from Bandura's Social Cognitive Theory referring to a writer's confidence in their ability to complete writing tasks and students' belief in their own writing ability. Hwang's findings show that how learners perceive and respond to feedback shapes both their confidence and their capacity to regulate their own writing process.

=== Applied linguistics ===
Linguistic composition theory has traditionally focused on sentence and paragraph-level composition, with the goal of providing instructors insights into the way students write at various proficiency levels. Stephen Witte and Lester Faigley utilized detailed syntactic analysis to redefine the importance of cohesion and coherence in judging writing quality. Paul Rodgers and Richard Braddock focused on paragraph structure, in separate studies, in order to dispel common misjudgments about the importance of traditional paragraph structure.

Applied linguistics, specifically EFL/ESL studies, has played a large role in the development of linguistic theories of composition. Liz Hamp-Lyons' research in ESL/EFL writing assessment is valuable in informing ESL composition pedagogy. Paul Kei Matsuda, has illustrated the deficiency in ESL composition research, and recent compilations by Matsuda and others have attempted to bridge the gap between ESL instruction and composition theory by presenting pedagogical, theoretical, and assessment frameworks in the ESL composition classroom.

== Pedagogy ==
Cognitive and linguistic theories of composition are heavily tied to process theory. Cognitive and linguistic theories have been instrumental in providing respected empirical research to the field of composition theory, but tend to stay away from making pedagogical suggestions. Instead, research in these fields is typically intended to inform process theory by providing data analysis regarding the writing process, and by bringing scientific research to the field.

The claim that cognitive and linguistic theories "tend to stay away from making pedagogical suggestions" has been contested by more recent scholarship. Riopelle reviewed a major collection on cognition and writing in 2025 that noted a clear shift toward applying cognitive research in classroom settings. This includes deliberate writing instruction; there were measurable gains, particularly in developing habits of mind such as metacognition, persistence, and curiosity. Clark similarly argued that repeated reflective practice in writing classrooms produces lasting neurological and identity changes in student writers. Her article suggests cognitive writing research has direct and practical implications for teaching.

== Notable researchers ==
- Paul Kei Matsuda
- Rosa Manchón
