= List of applied linguistics journals =

This is a list of notable academic journals covering applied linguistics in English.

- Applied Linguistics
- Assessing Writing
- Bilingualism: Language and Cognition
- ITL - International Journal of Applied Linguistics
- Journal of Child Language
- Journal of Second Language Writing
- Language Acquisition
- Language Learning
- Language Teaching
- Language Teaching Research
- Language Testing
- The Modern Language Journal
- Novitas-ROYAL
- Reading and Writing
- System
- TESOL Journal
- TESOL Quarterly
- Writing Systems Research
