= Language power =

Measure of ability to communicate in a given language

Language power (LP) is a measure of the ability to communicate effectively in a given language, specifically one that is not native to the speaker.

Current instructional programs throughout the world continue to attempt to teach enrollees how to communicate in a second language – yet they struggle. They struggle because existing methodologies do not typically result in the learner being able to communicate effectively in the new language. The root cause of this global problem is that learners do not reach a sufficient level of "native-ness" in their speech which hurts the learner's career achievements - despite numerous attempts at language instruction policy and practice reform. Language Power consists of two key components: 1) an ability to speak and be understood, and 2) an ability to listen and understand. Individuals with strong language power possess the ability to communicate effectively in a social environment. When non-native speakers engage in oral communication, native speakers of that language recognize sufficiently well-formed speech, in that it is satisfactorily ‘native’ or sufficiently close to what they know as ‘their language’ in order to be completely understood. When non-native speakers listen to a secondary language, they need to be capable of interpreting and processing words that are spoken at real world rates of speech in the manner spoken by native speakers of that language.

== Overview ==
Each year in the United States, many students are required to learn a language other than English in their educational careers. Often, after years of study and quite likely earning passing grades on final and college entrance exams such as the ACTFL (American Council on the Teaching of Foreign Language) Oral Proficiency Interview, most students cannot speak at a level that will be understood nor can they understand basic everyday exchanges at conversational speed in the language's native country, as one would encounter when watching television or listening to the radio.

Language is taught to a level of certain academic competencies, further referred to as academic knowledge (AK): 1) grammatical competence to include proper use of grammar, extensive vocabulary knowledge, and appropriate pronunciation, 2) sociolinguistic competence, which is the proper use of words and grammar depending on social situations and knowledge of cultural politeness, 3) discourse competence – the ability to use the language in various settings, such as a debate or neighborhood gathering, and 4) strategic competence, the ability to use verbal and non-verbal means to communicate, especially during challenging situations.

Academic knowledge measures are far more prevalent and comprise the majority items we see in formal language assessment. Also known as drill and kill, typical instructional programs continue to focus on rote memorization of vocabulary and grammatical structure instead of practical use of a language – a deficiency in humanization of course material. Furthermore, there is a lack of appropriate materials in an academic setting, driving teachers to create home-made course materials for class. A study by Houston (2005) demonstrated that students learning Spanish valued "survival-skills" learning (ability to function in a social environment) more than academic knowledge of a language. Moreover, teachers report lack of time and resources to practice a language within the classroom to strengthen competency.

Vocabulary items are quite common and take many forms. From simple flash card type exercises to more complex matching games and standard multiple choice, over the years test makers have employed a variety of ways to test the student's understanding of the meaning of a single word. This item type may be useful to increase the total number of words a student understands, however, it is not an indicator of communication competency unless the item combines either identification of real world audio or oral production that connects the speaker to the real world. Second only to vocabulary items in number are grammar items. These items are typically found in written form, on paper or on the computer screen, and typically present the student with a multiple choice selection to fill-in-the-blank or complete/replace language items in a sentence with the response that is grammatically correct.

== Barriers ==
=== Occupational barriers for adults ===
The decision to hire someone for a company position may be, to some degree, dependent on the individual's ability to speak a language effectively. In the majority of cases, similar standardized tests are used as a screening mechanism with adults who are ESL learners. One such test, Speaking Proficient English Assessment Kit (SPEAK) has been used to place ESL learners in appropriate classes and support curriculum improvements. SPEAK, through research and examination of the test, does not realistically measure oral communication competency, leading to invalid results of language fluency and capability to use English in an occupational situation.

The European Union (EU) recognizes the importance of a multilingual and diverse work force; proficiency testing programs, such as the Common European Framework of Reference used in the United Kingdom, gauge potential employees not only on fluency of a second language, but competency. Many potential employees may arrive for an interview and, although have scored high on English proficiency tests, are unable to communicate at a level that gains them a job in an English-speaking nation.

=== Cultural barriers of language ===
Approximately 18% of the US population speak a language other than English, with 11% representing foreign-born individuals. Culture plays a role in how a person learns a language and communicates what they have learned and is substantially social in context. Moreover, lexical and grammatical pieces of language are strongly cultural, leading to a level of language complexity.

Three paradigms can be considered when examining non-native speakers in a US culture: 1) communication apprehension, 2) self-perceived communication competency, and 3) social inclination to communicate. Insufficiencies in oral communication courses for English as a second language learners and appropriate curriculum contribute to the lack of oral communication competencies. These apprehensions contribute to the failure of some foreign students. In a qualitative study among Chinese graduate students, 94% of students reported their academic experience was negative and not enjoyable due to tremendous language barriers. Additionally, study abroad programs were thought to be a cure all for language and cultural barriers. However, students often arrive in their host countries linguistically underprepared.

== Language power theory ==
Language Power, further referred to as Language Power Theory (LPT) is the study of actual communication ability. Communication ability is the competence to speaking to be understood and listening to understand. LPT draws from and supports ideas from language knowledge, understanding there is a pragmatic and social structure that needs to be in place for successful language learning ...since conversation is the most fundamental means of conducting human affairs.

=== Academic knowledge vs. language power ===
Academic Knowledge is what students obtain in traditional language programs in traditional educational institutions. For largely historical, political and commercial reasons these traditional programs center on the course's book. This can be considered book learning because the lack of available, cost-effective technology leaves no other option but to begin learning a language by reading it.

Conversely, Language Power traditionally develops with no book at all, nor any presumption of an ability to read. This is how we all learn our native language. Infants learn to speak their native language because they learn it ‘through their ears’ as a cognitive process, not through a book. To compare the efficacy of these two methods is revealing, in most cases, individuals come fully to master their native language resulting in high degrees of LP while only a fortunate small percentage of learners are able to obtain high levels of language power when learning a second language via traditional methods.

=== Speaking to be understood ===
LPT considers speaking to be understood, a simple transmit and receive process in which the speaker produces oral language that will be understood by a native speaker of that language. Research has shown that among Chinese students, even though the Chinese learners can construct grammatically correct English, it sounds awkward to a native ear. LPT advocates learning language to support the speaker's ability to produce oral language to a certain level of native-ness. Native-ness is the result of sufficient quality of pronunciation, fluency, rhythm and intonation. Research demonstrates that intonation of speech (i.e., pitch, speed, volume, etc.) is an important factor in learning conversational language. It is one of the primary measures of LP because it assesses the speaker's ability to get his message across in a way that is completely understood by the native speaker. Key among these elements is a subset of fluency known as Rate of Speech (ROS) that is often measured in words per minute or more recently in phonemes per second.

Measuring one's ability to speak and be understood has always been challenging since it is usually measured orally during a live interaction - a teacher works one on one with a student, perhaps asking questions and grading oral responses. Naturally, due to budget and time constraints, these types of measurements cannot be done nearly as often as desired. Furthermore, the subjective nature of these types of tests severely dilutes their validity and reliability. Yet, until recently, oral tests have been the only measure used to determine if what the student is saying will be understood by a native speaker of that language. In recent years, several countries have begun to employ computer-aided language learning (CALL) systems to assist their students in learning English. Research has shown in primary and secondary education, CALL programs are more engaging, assist students in cognitive abilities, and can be tailored to meet the needs of the learner.

CALL has been employed to improve speech of ESL learners - however, there is a need to improve software to incorporate different levels of learning, specifically around oral communication. Recent tests of oral language systems show that they would be feasible to use in tangible applications. Furthermore, qualitative studies of computer-based programs proved to be a potent motivator in language learning; the outcome measures positively impacted by CALL were worker participation in union-based activities, such as negotiations, meetings, and a variety of services.

=== Listening to understand ===
LPT considers listening to understand the ability of a person to listen and understand a nonnative language at real world rates of speech with all the attributes of pronunciation, fluency rhythm and intonation. A review of data by Endress and Hauser (2010) demonstrates that adults listen and interpret language based on prosodic cues and these cues vary from language to language. The authors explain that listening to a native language has segmentations, similar to beads on a string, which differentiate words allowing the context to be fully understood. However, for non-native listeners, even if they have studied the particular second language, they have a difficult time segmenting words causing them to simply run together. For example, the authors explain stress (loudness, pitch, and duration) on certain syllables is different between English and French and although listeners can discern some prosodic cues of a foreign language, lack of language power hampers competent understanding. Adult learners of a non-native language depend on lexical information that is already ingrained in their native language. Non-native speech may have different sets of language processing during parsing, which may impact comprehension. These differences can be highly situational, such as in academic listening.

Measurements of listening ability often require at least enough technology to broadcast recordings or require teachers to produce oral language. The biases of oral tests for listening and language comprehension is regrettably apparent when the tests involve a variable amount of teachers’ partisanship on what defines listening comprehension of a language.

Computer Language systems have now come to the forefront and now have the ability to broadcast or playback audio for use in the assessment of listening skills. However, for this type of measurement to effectively measure LP as opposed to AK, the test items must be formed in a way that emulates real world listening. Specifically, the Rate of Speech (ROS) must be that of the real-world. Non-native speakers, when they attempt to use a second language conversationally in a real-time environment, must be able to process and interpret what they hear – at the rate at which the native speaker is speaking.
