= L2 Syntactic Complexity Analyzer =

L2 Syntactical Complexity Analyzer (L2SCA) developed by Xiaofei Lu at the Pennsylvania State University, is a computational tool which produces syntactic complexity indices of written English language texts. Along with Coh-Metrix, the L2SCA is one of the most extensively used computational tools to compute indices of second language writing development. The L2SCA is also widely utilised in the field of corpus linguistics. The L2SCA is available in a single and a batch mode. The first provides the possibility of analyzing a single written text for 14 syntactic complexity indices. The latter allows the user to analyze 30 written texts simultaneously.

== Usage ==
=== Second language writing development ===
The L2SCA has been used in numerous studies in the field of second language writing development to compute indices of syntactic complexity.

=== Corpus linguistics ===
The L2SCA has also been used in various studies in the field of corpus linguistics.

== Indices ==
No.		Construct	Index	Abbr.
1	Syntactic structures		Word count	W
2	Syntactic structures		Sentence	S
3	Syntactic structures		Verb phrase	VP
4	Syntactic structures		Clause	C
5	Syntactic structures		T-unit	T
6	Syntactic structures		Dependent clause	DC
7	Syntactic structures		Complex T-unit	CT
8	Syntactic structures		Coordinate phrase	CP
9	Syntactic structures		Complex nominal	CN
10	Syntactic complexity indices	Length of production units	Mean length of sentence	MLS
11	Syntactic complexity indices	Length of production units	Mean length of T-unit	MLT
12	Syntactic complexity indices	Length of production units	Mean length of clause	MLC
13	Syntactic complexity indices	Overall sentence complexity	Clause per sentence	C/S
14	Syntactic complexity indices	Amounts of subordination	Clause per T-unit	C/T
15	Syntactic complexity indices	Amounts of subordination	Complex T-unit ratio	CT/T
16	Syntactic complexity indices	Amounts of subordination	Dependent clause per clause	DC/C
17	Syntactic complexity indices	Amounts of subordination	Dependent clause per T-unit	DC/T
18	Syntactic complexity indices	Amounts of coordination	Coordinate phrase per clause	CP/C
19	Syntactic complexity indices	Amounts of coordination	Coordinate phrase per T-unit	CP/T
20	Syntactic complexity indices	Amounts of coordination	T-unit per sentence	T/S
21	Syntactic complexity indices	Phrasal sophistication	Complex nominal per clause	CN/C
22	Syntactic complexity indices	Phrasal sophistication	Complex nominal per T-unit	CN/T
23	Syntactic complexity indices	Phrasal sophistication	Verb phrase per T-unit	V/T

== See also ==
- Coh-Metrix
