= David Barton (linguist) =

British linguist

- Born: 1 September 1949; Seaview, Isle of Wight, United Kingdom
- Died: 18 October 2024 (aged 75); Lancaster, United Kingdom
- Known for: Literacy; Academic writing; Ethnography

Academic background
- Education: Lancaster University

Academic work
- Discipline: Linguist
- Sub-discipline: Literacy; Academic writing; Ethnography
- Institutions: Lancaster University; University of Stavanger
- Website: Barton on the website of Lancaster University

David Barton (born Seaview, Isle of Wight, United Kingdom, 1 September 1949, died Lancaster, United Kingdom, 18 October 2024) was a British linguist. He was an honorary professor at the Department of Linguistics and English Language of Lancaster University, United Kingdom. His research focused on applied linguistics with a special focus on literacy, and academic writing. Barton's research also concentrated on the qualitative methodology such as ethnography in applied linguistics.

== Career ==
Barton had been a Professor of Language and Literacies at the Lancaster University since 1993. He also served as the Director of the Lancaster Literacy Research Centre, which is a core partner in the National Research and Development Centre for Adult Literacy and Numeracy.

On 26 January 2006, Barton's opinion on an article entitled The struggle to keep basic skills up to scratch was published on The Guardian. He said that "It is insulting to adults who have problems reading and writing to compare them to children. Adults with problems have the knowledge and experience of the world, and, mostly, lead normal lives. The comparison with children is silly - I wish I could surf the internet, programme the video and download music as quickly as a 12-year-old".

Barton was a visiting professor at the University of Stavanger, Norway.

Barton was the life president of the Lancaster Literacy Research Centre at Lancaster University.

Following his retirement in 2019, he became Professor Emeritus for the Department of Linguistics and English Language at Lancaster University.

On 18 October 2024, he died.

== Research ==
Barton's research focuses on all aspects of language online, including the interaction of words and images, multilingual issues, changes to vernacular practices and learning.

Barton's book, Literacy: An introduction to the ecology of written language, has been published twice. First it was published in 1994 and later in 2007. Michael Stubbs said that literacy emphasises the social approaches to literacy, as opposed to the merely psychological approaches which dominated the field of literacy for many years.

In his book entitled Local literacies: reading and writing in one community, Barton and his co-author (Hamilton) focused on a particular community in Britain by analysing how people use literacy in their everyday lives. Their exploration provides a description of literacy at one segment in time, and also explores the nature and significance of communication to people, households and communities.

Between 2002 and 2009, Barton's research was funded by the Department for Education and Skills as part of a national research and development consortium, the National Research and Development Centre for Adult Literacy and Numeracy (NRDC) to support the major government initiative Skills for Life.

In an article entitled Redefining Vernacular Literacies in the Age of Web 2.0, published in Applied Linguistics in 2013, Barton and Lee examined the characteristics of vernacular literacies on Web 2.0, focusing on the writing activities performed on the photo-sharing website Flickr.com. Their study showed that people draw upon a large array of multi-lingual and multi-modal resources to project new global identities. The writing practices found on Flickr are often changing and new ones are formed out of existing ones.

In a research article entitled Researching writing across the lifespan: The value of literacy studies for highlighting social and contextual aspects of change, published in Writing and Pedagogy in 2019, Barton and his colleagues (Karin Tusting, Sharon McCulloch, Uta Papen, Diane Potts) argued that shifts in material, social and institutional dimensions of context have a huge effect on what individuals write and on the writing practices that they develop. They also emphasised the role of changing tools for writing and values around writing, and the importance of transformations in identity and relationships. In addition, they argued that the tradition of literacy studies research, drawn on by all the projects described in their journal article, provides the theoretical and methodological resources to approach such aspects of academic writing development across the lifespan.

== Publications ==
Barton has publications in several journals such as Applied Linguistics, TESOL Quarterly, Writing & Pedagogy, Discourse, Context and Media, Journal of the European Association of Languages for Specific Purposes, Journal of Child Language, Situated literacies: Reading and writing in context, and Language and education.

== Bibliography ==
=== Books ===
- Barton, D., & Hamilton, M. (1998). Local literacies : a study of reading and writing in one community. London: Routledge.
- Barton, D. (2007). Literacy: an introduction to the ecology of written language. (2nd ed.) Oxford: Wiley-Blackwell.
- Barton, D. P., Hamilton, M. E., & Ivanic, R. (2000). Situated literacies. (Literacies). London: Routledge.
- Barton, D. P., & Tusting, K. (2005). Beyond communities of practice: language, power and social context. (Learning in doing). Cambridge: Cambridge University Press.
- Barton, D., & Lee, C. (2013). Language online: investigating digital texts and practices. London: Routledge.

=== Articles ===
- Barton, D. P. (2000). Images of illiteracy. Literacy Today, 23, 19-20.
- Barton, D. (2005). When the magic of literacy wears thin. Literacy and Numeracy Studies, 14(2), 93-97.
- Barton, D. (2012). Participation, deliberate learning and discourses of learning online. Language and Education, 26(2), 139-150. doi:
- Barton, D., & Lee, C. (2012). Redefining Vernacular Literacies in the Age of Web 2.0. Applied Linguistics, 33(3), 282-298. doi:
- Barton, D., & Potts, D. (2013). Language learning online as a social practice. TESOL Quarterly, 47(4), 815-820. doi:
- Tusting, K. P., Barton, D. P., McCulloch, S. A., Papen, U., & Potts, D. J. (2019). Researching writing across the lifespan: The value of literacy studies for highlighting social and contextual aspects of change. Writing and Pedagogy, 10(3), 401-422. doi:
