= CMLR =

CMLR may refer to:

- Cork and Muskerry Light Railway, Ireland
- Centre for Mined Land Rehabilitation, a mining industry body in Australia
- Canadian Modern Language Review, an academic journal
