= Scott Jarvis =

Scott Jarvis may refer to:

- Scott Jarvis (linguist)
- Scott Jarvis (actor)
