= Novita =

Novita may refer to:

- Nóvita, a municipality in Colombia
- Novita (company), a Finnish textile company
- Novita Children's Services, an Australian organisation
- Novita Dewi (born 1978), Indonesian singer
- Jo Novita (born 1980), Indonesian badminton player
- Novitas – ROYAL, an academic journal
