= Charlene Polio =

American linguist

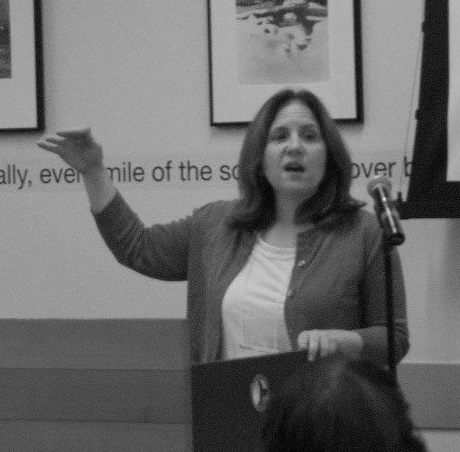
- Polio in 2016
- Born: 14 January 1961 (age 65); New Haven, Connecticut, The United States
- Education: University of Pennsylvania, UCLA
- Known for: Second language writing
- Children: Sara Heins
- Scientific career
- Fields: Second language acquisition; Second language writing
- Workplaces: Michigan State University

Charlene Polio (born 1961) is an American linguist. She is currently a professor in the Department of Linguistics, Languages, and Cultures at Michigan State University, The United States. Her research focuses on second language acquisition with a special focus on second language writing.

== Career ==
Polio obtained her Bachelor of Arts degree in Linguistics in 1983 and her Master of Science degree in TESOL in 1984 at the University of Pennsylvania. In 1992 she obtained her PhD in Applied linguistics at the University of California, Los Angeles.

Polio was the co-editor of The Modern Language Journal. She is co-editor of TESOL Quarterly along with Peter De Costa.

Since April 2018 she has been a member-at-large of the American Association for Applied Linguistics.

== Research ==
Polio's research focuses on second language writing with a special focus on language complexity. She is noted for her research synthesis on accuracy measures, published in Language Learning in 1997. She identified three different types of accuracy measures: (1) holistic scores, (2) error-free units, and (3) error counts.

== Bibliography ==
=== Books ===
- Mackey, A., & Polio, C. (Eds.) (2009). Multiple perspectives on interaction: second language research in honor of Susan M. Gass . London: Routledge.
- Polio, C. G., & Friedman, D. A. (2017). Understanding, Evaluating, and Conducting Second Language Writing Research. Routledge. ISBN 978-1138814684
- Zyzik, E. & Polio, C. (2017). Authentic materials myths: Applying second language research to classroom teaching. Ann Arbor: University of Michigan Press.

=== Articles ===
- Polio, C. G., & Duff P. A. (1994). Teachers' language use in university foreign language classrooms: A qualitative analysis of English and target language alternation. The Modern Language Journal, 78(3), 313–326.
- Duff P. A., & Polio C. G. (1990). How Much Foreign Language Is There in the Foreign Language Classroom? The Modern Language Journal, 74(2), 154–166.
- Polio, C. G. (1997). Measures of linguistic accuracy in second language writing research. Language Learning, 47(1), 101–143.
