= NNEST =

Body of English language teachers that speak English as a second/foreign language

NNEST (/ɛnˈnɛst/ en-NEST) or non-native English-speaking teachers is an acronym that refers to the growing body of English language teachers who speak English as a foreign or second language. The term was coined to highlight the dichotomy between native English-speaking teachers (NEST) and non-native English-speaking teachers (NNEST).

Issues related to NNESTs attract the attention of language teachers, language specialists, teacher educators, and graduate students from all over the world. TESOL (Teachers of English to the Speakers of Other Languages) organization has a NNEST Interest Section. Two local TESOL affiliates in North America, WATESOL (Washington Area TESOL) and CATESOL (California TESOL) have NNEST entities.

== Native speaker vs. non-native speaker dichotomy ==
The term native speaker was defined in the following way by Leonard Bloomfield: "The first language a human being learns to speak is his native language; he is a native speaker of this language". Later on, theoretical linguistics placed the native speaker construct into an idealized position and assumed that a native speaker was the only reliable source of linguistic data by formulating the construct that of an "ideal speaker-listener, in a completely homogeneous speech community," as defined by Noam Chomsky. Since then, the construct has been critically discussed in the field of English language teaching. Some of the researchers argued that second language acquisition research under the dominance of idealized native speaker model creates a "monolingual bias in second language acquisition (SLA) theory", and "elevates an idealized native speaker above a stereotypical 'nonnative' while viewing the latter as a defective communicator, limited by an underdeveloped communicative competence". On the other hand, it was further argued that the native speaker "exists only as a figment of linguist's imagination" and concluded that it is "more like a myth than a reality".

== Status in ELT profession ==
The problematic nature of the native speaker-non-native speaker dichotomy was blended with the growing body of literature discussing the unfair treatment and marginalization of non-native English-speaking teachers in the ELT profession. Robert Phillipson (1992) formulated "native speaker fallacy", which suggests that the ideal teacher of English is a native speaking teacher. Being a non-native speaking teacher was considered to be a distinct quality by George Braine (1999) who argued that "the very fact that non-native speakers of a language have undergone the process of learning a language makes them better qualified to teach the language than those who are born to it".
The inappropriateness of discriminatory practices against NNESTs in English language teaching profession was highlighted by George Braine (1999) as follows:

"...highly ironic, considering the profession's strident championing of multiculturalism, diversity, and other sociopolitical causes, often on behalf of ESL students and immigrants. Although ESL students are praised and admired for the multiculturalism and diversity they bring into language classes, non-native English teachers, who can contribute their rich multicultural, multilingual experiences, are often barred from the same classes."

Peter Medgyes (1994) characterized native English-speaking teachers as informal, flexible, and confident and characterize NNEST as follows :

- good role models
- effective provider of learning strategies
- suppliers of information about the English language
- better anticipators of language learning difficulties
- sensitive to language learners' needs
- facilitators of language learning as a result of shared mother tongue

A number of edited volumes were published on issues related to NNESTs.

=== Advantages of using the term "NNEST" ===
There are basically two arguments that support the use of term "non-native English-speaking teachers". First, it is believed that the term is necessary to distinguish between native and non-native English-speaking teachers as well as strengths attributed to these groups. Second, it is also believed that the term is necessary to highlight the discrimination based on the dichotomy.

=== Disadvantages of using the term "NNEST" ===
Opponents of the term argue that "differentiating among teachers based on their status as native or nonnative speakers perpetuates the dominance of the native speaker in the ELT profession and contributes to discrimination in hiring practices"(Maum, 2002). Below are some of the alternatives to replace the term "NNEST":

- Anglophone Teachers of English
- Bilingual English Speaking Teacher (BEST)
- Legitimate Teacher of English
- Transnational English Teacher
- Translinguistic English Teachers
- Multilingual/Multicultural English-speaking Teachers
- Diverse English-speaking Teachers

== Discriminatory and anti-discriminatory practices ==
Despite the fact that today, about 80% of English language teachers in the world are non-native English-speaking teachers, English is no longer considered to be an exclusive possession of native speakers, and it "belongs to all people who speak it, whether native and nonnative, whether ESL or EFL, whether standard or non-standard" (Norton 1997), NNESTs encounter discriminatory practices all around the world. There have been several research studies exploring the hiring preferences of administrators which empirically demonstrated the importance of 'nativeness' as a job requirement. In addition, online job repositories such as Dave's ESL Café, Chronicle of Higher Education, or TESOL's Online Career Center host job advertisements which include 'nativeness' as a job requirement. Discriminatory practices against NNESTs in English language teaching generated a series of institutionalized anti-discriminatory practices such as "Statement on Nonnative Speakers of English and Hiring Practices" and "Position Statement against Discrimination of Nonnative Speakers of English in the Field of TESOL". In addition, it was decided in ASEAN 2005 Conference to establish "Centers for English Language Training" in South-East Asian countries to support local solutions to local needs by means of local tools.

== Topics of interest ==
Issues related to NNEST include but not limited to:

- Applications of Critical Race Theory in NNEST research
- Discriminatory hiring practices against NNESTs
- Discriminatory practices in the workplace against NNESTs
- NEST – NNEST Collaboration
- NNESTs' self perceptions (in-service NNESTs and pre-service NNESTs)
- Perceptions of and attitudes towards NNESTs (by their NEST counterparts, by administrators, by their students)
- Teacher education and empowerment of NNESTs
- World Englishes perspectives in NNEST research

== Prominent researchers on NNEST issues ==
- Ahmar Mahboob

== See also ==
- Applied linguistics
- First language
- Native English-speaking Teacher scheme
- Teacher education
