= Katharine Perera =

Katharine Perera (1943-2016) was a Professor of linguistics at the University of Manchester specialising in Children's language development. She was a pro- and later senior pro-vice-chancellor at the University of Manchester. In addition to her scholarly work she was a major contributor to a contentious report for the Department for Education and Science on the national school curriculum in English. One of her recommendations was that "Children should write in standard English when appropriate." Margaret Thatcher the UK prime minister argued for the deletion of the last two words of this sentence .... but they were, at Perera's insistence, retained.

== Selected publications ==
- Perera, K. (1980). The assessment of linguistic difficulty in reading material. Educational review, 32(2), 151-161.
- Perera, K. (1984). Children's writing and reading: Analysing classroom language. Blackwell.
- Perera, K. (1994). Child language research: Building on the past, looking to the future. Journal of Child Language, 21(1), 1-7.
- Perera, K. (2020). Standard English: the debate. In Teaching English (pp. 79–88). Routledge.

== Service ==
- Editor of the "Journal of Child Language", 1986-96.
