= Danielle S. McNamara =

Educational researcher

Academic background
- Education: University of Kansas (BA); Wichita State University (MA); University of Colorado Boulder (PhD)

Academic work
- Discipline: Psychologist
- Institutions: Arizona State University
- Main interests: Reading comprehension; Literacy; Educational technology; Intelligent tutoring systems; Natural language processing

Danielle S. McNamara is an educational researcher known for her theoretical and empirical work with reading comprehension and the development of game-based literacy technologies. She is professor of psychology and senior research scientist at Arizona State University. She has previously held positions at University of Memphis, Old Dominion University, and University of Colorado, Boulder.

In 2015, McNamara received the Distinguished Cognitive Scientist Award from the University of California, Merced. She was selected by the American Educational Research Association (AERA) as a 2018 AERA Fellow in acknowledgement of her theoretical and research contributions to the field of literacy and learning.

McNamara is the founding editor of Technology, Mind, and Behavior, an open-access, peer-reviewed journal published by the American Psychological Association (APA). She has also previously served as president of the Society for Text and Discourse, and serves on the editorial board of Discourse Processes, a multidisciplinary journal published by Taylor & Francis.

== Biography ==
McNamara received her B.A. in Linguistics from the University of Kansas in 1982, and her M.A. in Clinical Psychology from Wichita State University, Kansas, in 1989. In 1992, she earned her Ph.D. in Cognitive Psychology at the University of Colorado, Boulder. During her Ph.D., McNamara conducted research on learning theories with Alice F. Healy and reading comprehension with Walter Kintsch. She moved into educational research after receiving two grants from the James S. McDonnell Foundation to apply cognitive psychology principles to education.

McNamara is the director of the Science of Learning and Educational Technology (SoLET) Lab, where she and her team research and develop intelligent tutoring systems and natural language processing software. SoLET learning technologies like iSTART, a game-based tool to help readers develop self-explanation strategies, and Writing Pal, an intelligent writing tutor with game-based writing guides and automatic feedback, are free to access online through McNamara's Adaptive Literacy website. iSTART and Writing Pal are funded by the U.S. Department of Education through the Institute of Education Sciences.

== Research ==
McNamara's research focuses on the development of intelligent tutoring systems that use game-based exercises to increase learner motivation when practicing reading and writing strategies. She developed the intelligent tutoring system Interactive Strategy Training for Active Reading and Thinking (iSTART), an online application based on the idea of Self-Explanation Reading Training (SERT), which coaches learners to use active reading strategies. iSTART has been found to be as effective as live, one-on-one human tutoring of SERT in improving students' quality of self-explanation when reading.

With Arthur Graesser, McNamara developed Coh-Metrix, a computational tool for evaluating text readability based on measuring levels of cohesion, world knowledge, language and discourse characteristics. Coh-Metrix has made it easier for researchers and publishers to assess text difficulty and cohesion without relying on previous methods that focused primarily on word and sentence length.

McNamara has authored and edited five books spanning the topics of reading comprehension, linguistics, educational technologies, and cognition. These include Reading Comprehension Strategies: Theories, Interventions, and Technologies; Automated Evaluation of Text and Discourse with Coh-Metrix with Arthur Graesser, Philip M. McCarthy, and Zhiqiang Cai; Handbook of Latent Semantic Analysis with Thomas K. Landauer, Simon Dennis, and Walter Kintsch; Adaptive Educational Technologies for Literacy Instruction with Scott A. Crossley; and Cognition in Education (Ed Psych Insights) with Matthew T. McCrudden.

== Representative Publications ==
- McNamara, D.S. (2004). SERT: Self-explanation reading training. Discourse Processes, 38(1), 1–30.
- McNamara, D.S. (2007). Reading comprehension strategies: Theories, interventions, and technologies. Psychology Press
- McNamara, D.S., & Kintsch, W. (1996). Learning from texts: Effects of prior knowledge and text coherence. Discourse Processes, 22(3), 247–288.
- McNamara, D.S., Kintsch, E., Songer, N.B., & Kintsch, W. (1996). Are good texts always better? Interactions of text coherence, background knowledge, and levels of understanding in learning from text. Cognition and Instruction, 14(1), 1–43.
- McNamara, D.S., & Magliano, J. (2009). Toward a comprehensive model of comprehension. Psychology of Learning and Motivation, 51, 297–384.
