= Multi-competence =

Knowledge of multiple languages

Multi-competence is a concept in second language acquisition formulated by Vivian Cook that refers to the knowledge of more than one language in one person's mind. From the multicompetence perspective, the different languages a person speaks are seen as one connected system, rather than each language being a separate system. People who speak a second language are seen as unique multilingual individuals, rather than people who have merely attached another language to their repertoire.

The concept has been backed up by studies showing how the different languages a person learns affect each other. The phenomenon of language transfer, or the first language affecting the second, has long been known. More recent research has also shown that the second language also affects the first in various subtle ways. There is also evidence that people who learn other languages gain general cognitive benefits.

Under multi-competence, the second language speaker is seen as more than the sum of the languages he speaks. This is in contrast with the assumption in much of second language research that the ideal model of a language is the monolingual native speaker. Setting the native speaker as the golden standard implies that second language speakers are somehow deficient in each language that they speak, whereas multi-competence sees them as having gained from learning a second language.

To avoid implying deficiency on the part of second language speakers, Cook prefers the term L2 user to L2 learner. An L2 user is anyone who knows a second language and uses it regularly, irrespective of their language level.

== Nature of the L2 user ==
Central to Cook's argument is the way in which people's language knowledge changes when they learn a second language. He makes three main points:

- L2 users' knowledge of the second language is not the same as native speakers' knowledge of that language.
- L2 users' knowledge of their first language is not the same as that of monolingual native speakers.
- L2 users think in different ways than monolinguals.

=== Knowledge of the second language ===
People learning a second language rarely reach the same level of competence as native speakers. In fact, by definition, they can never become a native speaker of another language. Very few L2 users are at a level where they can pass for a native speaker, but even their knowledge is not exactly the same as that of monolingual native speakers. Most L2 users are immediately identifiable by their foreign accent, and often by their syntax or choice of words. Cook argues that this is not a negative thing, and that L2 users should not be judged to the same standards as monolinguals. Rather, they should be held to the standard of successful L2 users.

=== Knowledge of the first language ===
When people learn a second language, the way they speak their first language changes in subtle ways. These changes can be with any aspect of language, from pronunciation and syntax to gestures the learner makes and the things they tend to notice. For example, French speakers who spoke English as a second language pronounced the /t/ sound in French differently from monolingual French speakers. Also, advanced English users of French judged the grammaticality of English sentences differently from English monolinguals. In addition, when shown a fish tank, Chinese speakers of English tend to remember more fish and less plants than Chinese monolinguals. This evidence suggests that language systems inside a person's mind cannot be viewed as completely separate from one another.

=== Thought processes ===
L2 users think more flexibly than monolinguals, are more aware of language in general, and have better attitudes towards other cultures. For example, English children who had Italian lessons for one hour a week had higher word awareness in English than children who had no language lessons.

== Research ==
At the time the term "multi-competence" was coined, SLA research often relied on comparing an L2 user to native speakers of the L2 using methods of error analysis. The "errors" are usually defined by deviations from language norms and/or grammar rules. L2 users can also be measured based on how well they imitate typical native speakers.

SLA research has suggested a bidirectional influence exists between a bilingual's L1 and L2. The foundational linguistic skills acquired during L1 learning are also utilized during L2 learning, meaning pre-existing L1 knowledge influences incoming L2 knowledge. Going in the other direction, an L2 user's interlanguage can also influence their L1 knowledge, a process known as "reverse transfer". L2 knowledge can influence the L1 in early acquisition stages as well as in later learning. Reverse transfer can result in an L2 user making mistakes when communicating in their L1. In extreme cases reverse transfer can lead to the loss of L1 knowledge. However, these effects are not always negative; L2 users often experience improved L1 reading and writing skills, as well as increased creativity.

A new theory posits that an L2-user has a single lexicon, enabling parallel access to words in both their L1 and L2. When an L2 user is asked to name (or pronounce) words from their L1, units in the presented words that are also found in the user's L2 can be distractors and therefore increase reaction time and/or error rate. If there were separate lexicons for each language, then an L2 user should not become distracted by L2 word units when accessing their L1 knowledge. L2 users often have different voice-onset time (VOT)s than the average speaker of either their L1 or L2.

== Implications for language teaching ==
Multi-competence has two major implications for language teaching. The first is about the question of what the final goal should be for language learners. The multi-competence viewpoint sees the goal of learning as becoming a successful L2 user. Language teaching, therefore, should reflect this: the goals of language learning should be based on what successful L2 users can do, not what monolingual native speakers can do. Also, teaching materials should show positive examples of L2 use and L2 users.

The second implication is for the use of the first language in the classroom. If the first language can never truly be separated from the second language in the mind, it makes no sense to forbid the use of the first language in the language classroom. Cook argues that banning the use of the first language will not stop learners from using it to help with their language learning, it will only make its use invisible to the teacher. Instead, Cook suggests that teachers should think about how they can make use of both languages in suitable ways.

== See also ==
- Critical period hypothesis
- Language transfer
- Multilingualism
- Second language acquisition
- Vivian Cook (academic)
