= Thomas Landauer =

Thomas K. Landauer (April 25, 1932 – March 26, 2014) was a professor emeritus at the Department of Psychology of the University of Colorado. He received his doctorate in 1960 from Harvard University, and also held academic appointments at Harvard, Dartmouth College, Stanford University and Princeton University. During his 25-year tenure as Distinguished Member of Technical Staff at Bell Labs and its successors, where he was the manager of an information science and human-computer interaction research group, he was one of the pioneers of Latent semantic analysis. His publications include:

- The Trouble with Computers, a controversial analysis of the productivity paradox of information technology.
- Psychology: A Brief Overview published in 1972.
- Handbook of Latent Semantic Analysis, co-edited with Danielle S. McNamara, Simon Dennis and Walter Kintsch in 2013.

In 1998, Landauer became the founding president of Knowledge Analysis Technologies (KAT), founded to commercialize his work in automated essay scoring and related technologies, based on latent semantic analysis. KAT was acquired in 2004 by Pearson Education, where Landauer continued to serve as executive vice president until his death.
