= Chomsky's Universal Grammar: An Introduction =

Book by Vivian Cook and Mark Newson

- Third edition cover
- Author: Vivian Cook and Mark Newson
- Subject: Universal grammar and Noam Chomsky
- Publisher: Blackwell Publishers
- Publication date: 1988 (1st ed.); 1996 (2nd ed.); 2007 (3rd ed.)
- Pages: 304 (3rd ed.)
- ISBN: 9781405111874

Chomsky's Universal Grammar: An Introduction is a linguistics book about the concept of universal grammar as proposed by Noam Chomsky. First published in 1988, its third edition was authored by Vivian Cook and Mark Newson and released in 2007.

== Synopsis ==
Noam Chomsky's theory of a universal grammar (UG) aims to describe the grammatical constraints common across naturally arising human language. One constraint is the projection principle—that lexical features are preserved at every syntactic level. A non-constraint is the head parameter, wherein the head can occur at the start of the phrase in some languages and at the end in others. The universal grammar is a study of "I-language" (internalized language), not "E-language" (externalized language). Cook distinguishes Chomsky's linguistic universals from implicational universals.

On first-language acquisition (FLA), Cook presents Chomsky's nativist perspective—that humans are born with innate knowledge of natural language. Cook dismisses after consideration theories that FLA can be explained without nativism through the phenomena of social interaction, learning through praise or punishment (behaviourism), imitation, instruction by native speakers or non-language specific mental faculties. To Chomsky, nativism resolves Plato's Problem of how babies acquire knowledge of language that exceeds their experience.

The book covers, in its first edition, government and binding theory, X-bar theory, theta role, movement, second-language acquisition (SLA). The third edition adds coverage of the minimalist program, a line of research that began in the 1990s, and updates its presentation of government and binding theory.

== Reception ==
David Birdsong, writing in Studies in Second Language Acquisition, reviewed the first edition positively, praising that it has "few rivals for clarity and readability", does much to "elucidate the often misunderstood thinking of Chomsky" and incorporates critiques by Cook that mean the book "does not come across as an apologetic". Birdsong criticised Cook's views on SLA among adults and foreign language teaching, in places, as "casual", "curious" and lacking "practical guidance". He also said that Cook omitted substantial consideration of a contemporary SLA theory question: can knowledge of UG-type constraints "be derived from knowledge of FL" and "general problem-solving methods used by adults"? However, he recommended the book and saw Learnability and Second Languages (1988) as a good companion.

Reviewing the third edition, Ádám Szalontai of Acta Linguistica Hungarica believed that a reader will finish the book understanding "the underlying logic of UG theory and its evolution", such that the authors are successful in their aim of "presenting a broad view to a broad spectrum of potential readers". In contrast to other writings in the field, Szalontai found it "much less technical, concentrating more on theoretical issues", and thus accessible to non-UG researchers. He praised the "understandable and intriguing" first chapter, the fact that "the authors are careful to point out their positions" and the "strong merit" that the reader is shown "not only the problems the theory tries to give answers to but also where the boundary of its inquiry lies". A reviewer for Times Higher Education praised that Cook and Newson "provide a cogent, accessible introduction that situates the still-evolving concept in the broader framework of Chomsky's work".

== Release details ==
- Cook, Vivian (1988). Chomsky's Universal Grammar: An Introduction (1st ed.). Oxford: Basil Blackwell.
- Cook, Vivian; Newson, Mark (1996). Chomsky's Universal Grammar: An Introduction (2nd ed.). Blackwell Publishers. ISBN 9780631195566.
- Cook, Vivian; Newson, Mark (2007). Chomsky's Universal Grammar: An Introduction (3rd ed.). Wiley-Blackwell. ISBN 9781405111874.
