= Second language writing =

Writing performed by non-native users of a language

Second language writing is the study of writing performed by non-native speakers/writers of a language as a second or foreign language. The process of second language writing has been an area of research in applied linguistics and second language acquisition theory since the middle of the 20th century. The focus has been mainly on second-language writing in academic settings.

In terms of instructional practices, the focus of second language writing instruction has traditionally been on achieving grammatical accuracy. However, this changed under the influence of compositional studies, which focused on conceptual and structural properties. Recently, particular attention has been paid to the integration of written texts with other media (multimodality) and to the mixing of languages in online media.

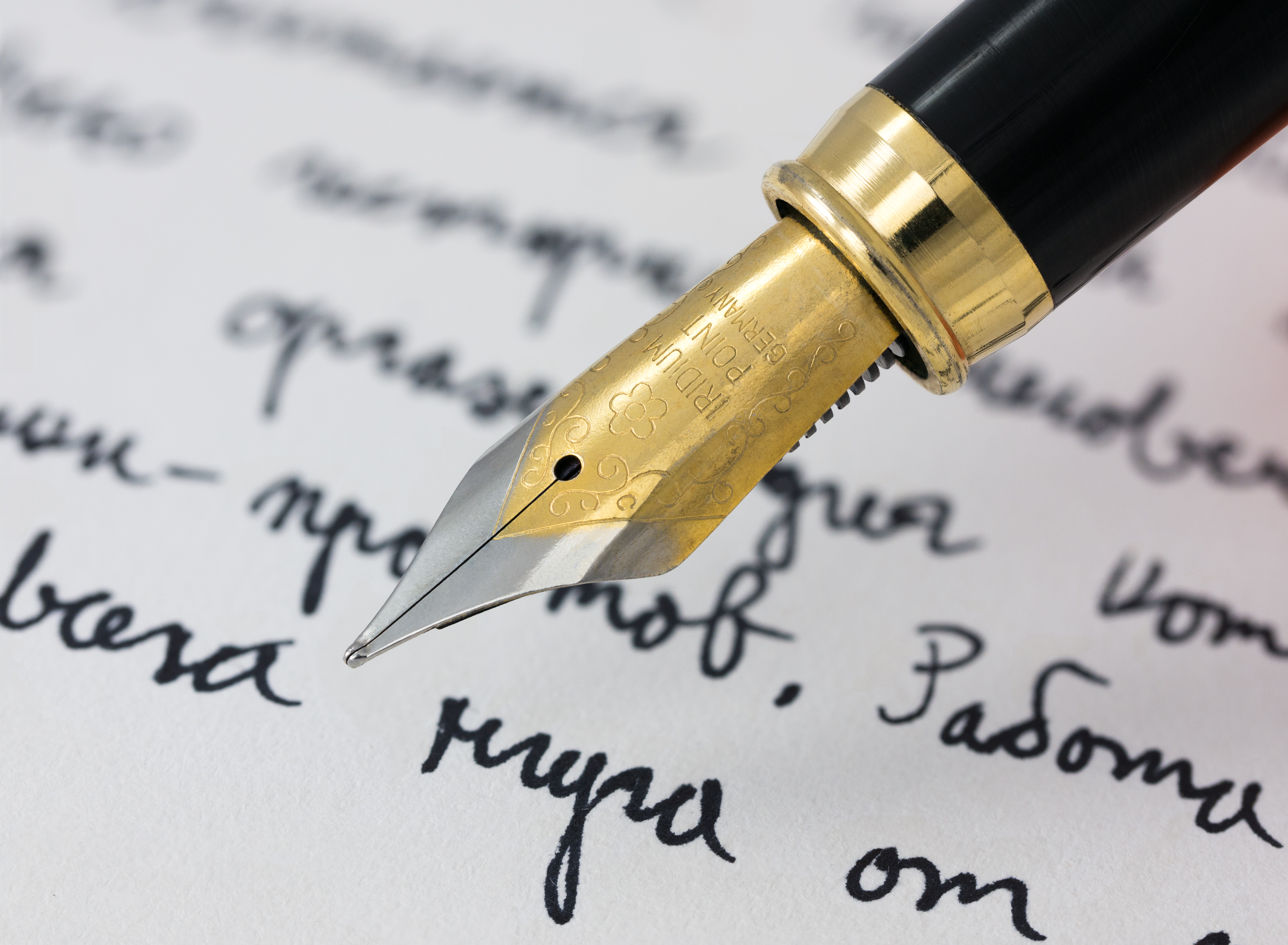

== History ==
Before the 1960s, the focus of English language teaching was on producing or preparing graduates of ESL schools who successfully can pass citizenship tests to be able to work. During industrialization, the most needed skills were reading and speaking skills. Although immigrants struggled with writing in their second language, it was not the necessary skill needed by industrialization at that time. Scholars at that time, mostly phoneticians, argued that spoken language should be placed over the written language and phonetics should serve as the basis for language learning.

Based on Skinnerian Behaviorism (1957), the audio-lingual method came about in language teaching after World War II. The audio-lingual method was initially focused on teaching speaking skills. According to Leki (1992), writing was taught in ESL classes as a component of second language teaching. However, writing does not mean “to create, to express ideas, to synthesize information, to explore thoughts”. Even US higher education institutions had to send international students to high schools to be prepared until they met university academic writing demands because universities did not have any courses for preparing L2 students for preparing to meet the right language proficiency levels needed to function at US universities.

In the U.S., writing received greater attention after a large number of students enrollment in the US universities in the 1960s. This meant that not only teaching reading and speaking skills were important as they were needed for working during the industrialization, but teaching a language required also writing as international students could function in American universities. During this period, postsecondary institutions could no longer ignore the difficulties L2 writers faced as the number of international students increased 4 times more in 1950 compared to 1940 and all freshman students had to take first year composition courses. Specialists had to design courses for L2 writers that were considered as remedial courses in some universities while other institutions credited these courses. To solve the challenges L2 writers encounter, both "composition teachers" and "ESL teachers" attended the meeting organized by Conference on College Composition and Communication (CCCC) established in 1949 as a forum for specialists in the field of composition. Specialists and educators discussed the materials that needed to be used for teaching L2 writing instruction, and ESL specialists suggested using materials designed by Michigan English Language Institute (ELI). Michigan ELI was the first language teaching institution founded to teach English to Spanish language speakers, and the institute also provided courses for teaching ESL. Second language writing issues were considered both by composition and ESL teachers at the conference.

After Michigan ELI and other institutions started preparing ESL teaching specialists, second language teachers argued that second language learners should be taught only by ESL specialists. Also, in 1966, Teachers of English to Speakers of Other Languages (TESOL), a new organization was established to serve L2 specialists' needs. As a result, composition studies acquired two components: “L1” and “L2 writing” that lead to the establishment of second language writing as a separate discipline that falls under TESOL.

== Perspectives and theories ==
Second language writing development has been investigated from many different perspectives. Manchón's edited book on L2 Writing Development: Multiple Perspectives provides an insight in which perspective second language writing development can be investigated. Her edited books includes studies on L2 writing development from dynamic systems theory, goal theory, genre-based systemic functional linguistics, and rhetorical genre theory.

Second language writing development has been most extensively investigated by traditional cross-sectional methodologies such as pre-test post-test designs.

However, in the early 2000s a novel angle has emerged called dynamical systems theory approach on second language development. Studies adopting the DST perspective explore interactions between different constructs such as lexicon, syntax, and accuracy by using moving correlations. The degree of variability in the constructs is usually explored by min-max graphs, data resampling and Monte Carlo Analysis. Among the researchers who have adopted this new angle are Verspoor, de Bot, and Lowie. These researchers used a time-series data to investigate development in second language writing.

== Symposium on Second Language Writing ==
The Symposium on Second Language Writing, which began in 1998 at Purdue University, is an international conference on second language writing. It was a biennial event through 2006, and annual after that. It has been hosted at Purdue University six times, but the 2007 symposium was held in Japan; the 2009 at Arizona State University, the 2010 in Murcia, Spain; the 2011 in Taipei, Taiwan; and the 2013 will be held at Shandong University, Jinan, China.

== At TESOL ==
In June 2005, the TESOL Board added of a new interest section on writing. The Second Language Writing IS; it held its first meeting in Tampa in March 2006, covering topics ranging from "Broadening Perspectives in Second Language Writing" and "Alternative Placement Methods for Second Language Writers" to "Issues in Technologies for L2 Composition Classrooms" and "Crossing Bridges with Second Language Writing Partnerships."

As these suggest, the section provides a forum for researchers and educators at different grade levels and institutional settings to discuss second language writing. Specifically, the section's goals are:

- to increase awareness of the significance of writing in teaching ESL/EFL,
- to encourage and support the teaching of writing to ESOL students at all levels,
- to provide a forum to discuss issues of writing assessment and the placement of second language writers, and
- to disseminate and promote research on second language writing

The section facilitates communication about writing across teaching levels and settings. Recent research on the scope of second language writing scholarship suggests that most of the field's nationally (within the U.S.) and internationally circulated scholarship is produced by scholars in post-secondary education at research intensive institutions. Other contexts for writing (Pre-K through 12, two-year colleges, community programs, international K-12 schools, etc.) often have much larger populations of ELL/EFL writers, but scholars, particularly teacher-researchers, in these settings do not often receive support for researching and writing.

Given this, the section provides scholars with the opportunity to initiate more research and scholarship in these underrepresented contexts by supporting new collaborations and partnerships across levels and by providing a forum for discussing shared experiences. The section, like its parent body, TESOL, is distinctive in including all the academic levels and areas.

== Second Language Writing Transfer (L2) Theory ==
Some notable scholars in the field of Second Language (L2) writing transfer include Mark Andrew James and GitaDasBender. First, Depalma and Ringer (2011) define how L2 writing transfer was only defined as individuals reusing previous writing knowledge from one context to another in a second language context. In particular, there are two examples outlined by James (2018b) of when L2 writing transfer may occur. First, it possibly occurs when students are taught a certain organizational structure to follow in one ESL writing classroom and possibly utilize this structure in another one. Second, it can "occur" when teachers teach L2 writers certain steps on writing and revising essays and L2 writers may incorporate these "steps" on future assignments. However, DePalma and Ringer (2011) advocate for the concept of adaptive transfer where L2 writers might "consciously" readapt or reuse previous writing knowledge from one context to another giving L2 writers more "agency" over their writing. Grujicic-Alatriste (2013) critiques their piece because she states that people have to possibly factor in the overall classroom experience to determine how much adaptive transfer has occurred. James (2018b) notes that previous L2 experiences could affect L2 writing in newer situations as he highlights that helping students understand the similarities between writing contexts could help the transfer process. However, he mentions that transfer does not always occur and instructors have to reflect on lessons that give L2 writers the motivation to engage in L2 writing transfer. Thus, the goal of L2 writing education is to encourage positive transfer even though transfer between languages are often portrayed in a negative context and may discourage it (James, 2018a).

James (2009) discusses how ESL writing classrooms in universities play a major role, consciously or unconsciously, in helping students learn things that they also use in other classes. Cui (2019) argues that further studies need to be conducted on how "first-year L2 writers in US universities transfer writing knowledge". DasBender (2016) discusses how these L2 first-year writers face a lot of "different expectations" that they are expected to meet because "different colleges and writing classrooms are going to handle the needs of these writers". This is reinforced by James (2009) who states that there is a significant difference in the types of writing that are produced in ESL writing courses compared to other kinds of writing in other academic disciplines in US universities.

Thus, Gita DasBender mentions that the previous experiences of three writers may impede their efforts to conform to first-year writing standards even those geared towards ESL writers. For example, she notes that a good number of L2 writers have to deal with another language like English to communicate and are not as familiar with analysis. Therefore, she indicates that teachers can review concepts that are difficult for L2 writers including organization, audience awareness, and genres in order to help them master and learn more about their writing. Furthermore, she notes that teachers can give these writers reflection activities to help these students ponder what previous writing experiences they have through to help build metacognition because she is unsure if students would even attempt to do so without motivation from teachers.

== At the Conference on College Composition and Communication ==
Second language writing scholars also participate in a Special Interest Group on the field at the Conference on College Composition and Communication (CCCC). In addition, the organization has a Committee on Second Language Writing to bridge work between CCCC and TESOL to involve more scholars in the field's discussions.

Much recent attention focuses on the potential of computer-mediated communication (CMC) to foster desire and opportunity to write.

In addition, attention has been focused on the practical application of teaching Second Language writing not only in academia but in the field.

== See also ==
These researchers have contributed to the field of second language writing research.

- Scott Crossley
- Alister Cumming
- Ken Hyland
- Rosa Manchón
- Paul Kei Matsuda
- Lourdes Ortega
- Charlene Polio
- Neomy Storch
- Marjolijn Verspoor
