= European Second Language Association =

Scholarly society based in Colchester, UK

- Abbreviation: EuroSLA
- Formation: 1989; 37 years ago
- Founded at: Colchester, United Kingdom
- Legal status: Association
- Region served: Europe
- Fields: Second language and second language acquisition
- Official language: English
- President: Roger Gilabert
- Main organ: Journal of the European Second Language Association
- Website: www.eurosla.org

The European Second Language Association (EuroSLA) is a learned society for researchers with an interest in second language and second language acquisition.

== History ==
EuroSLA was established in Colchester, the United Kingdom, in 1989 and the first president of the society was Vivian Cook. The 2024 president is Roger Gilabert (University of Barcelona).

== Publications ==
The Journal of the European Second Language Association (ISSN 2399-9101) is published after the annual conferences. The EUROSLA Yearbook has been published annually by the John Benjamins Publishing Company since 2000.

== Grants and awards ==
=== Distinguished scholar award ===
The association presents a yearly "best article prize" and a career award "for outstanding scholarship and contribution to the field". Previous winners of the latter award have been:

- 2014 - Vivian Cook
- 2015 - David Singleton
- 2016 - Carmen Muñoz
- 2017 - Michael Sharwood Smith
- 2018 - Jan Hulstijn
- 2019 - Marianne Gullberg
- 2021 - Florence Myles and Rosamond Mitchell
- 2022 - Jean-Marc Dewaele
- 2023 - Paul Meara

== See also ==
- European Association for the Teaching of Academic Writing
