= Brian Paltridge =

Australian linguist

Brian Paltridge is an Australian linguist who is Professor of Teaching English to Speakers of Other Languages (TESOL) at the University of Sydney. He has published in the areas of teaching English as a second or foreign language, the analysis of discourse, academic writing, the importance of Genre, and the use of English for research purposes.

He served as the editor of the TESOL Quarterly (Wiley) from 2014 – 2017.

== Selected publications ==
- Paltridge, B. (2021). Discourse analysis (pp. 41–44). Springer International Publishing.
- Paltridge, B., & Starfield, S. (Eds.). (2013). The handbook of English for specific purposes (Vol. 592). Boston: Wiley-blackwell.
- Paltridge, B. (2001). Genre and the language learning classroom. University of Michigan Press.
