= Scott Jarvis (linguist) =

American linguist and professor

- Born: 1966 (age 59–60); Arizona, US
- Known for: Second language acquisition; Lexical diversity
- Spouse: Sirpa Jarvis
- Children: 4

Academic background
- Education: Indiana University Bloomington (BA); Indiana University Bloomington (MA, PhD)
- Thesis: The role of L1-based concepts in L2 lexical reference. (1997)
- Academic advisor: Kathleen Bardovi-Harlig

Academic work
- Discipline: Linguist
- Sub-discipline: Second language acquisition
- Institutions: Indiana University Bloomington; Ohio University; University of Utah
- Main interests: Lexical diversity
- Website: Jarvis on the Northern Arizona University website

Scott Jarvis (born 1966) is an American linguist. He is a Professor of Applied Linguistics at Northern Arizona University, United States. His research focuses on second language acquisition more broadly, with a special focus on lexical diversity.

== Career ==
Jarvis obtained his Bachelor of Arts degree in linguistics at Brigham Young University in 1991. He obtained a Master of Arts degree in applied linguistics at Indiana University Bloomington in 1993. In 1997 he was awarded with the Doctor of Philosophy degree in linguistics at Indiana University Bloomington.

Between 2001 and 2002 he was the Chair of the Research Interest Section for the TESOL International Association.

Jarvis was an associate journal editor between 2007 and 2011, a board member and associate executive director between 2011 and 2015 and has been executive editor for Language Learning.

He was the Executive Committee Member for American Association for Applied Linguistics between 2014 and 2016.

== Research ==
Jarvis is noted for his contribution on lexical diversity. He claimed that lexical diversity should viewed as an umbrella term similarly to ecological diversity. According to Jarvis's model, lexical diversity includes variability, volume, evenness, rarity, dispersion and disparity.

== Bibliography ==
=== Books ===
- Scott, J. & Pavlenko, A. (2008). Crosslinguistic influence in language and cognition. New York: Routledge.

=== Articles ===
- Jarvis, S. (2000), Methodological Rigor in the Study of Transfer: Identifying L1 Influence in them Interlanguage Lexicon. Language Learning, 50(2), pages 245-309. doi:
- Jarvis, S., & Odlin, T. (2000). Morphological type, spatial reference, and language transfer. Studies in Second Language Acquisition, 22(4), pages 535-556. doi:
- Pavlenko, A., & Jarvis, S. (2002). Bidirectional Transfer. Applied Linguistics, 23(2), pages 190–214, doi:
- Jarvis, S. (2002). Short texts, best-fitting curves and new measures of lexical diversity. Language Testing, 19(1), pages 57–84. doi:
- McCarthy, P., & Jarvis, S. (2010). MTLD, vocd-D, and HD-D: A validation study of sophisticated approaches to lexical diversity assessment. Behavior Research Methods, 42(2), pages 381-392.

== Personal life ==
Jarvis married Sirpa, originally from Finland, in 1990 and they had four children. Jarvis's native language is English. However, he has learned Finnish, Swedish, Estonian, and German.
