= Ken Hyland =

British linguist

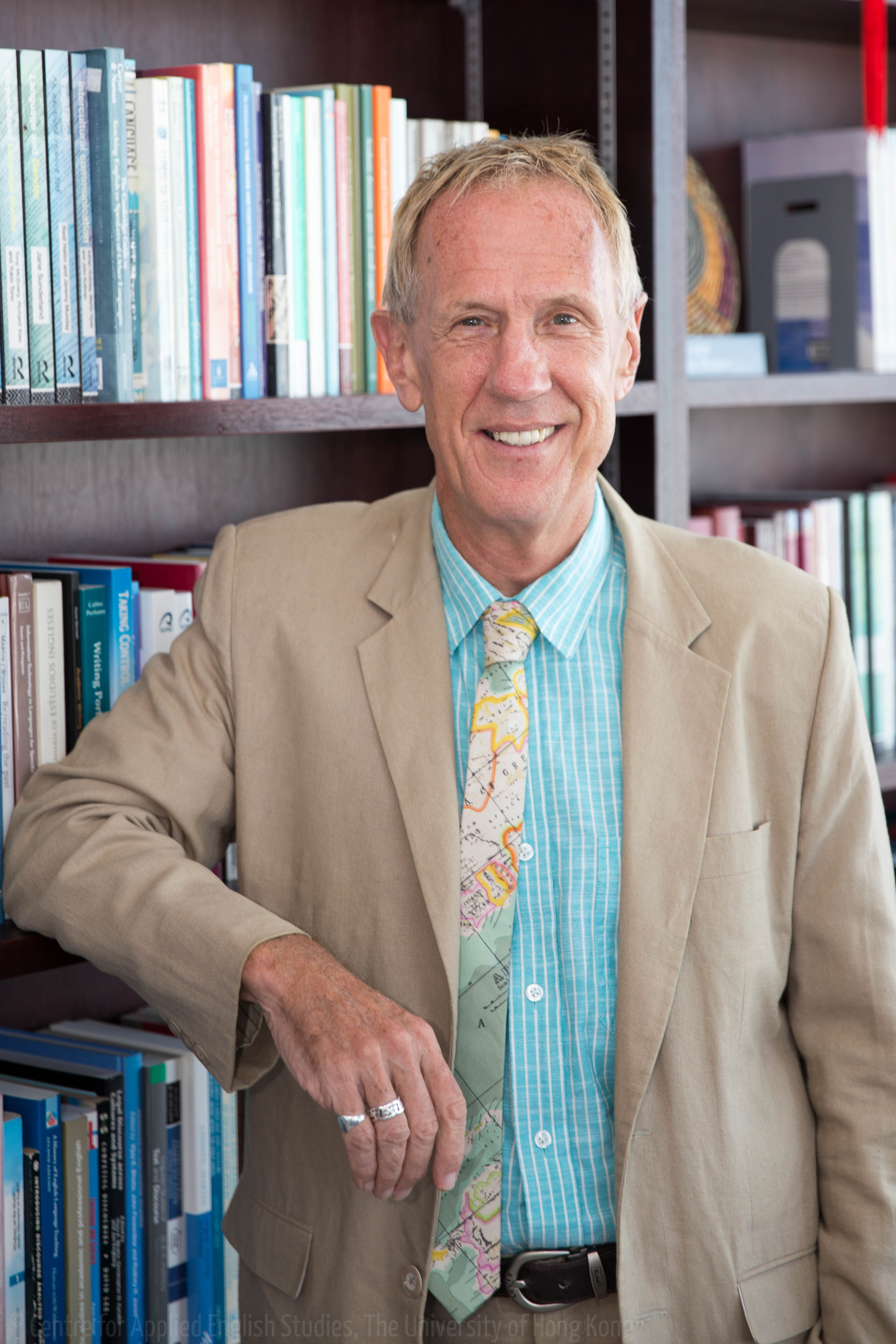
- Born: 19 November 1951 (age 74)
- Education: University of Warwick
- Known for: Second language writing
- Scientific career
- Fields: Second language acquisition; Second language writing
- Workplaces: University of East Anglia
- Thesis: Hedging in scientific research articles
- Website: research-portal.uea.ac.uk/en/persons/ken-hyland

Ken Hyland is a British linguist. He is currently a professor of applied linguistics in education at the University of East Anglia.

Hyland is an applied linguist in the field of academic discourse, second language writing, and English for Academic Purposes, and has published more than 30 books and 320 articles. Google Scholar shows him to be one of the most cited researchers in Applied Linguistics. According to the Stanford/Elsevier analysis of the Scopus database, he has been the world's most influential scholar in language and linguistics from 2021 to 2025 and Research.com ranks Ken as the 116th most influential scholar in Humanities and social sciences globally.

== Career ==
He is founding co-editor of the Journal of English for Academic Purposes and was co-editor of Applied Linguistics.

== Books ==
=== Authored ===
- Hyland, K. (2016) Teaching and Researching Writing. 3rd edition. London: Routledge.
- Hyland, K. (2015) Academic publishing: issues and challenges in the production of knowledge. Oxford: Oxford University Press.
- Hyland, K. (2015). Academic Written English. Shanghai: Shanghai Foreign Language Education Press.
- Hyland, K. (2012). Disciplinary Identities: Individuality and Community in Academic Writing. Cambridge: Cambridge Applied Linguistics.
- Hyland, K. (2009). Teaching and Researching Writing. 2nd edition. London: Longman.
- Hyland, K. (2009). Academic Discourse: English in a Global Context. London: Continuum.
- Hyland, K. (2006). English for Academic Purposes: An Advanced Resource Book. London: Routledge.
- Hyland, K. (2005). Metadiscourse: Exploring Interaction in Writing. London: Continuum.
- Hyland, K. (2004). Genre and Second Language Writing. Ann Arbor: University of Michigan Press.
- Hyland, K. (2004). Disciplinary Discourses: Social Interactions in Academic Writing. Ann Arbor: University of Michigan Press.
- Hyland, K. (2003). Second Language Writing. New York: Cambridge University Press. [Awarded Honorable Mention for the Kenneth W. Mildenberger Prize, Modern Languages Association].
- Hyland, K. (2002). Teaching and Researching Writing. London: Longman.
- Hyland, K. (2000). Disciplinary Discourses: Social Interactions in Academic Writing. London: Longman
- Hyland, K. (1998). Hedging in Scientific Research Articles. Amsterdam: John Benjamins.

=== Edited ===
- Hyland, K. (ed.) (2017). The Essential Hyland. London: Bloomsbury Press.
- Wong, L. & Hyland, K. (eds.) (2017). Faces of English Education: Students, Teachers and Pedagogy. London: Routledge.
- Hyland, K. (ed.) (2017). Academic Writing: critical readings vol 1–2. London: Bloomsbury Press.
- Hyland, K & Shaw, P. (eds.) (2016). The Routledge Handbook of English for Academic Purposes. London: Routledge.
- Hyland, K. & Wong, L. (Eds.) Innovation and Change in Language Education. London: Routledge.
- Hyland, K. (Ed.) (2013). Discourse Studies Reader. London: Bloomsbury Publishing.
- Hyland, K. & Sancho Guinda, C. (Eds.) (2013). Stance and Voice in Written Academic Genres. London: Palgrave Macmillan.
- Hyland, K., Chau M. H. & Handford, M. (Eds.) (2012). Corpus Applications in Applied Linguistics. London: Continuum.
- Hyland, K & Paltridge, B. (Eds.) (2011). Continuum Companion to Discourse Analysis. London: Continuum.
- Hyland, K. & Diani, G. (Eds.) (2009). Academic Evaluation: Review Genres in University Setting. London: Palgrave-MacMillan.
- Hyland, K. & Bondi, M. (Eds.) (2006). Academic Discourse Across Disciplines. Frankfort: Peter Lang.
- Hyland, K. & Hyland, F. (Eds.) (2006). Feedback in Second Language Writing: Contexts and Issues. New York: Cambridge University Press.
- Candlin, C. & Hyland, K. (Eds.) (1999). Writing: Texts, Processes and Practice. London: Longman.
- Berry, R., Asker, B., Hyland, K. & Lam, M. (Eds.) (1999). Language Analysis, Description and Pedagogy. Hong Kong: Hong Kong University of Science and Technology Press.

== See also ==
- Second language writing
- Paul Kei Matsuda
- Rosa Manchón
