= Lourdes Ortega =

Professor of applied linguistics

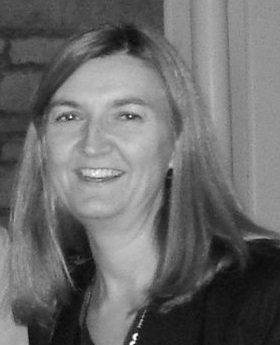
- Born: 4 June 1962 (age 64); Cádiz, Spain
- Education: University of Cádiz
- Known for: Second language writing
- Scientific career
- Fields: Second language acquisition; Syntactic complexity; Second language writing
- Workplaces: Georgia State University; Northern Arizona University; University of Hawaii at Manoa; Georgetown University
- Website: Ortega on the website of Georgetown University

Lourdes Ortega (born 1962) is a Spanish-born American linguist. She is currently a professor of applied linguistics at Georgetown University. Her research focuses on second language acquisition and second language writing. She is noted for her work on second language acquisition and for recommending that syntactic complexity needs to be measured multidimensionally.

== Career ==
Ortega received her Master of Arts in English as a second language in 1995 and her Doctor of Philosophy in Second language acquisition in 2000 from the University of Hawaii at Manoa. She taught applied linguistics in graduate programs at Georgia State University between 2000 and 2002, Northern Arizona University between 2002 and 2004, University of Hawaii at Manoa between 2004 and 2012, and Georgetown University since 2012.

She is the Currents in Language Learning Series Editor & Associate General Editor of the Language Learning: A Journal of Research in Language Studies, a peer-reviewed academic journal.

== Research ==
Ortega is noted in the field of second language acquisition for her paper entitled "Towards an Organic Approach to Investigating CAF in Instructed SLA: The Case of Complexity", published in Applied Linguistics in which she claimed along with John Norris that syntactic complexity need to be measured multidimensionally.

== Awards ==
- 2000: TESOL Distinguished research
- 2001: The Modern Language Journal /ACTFL Paul Pimsleur

== Bibliography ==
=== Books ===
- Understanding Second Language Acquisition. (2009)

=== Articles ===
- "Effectiveness of L2 instruction: A research synthesis and quantitative meta‐analysis." (2000)
- "The role of implicit negative feedback in SLA: Models and recasts in Japanese and Spanish." (1998)
- "Planning and focus on form in L2 oral performance." (1999)
- "Syntactic complexity measures and their relationship to L2 proficiency: A research synthesis of college‐level L2 writing." (2003)
- "Towards an organic approach to investigating CAF in instructed SLA: The case of complexity." (2009)
