= Lexical diversity =

Lexical diversity is one aspect of 'lexical richness' and refers to the ratio of different unique word stems (types) to the total number of words (tokens). The term is used in applied linguistics and is quantitatively calculated using numerous different measures including Type-Token Ratio (TTR), vocd, and the measure of textual lexical diversity (MTLD).

A common problem with lexical diversity measures, especially TTR, is that text samples containing a large number of tokens give lower values for TTR since it is often necessary for the writer or speaker to re-use many words. One consequence of this is that it is often assumed that lexical diversity can only be used to compare texts of the same length. Yet, many measures of lexical diversity attempt to account for sensitivity to text length. Surveys of such measures are provided by Baayen and more recently Bestgen.

== Definitions ==
In a 2013 article Scott Jarvis proposed that lexical diversity, similar to diversity in ecology, is a perceptual phenomenon. Lexical redundancy is a positive counterpart of lexical diversity in the same way as lexical variability is the mirror image of repetition. According to Jarvis's model, lexical diversity includes variability, volume, evenness, rarity, dispersion and disparity.

According to Jarvis, the six properties of lexical diversity should be measured by the following indices.

Property	Measure
Variability	Measure of Textual Lexical Diversity (MTLD)
Volume	Total number of words in the text
Evenness	Standard deviation of tokens per type
Rarity	Mean BNC rank
Dispersion	Mean distance between tokens of type
Disparity	Mean number of words per sense or Latent Semantic Analysis
