= ITL International Journal of Applied Linguistics =

- Discipline: Linguistics
- Language: English

Publication details
- Publisher: Department of Linguistics, KU Leuven; Department of Applied Linguistics, Vlekho; Department of Applied Linguistics, Lessius Hogeschool
- Frequency: Biannual
- Open access: Hybrid

Standard abbreviations
- ISO 4: ITL Int. J. Appl. Linguist.

Indexing
- ISSN: 0019-0829 (print); 1783-1490 (web)

Links
- Journal homepage

ITL International Journal of Applied Linguistics is an peer-reviewed academic journal of linguistics. It is published by the Department of Linguistics (KU Leuven), the Department of Applied Linguistics (Vlekho), and the Department of Applied Linguistics (Lessius Hogeschool) and is hosted online by Peeters Publishers. The journal has merged with Interface, Journal of Applied Linguistics, published by the Department of Applied Linguistics (VLEKHO).

'ITL' refers to Instituut voor Toegepaste Linguïstiek, the center of applied linguistics at KU Leuven, where the journal was founded.

== Abstracting and indexing ==
The journal is indexed and abstracted in the following bibliographic databases:

- DIALNET
- IBZ Online
- Linguistic Bibliography
- MLA - Modern Language Association Database
- Periodicals Index Online

The journal is also evaluated in CARHUS Plus+, ERIH PLUS, and SCImago.

== See also ==
- List of applied linguistics journals
