= Lester L. Faigley =

American literary scholar (1947–2020)

Lester L. Faigley (1947-2020) was an American literary scholar and the Robert Adger Law and Thos H. Law Centennial Professor at University of Texas at Austin, where he was founding chair of the Department of Rhetoric and Writing.

== Education ==
- University of Washington, Ph.D. (1976), English.
- Miami (Ohio) University, M.A. (1972), English, linguistics.
- North Carolina State University, B.A. (1969).
