= Critical language awareness =

In linguistics, critical language awareness (CLA) refers to an understanding of social, political, and ideological aspects of language, linguistic variation, and discourse. It functions as a pedagogical application of critical discourse analysis (CDA), which is a research approach that regards language as a social practice. More specifically, critical language awareness is a consideration of how features of language such as words, grammar, and discourse choices reproduce, reinforce, or challenge certain ideologies and struggles for power and dominance.

Regarding linguistic variation, linguist Norman Fairclough argued that it is insufficient to teach students to use "appropriate" language without considering why that language is preferred and who makes that decision (as well as the implications for speakers who do not use "appropriate language").

CLA generally includes consideration of how a person may be marginalized by speaking a particular way, especially if that way of speaking serves as an index of their race, ethnicity, religion, social status, etc.

Because power is reproduced through language, CLA is "a prerequisite for effective democratic citizenship, and should therefore be seen as an entitlement for citizens, especially children developing towards citizenship in the educational system".

== Frameworks ==
In 2022, Shawna Shapiro published the book Cultivating Critical Language Awareness in the Writing Classroom. It included chapters describing four pathways teachers can use to implement critical language awareness in the classroom: sociolinguistics, critical academic literacies, media literacy and discourse analysis, and "communicating-across-difference".

Others have argued for the implementation of critical language awareness in other fields such as business and professional communications.

== Applications ==
Critical language awareness has been applied to educating students in South Africa how language was used to maintain and perpetuate the apartheid state.

It has also been applied to present small groups of children with tasks which encourage a focus on the similarities and differences between languages.

== See also ==
- Critical applied linguistics
- Critical discourse analysis
- Critical pedagogy
- Political correctness
