= Writing Systems Research =

- Discipline: Linguistics
- Language: English

Publication details
- Publisher: Taylor & Francis

Standard abbreviations
- ISO 4: Writ. Syst. Res.

Indexing
- ISSN: 1758-6801 (print); 1758-681X (web)

Writing Systems Research was a peer-reviewed academic journal, founded in 2009, relating to the analysis, use and acquisition of writing systems. The editors in chief were Bene Bassetti (University of Warwick) and Jyotsna Vaid (Texas A & M University). It is indexed and abstracted by SCOPUS.

The journal ceased publication in 2019.

== See also ==
- List of applied linguistics journals
