= TESOL Journal =

- Discipline: Teaching English as a second or foreign language, applied linguistics
- Language: English
- Edited by: Bedrettin Yazan, Kristen Lindahl

Publication details
- History: 1992–2003; 2010–present
- Publisher: Wiley on behalf of TESOL International Association (United States)
- Frequency: Quarterly
- Open access: Hybrid
- Impact factor: 2.0 (2025)

Standard abbreviations
- ISO 4: TESOL J.

Indexing
- CODEN: TEJOEO
- ISSN: 1056-7941 (print); 1949-3533 (web)
- LCCN: 92642327
- OCLC no.: 782103034

Links
- Journal homepage; Online access; Online archive

TESOL Journal is a quarterly peer-reviewed, practitioner-oriented academic journal covering research, theory, and practice in teaching English as a second or foreign language. It is published by Wiley on behalf of TESOL International Association. The journal provides a forum for second- and foreign-language educators to examine how research and theorising can inform teaching practices, and how practice can contribute to research and theory. The current co-editors are Bedrettin Yazan and Kristen Lindahl.

== History ==
An earlier series of TESOL Journal began in 1992 and continued through 2003. The title was subsequently relaunched as a new series in 2010, with the volume numbering restarting at volume 1. The ISSN record identifies the current publication as a "new series" and records both the earlier and current runs.

Margo DelliCarpini was appointed to edit the relaunched journal and served as editor from 2009 to 2015. She was succeeded by Joy Egbert of Washington State University, who served from 2016 to 2018. Youngjoo Yi and Peter Sayer of Ohio State University became co-editors in 2019 and served a three-year term through 2021. Kristen Lindahl and Bedrettin Yazan were appointed co-editors in 2022.

== Scope ==
TESOL Journal describes itself as a practitioner-oriented journal based on current theory and research in the field of TESOL. It publishes work intended to connect research and theorising with classroom practice and to encourage dialogue between researchers, teacher educators, and teachers working in a range of second- and foreign-language contexts. TESOL International Association describes the journal as a refereed electronic publication focused on English-language teaching and learning.

== Abstracting and indexing ==
The journal is abstracted and indexed in Emerging Sources Citation Index, ERIC, Scopus, and Web of Science, as well as ArticleFirst, Education Full Text, Education Index/Abstracts, IBR and IBZ, and OmniFile Full Text Mega Edition.

According to Wiley, the journal has a 2025 impact factor of 2.0 and a CiteScore of 3.5.

== Open access ==
The journal operates under a hybrid open access model. Authors may elect to make individual articles immediately open access following payment of an article processing charge or through an institutional or funder agreement with Wiley.

== See also ==
- TESOL Quarterly
- TESOL International Association
- List of applied linguistics journals
