= Reading and Writing =

Academic journal

Reading and Writing is an academic journal of the processes, acquisition, and loss of reading and writing skills. It is published by Springer Science+Business Media.

The editor is R. Malatesha Joshi (Texas A&M University).
