= Rosa Manchón =

Spanish linguist

Rosa M. Manchón
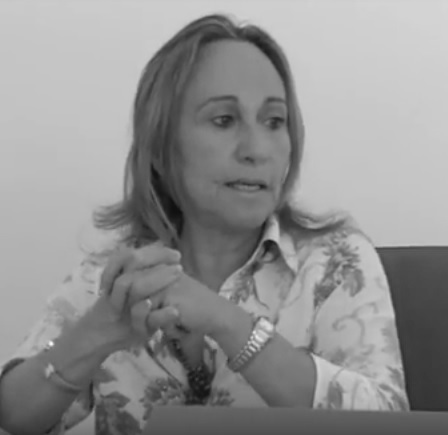
- Born: 6 July 1957 (age 67); Murcia, Spain
- Known for: Second language writing
- Scientific career
- Fields: Second language acquisition; Second language writing
- Institutions: University of Murcia
- Website: Manchón on the website of the University of Murcia

Rosa María Manchón Ruiz (born 1957) is a Spanish linguist. She is currently a professor of applied linguistics at the University of Murcia, Spain. Her research focuses on second language acquisition and second language writing. She was the editor of the Journal of Second Language Writing between 2008 and 2014.

== Career ==
Manchón started teaching at the University of Murcia in 1995.

From 2011 and 2014, she was a member of the Executive Board of the International Association of Applied Linguistics. From 2008 and 2014, she was the co-editor of the Journal of Second Language Writing.

On 24 March 2010, she was interviewed along with Ilona Leki on the goals and the future of the Journal of Second Language Writing.

On 26 July 2012, she presented at the Campus Mare Nostrum of the University of Murcia: Curso de verano entitled Escribir ciencia en inglés.

She is an associate editor of The Modern Language Journal, a peer-reviewed academic journal.

== Research ==
Manchón has published extensively in prestigious journals such as Journal of Second Language Writing, The Modern Language Journal, Language Learning, Annual Review of Applied Linguistics, International Review of Applied Linguistics in Language Teaching.

Manchón is noted for her theoretical contributions to the study of second language writing. She distinguished the writing-to-learn (WL) and the learning-to-write (LW) dimensions. Her research interests have focused on the cognitive dimension of the acquisition and use of second languages, with special emphasis on the psycholinguistic dimension of textual production.

She has edited several books on second language writing: Writing in Foreign Language Contexts: Learning, Teaching and Research, Learning-to-Write and Writing-to-Learn in an Additional Language, L2 Writing Development: Multiple Perspectives and Writing and Language Learning: Advancing Research Agendas.

== Bibliography ==
=== Books ===
- Writing in foreign language contexts: Learning, teaching, and research. (2009)
- Learning-to-write and writing-to-learn in an additional language. (2011)
- L2 Writing Development: Multiple Perspectives. (2012)
- Task-Based Language Learning – Insights from and for L2 Writing. (2014)
- Handbook of Second and Foreign Language Writing. (2016)
- Writing and Language Learning: Advancing Research Agendas. (2020)

=== Articles ===
- "The use of restructuring strategies in EFL writing: A study of Spanish learners of English as a foreign language." (2008)
- "The foreign language writer's strategic behaviour in the allocation of time to writing processes." (2008)
- "Generating text in native and foreign language writing: A temporal analysis of problemsolving formulation processes." (2006)
- "An approximation to the study of backtracking in L2 writing." (2000)
- "On the temporal nature of planning in L1 and L2 composing." (2007)
