= Coh-Metrix =

Coh-Metrix is a computational tool that produces indices of the linguistic and discourse representations of a text. Developed by Arthur C. Graesser and Danielle S. McNamara, Coh-Metrix analyzes texts on many different features.

== Measurements ==
Coh-Metrix can be used in many different ways to investigate the cohesion of the explicit text and the coherence of the mental representation of the text. "Our definition of cohesion consists of characteristics of the explicit text that play some role in helping the reader mentally connect ideas in the text" (Graesser, McNamara, & Louwerse, 2003). The definition of coherence is the subject of much debate. Theoretically, the coherence of a text is defined by the interaction between linguistic representations and knowledge representations. While coherence can be defined as characteristics of the text (i.e., aspects of cohesion) that are likely to contribute to the coherence of the mental representation, Coh-Metrix measurements provide indices of these cohesion characteristics.

According to an empirical study, the Coh-Metrix L2 Reading Index performs significantly better than traditional readability formulas.

== See also ==
- L2 Syntactic Complexity Analyzer
