= Canadian Modern Language Review =

- Discipline: Modern Language
- Language: English
- Edited by: Murray Munro and Danièle Moore

Publication details
- History: 1967-present
- Publisher: University of Toronto Press (Canada)
- Frequency: Quarterly

Standard abbreviations
- ISO 4: Can. Mod. Lang. Rev.

Indexing
- ISSN: 0008-4506 (print); 1710-1131 (web)

Links
- Journal homepage

The Canadian Modern Language Review is a quarterly peer-reviewed academic journal focusing on second language learning and teaching. CMLR publishes articles in English and French and is published by the University of Toronto Press.

== Abstracting and indexing ==
The journal is abstracted and indexed in:

- Academic Search Alumni Edition
- Academic Search Complete
- Academic Search Elite
- Academic Search Premier
- Book Review Digest Plus
- Canadian Almanac & Directory
- CBCA Education
- Canadian Periodical Index
- Canadian Reference Centre
- China Education Publications Import & Export Corporation (CEPIEC)
- Communication & Mass Media Complete
- Communication & Mass Media Index
- Communication Source
- CrossRef
- CSA Sociological Abstracts
- Cultures, Langues, Textes: La revue de sommaires
- Education Abstracts
- Education Full Text
- Education Research Complete
- Education Source
- EJS EBSCO Electronic Journals Service
- Google Scholar
- International Bibliography of the Social Sciences (IBSS)
- Language Teaching
- Microsoft Academic Search
- MLA International Bibliography
- OmniFile Full Text Mega
- Project MUSE
- ScienceDirect Navigator
- Scopus
- Social Sciences Citation Index
- Ulrich's Periodicals Directory
