= Journal of Child Language =

- Discipline: Linguistics
- Language: English
- Edited by: Elma Blom, Melanie Soderstrom

Publication details
- History: 1974–present
- Publisher: Cambridge University Press
- Frequency: Bimonthly
- Open access: Yes
- License: Creative Commons
- Impact factor: 1.7 (2023)

Standard abbreviations
- ISO 4: J. Child Lang.

Indexing
- ISSN: 0305-0009 (print); 1469-7602 (web)
- LCCN: 76649848
- OCLC no.: 485704851

Links
- Journal homepage; Online access; Online archive

The Journal of Child Language is a bimonthly peer-reviewed academic journal covering all aspects of the study of language behavior in children, the principles which underlie it, and the theories which may account for it. This includes various aspects of linguistics such as phonology, phonetics, morphology, syntax, vocabulary, semantics, pragmatics, and sociolinguistics. Its editors-in-chief are Elma Blom (Utrecht University) and Melanie Soderstrom (University of Manitoba). It was established in 1974 with David Crystal (Bangor University) as its founding editor. The journal is published by Cambridge University Press and is fully open access. It is the official journal of the International Association for the Study of Child Language.

== Abstracting and indexing ==
The journal is abstracted and indexed in:

- Arts and Humanities Citation Index
- EBSCO databases
- Linguistics and Language Behavior Abstracts
- MLA International Bibliography
- Scopus
- Social Sciences Citation Index

According to the Journal Citation Reports, the journal has a 2023 impact factor of 1.7.

== See also ==
- List of applied linguistics journals
