= Goal theory =

Psychological theory about goals

Goal theory is the label used in educational psychology to discuss research into motivation to learn. Goals of learning are thought to be a key factor influencing the level of a student's intrinsic motivation.

== Goal Setting Theory ==
Goal setting theory has to do with the relationship between goal determination (goal setting) and behavior, with learners' selection of goals, the degree of motivation for fulfilling the goals, and the likelihood of the fulfillment of the goals being in the spotlight. This theory is composed of two main components as follows: the individuality and difficulty of the goal, and the effort one needs to fulfill the objectives. Goal-setting theory refers to a direct relationship between written goals and performance.

== Main axes ==
Research in goal theory has identified the following dichotomies:

=== Task/ego involvement ===
A student is described as task-involved when they are interested in the task for its own qualities. This is associated with higher intrinsic motivation. Task-involved students are less threatened by failure because their own ego is not tied up in the success of the task.

A student who is ego-involved will be seeking to perform the task to boost their own ego, for the praise that completing the task might attract, or because completing the task confirms their own self-concept (e.g. clever, strong, funny etc...). Ego-involved students can become very anxious or discouraged in the face of failure, because such failure challenges their self-concept.

=== Approach/avoidance goals ===
Not all goals are directed towards approaching a desirable outcome (e.g., demonstrating competence). Goals can also be directed towards avoiding an undesirable outcome (e.g., avoiding the demonstration of incompetence to others).

It is thought that approach goals contribute positively to motivation whereas avoidance goals do not.

=== Performance goals ===
A performance goal is a goal focused on gaining favorable judgement or avoiding unfavorable judgements by others. Performance goals focuses on ensuring that one's performance is noticeably superior to others. This motivation to outperform others is what enables the person to strive for more achievement in and outside of school and work as well.

==== In the classroom ====
Performance goals can heavily impact adolescents in the classroom. This deep desire to out-do those around oneself can alter classroom ideologies in each student; some for the better and sometimes for the worse. For the betterment of performance in class, performance goals lead students to place a greater importance on GPA and class rankings. This in turn, leads to better academic performance. Along with a focus on grades, students see exams as a competition that also allows them to enhance their performance.

There is a significant advantage in academic performance in students who possess performance goals in the classroom. It also generates a healthy form of competition between peers enhancing peer relationships and grades among all of those particular students.

Performance goals lead to a strong sense of commitment that can appear in the classroom and also outside of the classroom as well. The student exemplifies a strong relationship with the goal of doing better than others, and this leads to a longterm commitment to achieving that goal. On the other hand, there can be extensive downsides that can come along with focusing entirely on out-performing others. Students can feel accomplished when they receive a better grade on the test than everyone else, but that can simply be linked to memorization and not full comprehension. There comes a conflict when the student attempts to fully comprehend new information on top of trying to focus on doing better than those around them. The student may not be able to handle the combined pressure of learning and constant competition; one of those two variables must alter. Other concerns involve stress on the student to try to keep up with those around them, tension in the classroom as a student struggles with asking questions for fear of seeming incapable to others, and anxiety and frustration with all of those variables on top of each other.

== Other developments ==
Other researchers have adopted a more complex perspective on goals, arguing that there are many different kinds of goals individuals can have in achievement settings. For instance, Ford and Nichols (1987) extended this point of view into within-person goals and person-environment goals, which lays equal significance on learners per se and learning environment.

Nevertheless, all the theories are devoted to studying the types of goals as well as their impact on multiple facets of learning. In other words, research that takes goals as a dependent variable remains scarce. Such a strategy to take goals for granted could be defended on the grounds that one cannot deal with all aspects of so complex an issue and that the theorists possibly feel the question of how goals originate was not relevant to the models they developed.

On the other hand, young children are frequently ignored within this area, based on the assumption that they might not have a clear pattern of setting a goal or they even do not own a goal when starting a task. Klahr argued that although there are large adult-child differences in overall problem-solving performance, even preschoolers have rudimentary forms of strategies such as means-ends analysis that rely on the use of goals. Thus, expanding the subject selection range and focusing on the process of goal-setting are expected to be the two main tasks in future research direction.
