= Novitas-ROYAL =

Novitas – ROYAL
- Discipline: Linguistics, applied linguistics, education
- Language: English

Publication details
- History: 2007-present
- Publisher: Children's Research Center, Ankara, Turkey and Novitas-ROYAL
- Frequency: Biannually
- Open access: Yes

Standard abbreviations
- ISO 4: Novitas-ROYAL

Indexing
- ISSN: 1307-4733
- OCLC no.: 173190653

Links
- Journal homepage; Current issue; Abstracting & Indexing

Novitas-ROYAL (Research on Youth and Language) is a biannual open access peer-reviewed academic journal covering research and critical discussion about all aspects of language, linguistics, applied linguistics, and learning and teaching of foreign languages. The journal is in English, with each article including a Turkish abstract. The journal was founded by Prof. Dr. Arda Arikan in 2007, with Prof. Dr. Olcay Sert (Mälardalen University) serving as editor-in-chief in the following years. It is sponsored by the Children's Research Center (Ankara, Turkey). At present, the editor-in-chief is Assoc. Prof. Dr. Mehmet Galip Zorba (Akdeniz University, Turkey). The journal is indexed in/ by SCOPUS (Q1).

== Abstracting and indexing ==
Novitas-ROYAL is abstracted and indexed by:

- MLA International Bibliography
- Linguistics Abstracts
- Linguistics and Language Behaviour Abstracts
- EBSCO (Education Research Complete)
- Scopus
- TRDİZİN
