= TESOL International Association =

Professional association and educational organization

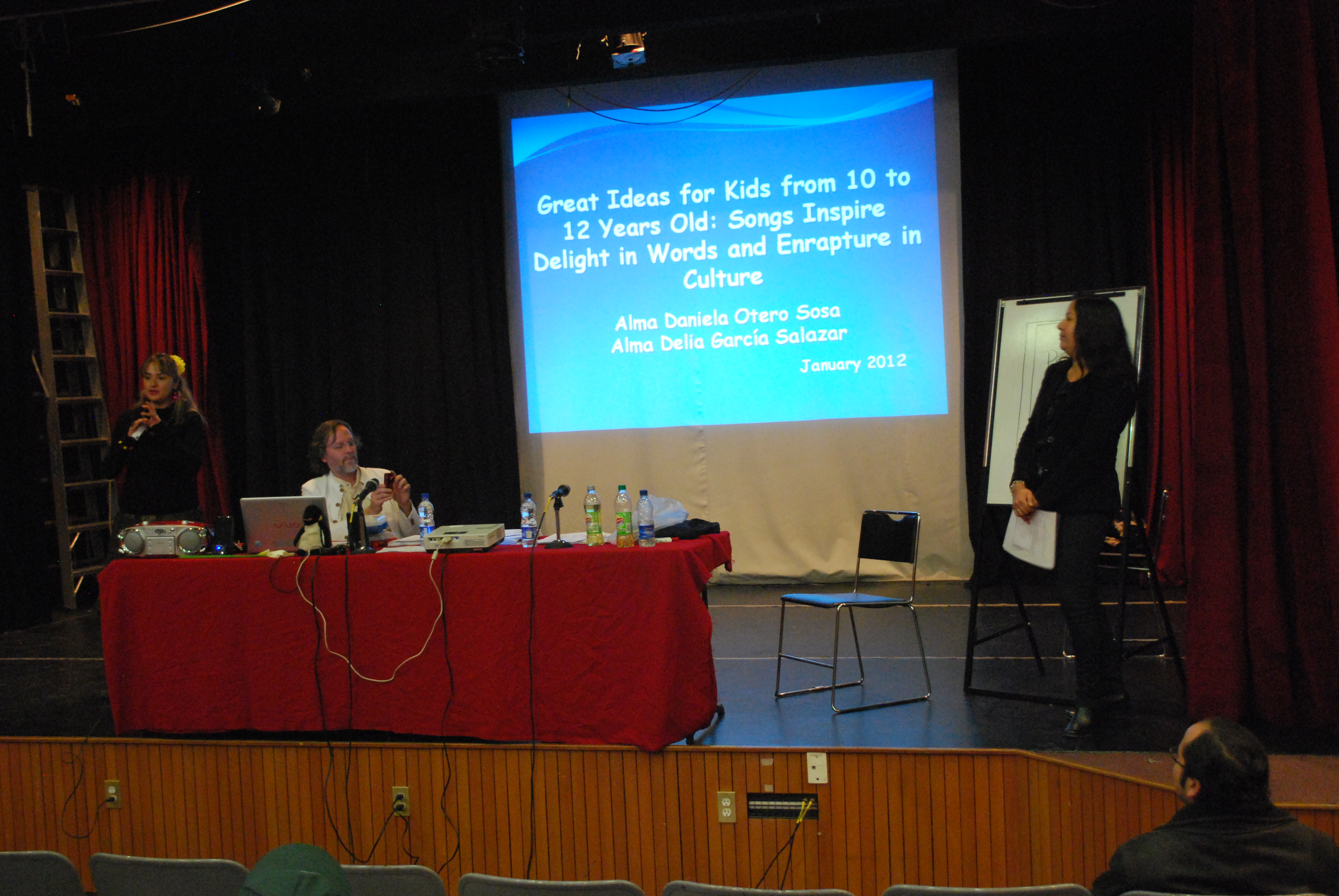
- Presentation at an Academic Saturday event with the MexTESOL chapter in Mexico City
- Formation: 1966
- Headquarters: Alexandria, Virginia, United States
- Website: www.tesol.org
- Formerly called: Teachers of English to Speakers of Other Languages

TESOL International Association, formerly Teachers of English to Speakers of Other Languages, is the largest professional organization for teachers of English as a second or foreign language. It was founded in 1966 and is based in Alexandria, Virginia, in the United States. As of 2018, it had 10,113 members worldwide and was affiliated with 109 language education organizations, just over half of which were based outside the United States. TESOL's total number of members, including those of affiliate organizations, was around 44,000.

TESOL publishes two peer-reviewed academic journals – the TESOL Quarterly and the TESOL Journal. During the summer, the organization holds professional development seminars called "TESOL Academies" across the United States. It also hosts an annual convention.
