= Language Learning (journal) =

- Discipline: Language, linguistics
- Language: English
- Edited by: Lourdes Ortega

Publication details
- History: 1948–present
- Publisher: Wiley-Blackwell on behalf of the Language Learning Research Club at the University of Michigan (United States)
- Frequency: Quarterly
- Impact factor: 1.218 (2011)

Standard abbreviations
- ISO 4: Lang. Learn.

Indexing
- ISSN: 0023-8333 (print); 1467-9922 (web)
- LCCN: 52044910
- OCLC no.: 224471193

Links
- Journal homepage; Online access; Online archive

Language Learning: A Journal of Research in Language Studies is a peer-reviewed academic journal published quarterly by Wiley-Blackwell on behalf of the Language Learning Research Club at the University of Michigan. Scott Jarvis of Northern Arizona University serves as its editor in chief and Lourdes Ortega as its general editor. Previously, Nick C. Ellis of the University of Michigan served as its editor-in-chief and as general editor of the journal.

Language Learning covers research on "fundamental theoretical issues in language learning such as child, second, and foreign language acquisition, language education, bilingualism, literacy, language representation in mind and brain, culture, cognition, pragmatics, and intergroup relations". The journal has two annual supplements, the Best of Language Learning Series and the Language Learning Monograph Series. It is also published in association with a biennial monograph, the Language Learning-Max Planck Institute Cognitive Neurosciences Series.

According to the Journal Citation Reports, the journal has a 2011 impact factor of 1.218, ranking it 26th out of 161 journals in the category "Linguistics" and 42nd out of 203 journals in the category "Education & Educational Research".

== Editorial board ==
- General Editor: Nick C. Ellis
- Journal Editor in Chief: Scott Jarvis
- Journal Co-Editor: Naoko Taguchi
- Associate Journal Editor: Irina Elgort
- Associate Journal Editor: Aline Godfroid
- Associate Journal Editor: Daniel R. Isbell
- Associate Journal Editor: Aine Ito
- Associate Journal Editor: Akira Murakami
- Associate Journal Editor: Charlie Nagle
- Language Learning Cognitive Neuroscience Series Editors: Kara Morgan-Short and Janet van Hell
- Executive Director: Eve C. Zyzik
- Associate Executive Director: Nicholas Henriksen

== See also ==
- List of applied linguistics journals
