= TESOL Quarterly =

- Discipline: Language
- Language: English
- Edited by: Jim McKinley; Sihan Zhou

Publication details
- History: 1967-present
- Publisher: Wiley-Blackwell on behalf of TESOL International Association
- Frequency: Quarterly
- Impact factor: 5.1 (2025)

Standard abbreviations
- ISO 4: TESOL Q.

Indexing
- ISSN: 0039-8322 (print); 1545-7249 (web)
- LCCN: 81641752
- OCLC no.: 781542508

Links
- Journal homepage; Online access; Online archive

TESOL Quarterly is a quarterly peer-reviewed academic journal published by Wiley-Blackwell on behalf of TESOL International Association. It covers English language teaching and learning, standard English as a second dialect, including articles on the psychology and sociology of language learning and teaching, professional preparation, curriculum development, and testing and evaluation. The Editor-in-Chief is Jim McKinley (University College London), and the Senior Associate Editor is Sihan Zhou (The Chinese University of Hong Kong). TESOL also publishes TESOL Journal.

According to the Journal Citation Reports, the journal had a 2025 impact factor of 5.1, ranking it 16th out of 312 journals in the category "Linguistics" and 46th out of 762 journals in the category "Education".

== History ==
At the April 1963 annual conference of the National Association for Foreign Student Affairs (NAFSA), now stands for Association of International Educators, there was a suggestion about a small conference of representatives from various kinds of ESOL programs. The pilot meeting was held in D.C. on September 12, 1963. There were representatives from NAFSA, Center for Applied Linguistics (CAL), the National Council of Teachers of English (NCTE), the Modern Language Association (MLA), the Speech Association of America (SAA), the Bureau of Indian Affairs, the state educational systems of California, Michigan, Florida, Arizona, New Mexico, the city of New York, and Canada. They decided that a national convention on the teaching of English to speakers of other languages should be held in Arizona, May 8–9, 1964. They also decided that there was a need for a professional journal associated with the conference. The first conference took place with 700 participants. At this point, TESOL organization was called The National Advisory Council on Teaching of English as a Foreign Language (NACTEFL). An ad hoc committee representing professional organizations, state educational systems, and individuals concerned with the teaching of English to speakers of other languages met on January 30, 1965. They prepared a brief for the meeting and came up with a questionnaire to enable any and all members of the Teaching English to Speakers of Other Languages, Inc. (TESOL) was established in 1966. Thus, TESOL became its own separate organization. At the third annual meeting, they also made the first steps for TESOL Quarterly and they appointed their first editor, Betty Wallace Robinett from Ball State University, Indiana.

Volume 1, Issue 1 of the Quarterly was published in March 1967. In the editorial of the first issue, the emphasis is put on practical matters. Moreover, even at its initiation, TESOL had global goals. It was concerned with English as a Second Language, as well as English as a Foreign Language. The first issue raised three concerns for the field; there is a high demand for ESL or EFL overseas, there are more than 100,000 foreign students in the U.S. and Canada and there is a need to help raise the language competence of these students, and lastly, there are several millions of residents in the U.S. whose first language is not English and teachers need support.

The first issue also listed goals for the journal and the organization. Brief version of the goals is as follows;

- a central office, with a TESOL library
- development of the journal as the central organ of the profession
- a newsletter relevant to the TESOL field
- a national register of competent personnel
- a publishing program, in addition to the journal and the newsletter. which will offer pamphlets, fliers, reprints, recordings, etc.
- a speaking and consulting program for workshops and professional development
- an annual convention
- planned program of national and regional meetings
- organization cooperation with other organizations

Also, there were several goals about what TESOL could achieve nationally;

- Appointment of TESL specialist in a high position of the U.S. Office of Education
- Appointment of a TESL specialist as a consultant in every state where there is a TESOL program
- Recognition of the problem by school administration about the needs of ESL students
- Establishments of national guidelines for certification and preparation of teachers
- Increased research in the pedagogy of ESL

Some of the topics from the first issue were; teaching the sounds of English, the place of dictations in the ESL classroom, teaching reading and composition, the need for materials for teaching to Southwestern Indian speakers, teaching English to Spanish-English speakers, current trends of teaching English in France, curriculum trends in TESOL, programs administered by the U.S. department of Education.

=== Editor history ===
Previous Editors of TESOL Quarterly
Tenure	Editor(s)	Affiliation(s) during editorship
1967–1972	Betty Wallace Robinett	Ball State University; later University of Minnesota
1973	Maurice Imhoof	Indiana University
1974–1978	Ruth Crymes	University of Hawaiʻi at Mānoa
1978–May 1983	Jacquelyn Schachter	University of Hawaiʻi at Mānoa; later University of Southern California
During Schachter's tenure	William E. Rutherford (acting editor)	University of Southern California
June 1983–1985	Barry P. Taylor	University of Pennsylvania
1985–1989	Stephen J. Gaies	University of Northern Iowa
1990–1993	Sandra Silberstein	University of Washington
1994–1999	Sandra Lee McKay	San Francisco State University
2000–2004	Carol A. Chapelle	Iowa State University
2005–2009	Suresh Canagarajah	Baruch College, City University of New York; later Pennsylvania State University
2010–2013	Diane Belcher and Alan Hirvela	Georgia State University (Belcher); Ohio State University (Hirvela)
2014–2017	Ahmar Mahboob and Brian Paltridge	University of Sydney
2018–June 2026	Charlene Polio and Peter De Costa	Michigan State University

== 60th Anniversary ==
In their final year as co-editors, Charlene Polio and Peter De Costa, both at Michigan State University, completed their tenure with the 60th annivesary special issue "TESOL Quarterly Turns 60: Another Major Milestone for the Journal and Our Field". The issue (volume 60, issue 2) consisted of an editorial introduction and eighteen invited articles by prominent scholars in the field.

== 50th Anniversary ==
On the 50th anniversary, completing the tenure for Co-Editors Brian Patlridge and Ahmar Mahboob, both at the University of Sydney, TESOL Quarterly titled their annual report (2016) "Reflecting Forward". In this report, it is stated that, based on the 2015-2016 data, TESOL has more than 11,000 members in 160 countries. In addition, it started to provide grants and awards to its members. Each award provides up to US$2500 for applicants who are currently working on research or would like to start research projects that are aligned with the TESOL Research Agenda. TESOL received 67 grant request submissions in 2016.

In terms of publishing, articles from expanding circle countries increased dramatically around the 1990s. Also, studies in EFL countries increased in the past 20 years and most of these articles came from Asia Pacific contexts. In this report, Canagarajah summarizes the changes and the emerging trends as follows:

- from product to process and practice
- from cognitive to social and ecological
- from pre-packacged methods to situated pedagogies and language socialization
- from studying controlled classrooms and experimental settings to everyday contexts and ecologies
- from the homogeneous to variation and inclusive plurality
- from knowledge or skills to identities, beliefs, and ideologies
- from objective to personal and reflexive
- from the generalized and global to specific and local

== See also ==
- List of applied linguistics journals
