= Journal of Second Language Writing =

- Discipline: Linguistics, education
- Language: English
- Edited by: Amanda Kibler, Todd Ruecker

Publication details
- History: 1992-present
- Publisher: Elsevier
- Frequency: Quarterly
- Impact factor: 3.538 (2020)

Standard abbreviations
- ISO 4: J. Second Lang. Writ.

Indexing
- ISSN: 1873-1422
- LCCN: 92643958
- OCLC no.: 45343364

Links
- Journal homepage; Online access

The Journal of Second Language Writing is a peer-reviewed academic journal in the fields of linguistics and language education. Its scope encompasses all aspects of second and foreign language writing, including writing instruction and assessment. It was established in 1992 at Ablex Publishing and is currently published quarterly by Elsevier. The current editors-in-chief are Youjin Kim (Georgia State University) and Stephen Doolan (Texas A&M University, Corpus Christi). The founding editors were Ilona Leki (University of Tennessee) and Tony Silva (Purdue University).

According to Journal Citation Reports, the journal had a 2024 impact factor of 5, ranking it 13th out of 194 journals in the category "Linguistics".

== Abstracting and indexing ==
The journal is indexed in the following services:

- Arts & Humanities Search
- Communication Abstracts
- Current Contents
- Educational Research Abstracts Online
- Education Resources Information Center
- CSA Linguistics and Language Behavior Abstracts
- Language Teaching
- Linguistics Abstracts
- Scopus
- Social Sciences Citation Index

== See also ==
- List of applied linguistics journals
