= ILF =

ILF may refer to:

- Ilford Airport, the IATA code for the airport in Canada
- Indiana Library Federation, professional association for librarians
- Industry Liaison Forum of the International AIDS Society
- Inferior longitudinal fasciculus, a nerve bundle in the brain
- Innocent Lives Foundation, an organization dedicated to unmasking anonymous online child predators to help bring them to justice.
- International Lacrosse Federation
- International Landworkers' Federation, a former global union federation
- Interactive Life Forms, the parent company of Fleshlight brand products.
- International Lifeboat Federation now the International Maritime Rescue Federation
- Ilya Ilf, a Russian writer.
- Institute for Law and Finance, graduate law school of the Johann Wolfgang Goethe University Frankfurt am Main, Germany
- International Literacy Foundation, an international charity founded in 2010 with the aim of tackling illiteracy
- Institut Lean France, non-profit organization that aim to promote lean thinking, member of the LGN (Lean Global Network)
- International Limb Fittings, a recurve bow limb attachment system.
- Islamabad Literature Festival, an annual international literary festival held in Islamabad, Pakistan
