= Literacy =

Ability to read and write

Adult literacy rates from Our World in Data, 2025.

Literacy is traditionally the ability to read and write. Since the mid-twentieth century, the term is also used more broadly to encompass identifying, understanding, interpreting, creating, communicating, and using written information in ways that enable individuals to participate effectively in society and achieve goals.

The spread of literacy has been closely linked to the invention and spread of writing systems, the expansion of education, and technological change. Literacy rates have increased substantially worldwide since the mid-twentieth century, although significant disparities remain between countries, regions, and demographic groups, particularly with respect to gender and access to education.

In 2022, the World Economic Forum estimated the global literacy rate at 87%, which was a substantial increase from 200 years ago, where it was at 12% in 1820. The UNESCO Institute of Statistics in 2025, noted that from 1975 to 2024, adult literacy rose from 65% to 88%, and global youth literacy for ages 18–24 increased from 75% to 93%. Despite these advances in global literacy over the last century, UNESCO reported that about 739 million adults and young people lacked basic literacy skills, and nearly 40% of children worldwide do not reach minimum reading proficiency.

Because literacy is fundamental to education, economic participation, and civil life, it has been the subject of extensive interdisciplinary research, and its definition and measurement remain subjects of scholarly and policy debate.

Related concepts include functional literacy and multiliteracies, while specialized forms include digital literacy, media literacy, and health literacy.

== Definition ==
World illiteracy halved between 1970 and 2015.

Literate and illiterate world population over time, Our World in Data, 2022.

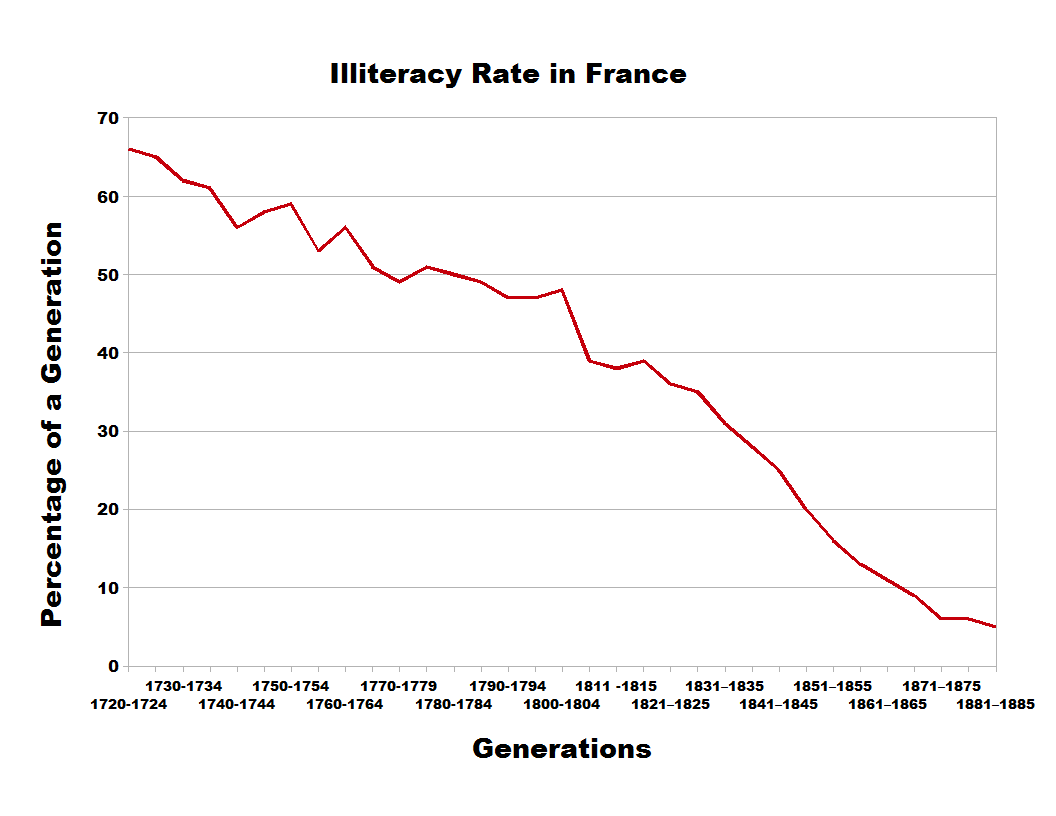
Illiteracy rate in France in the 18th and 19th centuries

The range of definitions of literacy used by NGOs, think tanks, and advocacy groups since the 1990s suggests that this shift in understanding from "discrete skill" to "social practice" is both ongoing and uneven. Some definitions remain fairly closely aligned with the traditional "ability to read and write" connotation, whereas others take a broader view:

- The 2003 National Assessment of Adult Literacy (USA) included "quantitative literacy" (numeracy) in its treatment of literacy. It defined literacy as "the ability to use printed and written information to function in society, to achieve one's goals, and to develop one's knowledge and potential." It included three types of adult literacy: prose (e.g., a newspaper article), documents (e.g., a bus schedule), and quantitative literacy (e.g., the use of arithmetic operations in a product advertisement).
- In 2015, the United Nations Statistics Division defined the youth literacy rate as "the percentage of the population aged 15–24 years who can both read and write with understanding a short simple statement on everyday life."
- In 2016, the European Literacy Policy Network defined literacy as "the ability to read and write [...] in all media (print or electronic), including digital literacy."
- In 2018, UNESCO included "printed and written materials" and "varying contexts" in its definition of literacy, i.e., "the ability to identify, understand, interpret, create, communicate and compute, using printed and written materials associated with varying contexts."
- In 2019, the Organisation for Economic Co-operation and Development (OECD), in its Programme for the International Assessment of Adult Competencies (PIAAC) adult skills surveys, included "written texts" in its definition of literacy, i.e., "the ability to understand, evaluate, use and engage with written texts in order to participate in society, achieve one's goals, and develop one's knowledge and potential." Also, it treats numeracy and problem solving using technology as separate considerations.
- In 2021, Education Scotland and the National Literacy Trust in the UK included oral communication skills (listening and speaking) under the umbrella of literacy.
- As of 2021, the International Literacy Association uses "the ability to identify, understand, interpret, create, compute, and communicate using visual, audible, and digital materials across disciplines and in any context."
- The expression "reading literacy" is used by the Progress in International Reading Literacy Study (PIRLS), which has monitored international trends in reading achievement at the fourth grade level since 2001.
- Instead of defining "literacy", Sarah Gudschinsky described a person who is literate: "That person is literate who, in a language he speaks, can read with understanding anything he would have understood if it had been spoken to him; and can write so that it can be read, anything he can say".
- Other organizations might include numeracy skills and technology skills separately but alongside literacy skills; still others emphasize the increasing involvement of computers and other digital technologies in communication that necessitates additional skills (e.g., interfacing with web browsers and word processing programs, organizing and altering the configuration of files, etc.).
- Some researchers define literacy as "particular ways of thinking about and doing reading and writing" with the purpose of understanding or expressing thoughts or ideas in written form in some specific context of use. In this view, humans in literate societies have sets of practices for producing and consuming writing, and they also have beliefs about these practices. Reading, in this view, is always reading something for some purpose; writing is always writing something for someone for some purpose. Beliefs about reading and writing and their value for society and for the individual always influence the ways literacy is taught, learned, and practiced.

=== Multiliteracy ===
The concept of multiliteracies has gained currency, particularly in English Language Arts curricula, on the grounds that reading "is interactive and informative, and occurs in ever-increasingly technological settings where information is part of spatial, audio, and visual patterns (Rhodes & Robnolt, 2009)". Objections have been raised that this concept downplays the importance of reading instruction that focuses on "alphabetic representations". However, these are not mutually exclusive, as children can become proficient in word-reading while engaging with multiliteracies.

=== Other uses of the word "literacy" ===
Word reading is fundamental for multiple forms of communication. Beginning in the 1940s, the term literacy has often been used to mean having knowledge or skill in a particular field, such as:

- Computer literacy – Skill in using computers and digital technology
- Scientific literacy – Ability to understand science
- Statistical literacy – Ability to understand and reason with statistics and data
- Critical literacy – Ability to find embedded discrimination in media
- Disaster literacy – Proposed model for the ability to understand and use life-saving information, including the ability to respond and recover from disasters effectively
- Ecological literacy – Ability to understand natural systems and their interactions
- Financial literacy – Ability to make informed choices about money
- Health literacy – Ability to understand healthcare information
- Linguistic literacy – Ability to read, write, understand, and speak any type of language
- Media literacy – Ability to navigate media
- Political literacy – Abilities needed for an effective electorate
- Social literacy – Literacy gained through social interactions
- Mathematical literacy, also called numeracy – Ability to apply numerical concepts
- Visual literacy – Ability to interpret information in images, e.g., body language, pictures, maps, and video
- Musical literacy – Refers to culturally determined systems of knowledge in music and to musical abilities.

Classicist Eric Havelock developed a continuum for a culture's literacy, from pre-literate, through craft-literate, recitation-literate and script-literate to type-literate.

=== Functional illiteracy ===
Functional illiteracy (Note: The condition of not being able to read or write well enough to do things that are needed for living and working in society - Cambridge Dictionary) relates to adults and has been defined in different ways:

- Inability to use reading, writing, and calculation skills for their own and their community's development.
- Inability to read well enough to manage daily living and employment tasks that require reading skills beyond a basic level.
- Inability to understand complex texts despite adequate schooling, language skills, elementary reading skills, age, and IQ.

Functional illiteracy is distinguished from primary illiteracy (i.e., the inability to read and write a short, simple statement concerning one's own everyday life) and learning difficulties (e.g., dyslexia). These categories have been contested—as has the concept of "illiteracy" itself—for being predicated on narrow assumptions, primarily derived from school-based contexts, about what counts as reading and writing (e.g., comprehending and following instructions).

== Historical overview ==
=== Origins ===
Script is thought to have developed independently at least five times in human history: in Mesopotamia, Egypt, the Indus civilization, lowland Mesoamerica, and China.

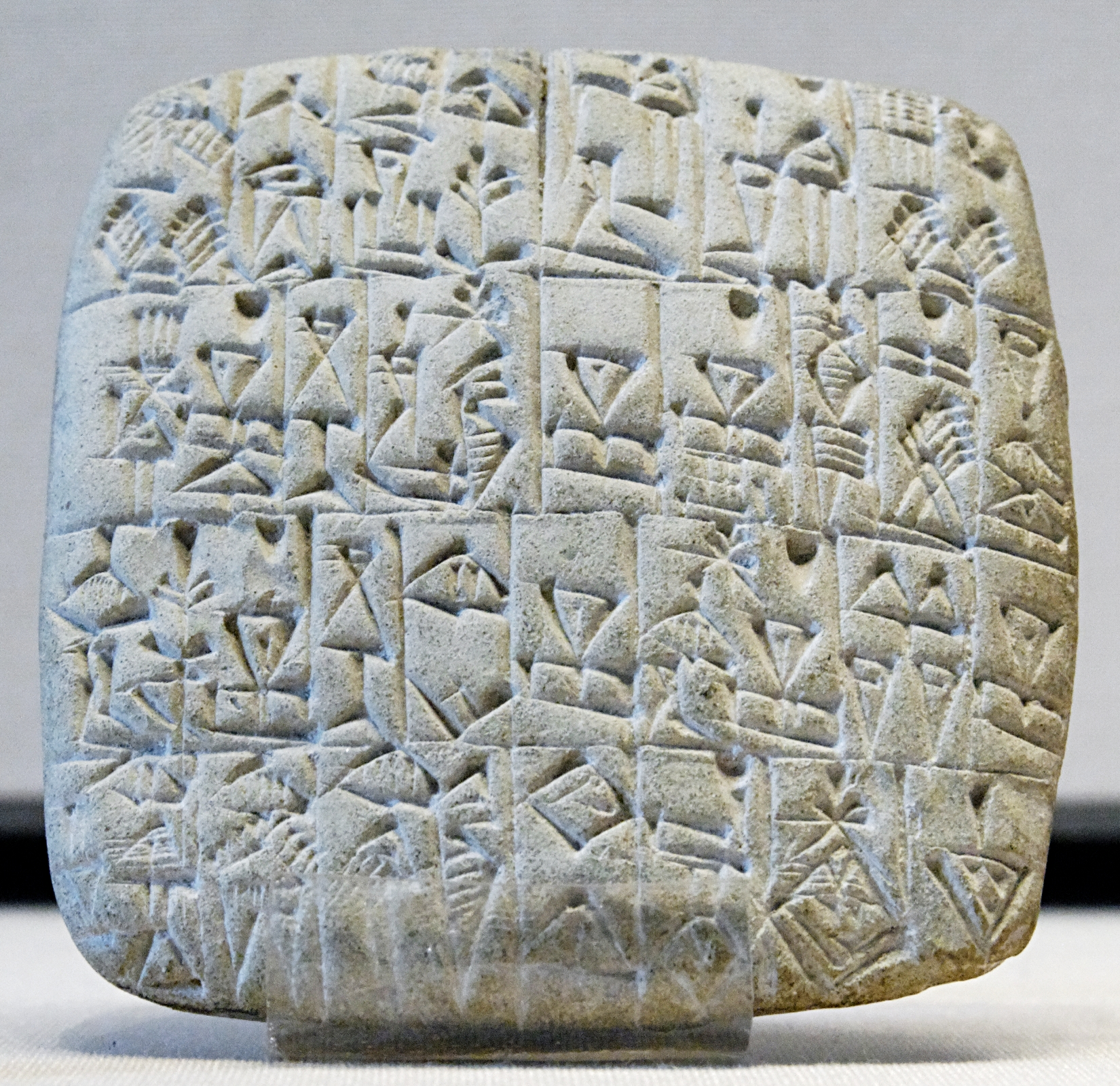
Bill of sale of a male slave and a building in Shuruppak, Sumerian tablet, c. 2600 BCE

Between 3500 BCE and 3000 BCE, in southern Mesopotamia, the ancient Sumerians invented writing. During this era, literacy was "a largely functional matter, propelled by the need to manage the new quantities of information and the new type of governance created by trade and large scale production". Early writing systems first emerged as a recording system in which people used tokens with impressed markings to manage trade and agricultural production. The token system served as a precursor to early cuneiform writing once people began recording information on clay tablets. Proto-Cuneiform texts exhibit not only numerical signs but also ideograms depicting objects being counted. Though the traditional view had been that cuneiform literacy was restricted to a class of scribes, assyriologists including Claus Wilcke and Dominique Charpin have argued that functional literacy was somewhat widespread by the Old Babylonian period. Nonetheless, professional scribes became central to law, finances, accounting, government, administration, medicine, magic, divination, literature, and prayers.

Egyptian hieroglyphs emerged between 3300 BCE and 3100 BCE; the iconography emphasized power among royals and other elites. The Egyptian hieroglyphic writing system was the first notation system to have phonetic values; these symbols are called phonograms.

Writing in lowland Mesoamerica was first used by the Olmec and Zapotec civilizations in 900–400 BCE. These civilizations used glyphic writing and bar-and-dot numerical notation systems for purposes related to royal iconography and calendar systems.

The earliest written notations in China date back to the Shang dynasty in 1200 BCE. These systematic notations, inscribed on bones, recorded sacrifices made, tributes received, and animals hunted, which were activities of the elite. These oracle-bone inscriptions were the early ancestors of modern Chinese script and contained logosyllabic script and numerals. By the time of the consolidation of the Chinese Empire during the Qin and Han dynasties (c. 200 BCE), written documents were central to the formation and policing of a hierarchical bureaucratic governance structure reinforced through law. Within this legal order, written records kept track of and controlled citizen movements, created records of misdeeds, and documented the actions and judgments of government officials.

Indus script is largely pictorial and has not yet been deciphered; as such, it is unknown whether it includes abstract signs. It is thought that they wrote from right to left and that the script is logographic. Because it has not been deciphered, linguists disagree on whether it is a complete and independent writing system; however, it is generally thought to be an independent writing system that emerged in the Harappa culture.

Existing evidence suggests that most early acts of literacy were, in some areas (such as Egypt), closely tied to power and chiefly used for management practices, and probably less than 1% of the population was literate, as it was confined to a very small group. Scholarship by others, such as Dominique Charpin and a project from the European Union, however, suggest that this was not the case in all ancient societies: both Charpin and the EU's emerging scholarship suggest that writing and literacy were far more widespread in Mesopotamia than scholars have previously thought.

=== Alphabetic writing ===
According to social anthropologist Jack Goody, there are two interpretations regarding the origin of the alphabet. Many classical scholars, such as historian Ignace Gelb, credit the Ancient Greeks for creating the first alphabetic system (c. 750 BCE) that used distinctive signs for consonants and vowels. Goody contests:

The importance of Greek culture of the subsequent history of Western Europe has led to an over-emphasis, by classicists and others, on the addition of specific vowel signs to the set of consonantal ones that had been developed earlier in Western Asia.

Many scholars argue that the ancient Semitic-speaking peoples of northern Canaan invented the consonantal alphabet as early as 1500 BCE. Much of this theory's development is credited to English archeologist Flinders Petrie, who, in 1905, came across a series of Canaanite inscriptions in the turquoise mines of Serabit el-Khadem. Ten years later, English Egyptologist Alan Gardiner reasoned that these letters contain an alphabet as well as references to the Canaanite goddess Asherah. In 1948, William F. Albright deciphered the text using new evidence, including a series of inscriptions from Ugarit. Discovered in 1929 by French archaeologist Claude F. A. Schaeffer, some of these inscriptions were mythological texts (written in an early Canaanite dialect) that consisted of a 30-letter cuneiform consonantal alphabet.

Another significant discovery was made in 1953 when three arrowheads were uncovered, each containing identical Canaanite inscriptions from 12th century BCE. According to Frank Moore Cross, these inscriptions consisted of alphabetic signs that originated during the transitional development from pictographic script to a linear alphabet. Moreover, he asserts, "These inscriptions also provided clues to extend the decipherment of earlier and later alphabetic texts".

The Canaanite script's consonantal system inspired alphabetical developments in later systems. During the Late Bronze Age, successor alphabets appeared throughout the Mediterranean region and were used in Phoenician, Hebrew, and Aramaic.

According to Goody, these cuneiform scripts may have influenced the development of the Greek alphabet several centuries later. Historically, the Greeks contended that their writing system was modeled after the Phoenicians. However, many Semitic scholars now believe that Ancient Greek is more consistent with an early form of Canaanite that was used c. 1100 BCE. While the earliest Greek inscriptions are dated circa 8th century BCE, epigraphical comparisons to Proto-Canaanite suggest that the Greeks may have adopted the consonantal alphabet as early as 1100 BCE and later "added in five characters to represent vowels".

Phoenician, which is considered to contain the first linear alphabet, rapidly spread to Mediterranean port cities in northern Canaan. Some archeologists believe that Phoenician influenced the Hebrew and Aramaic alphabets, as these languages evolved during the same time period, share similar features, and are commonly categorized into the same language group.

When the early Israelites settled in the Canaanite highlands between 1200 and 1000 BCE, they utilized a variation of the early Phoenician alphabet, now referred to by scholars as Paleo-Hebrew. This script was prominent in the Mediterranean region throughout the First Temple period. Following the Neo-Babylonian conquest and the subsequent exile of the Jewish population to Babylon in the 6th century BCE, the Jewish community increasingly adopted Imperial Aramaic, the lingua franca of the region. Over the following centuries, this influenced the development of the 'Square' script (Ktav Ashuri), which gradually replaced the older Paleo-Hebrew script for most religious and secular Jewish writing. While Paleo-Hebrew eventually faded from general Jewish use, it continued to be employed for centuries by the Samaritans and appears on coinage from the Hasmonean period and the Great Revolt against Rome.

The Aramaic alphabet also emerged sometime between 1200 and 1000 BCE. Although early examples are scarce, archeologists have uncovered a wide range of later Aramaic texts, written as early as the seventh century BCE. In the Near East, it was common to record events on clay using the cuneiform script; however, writing Aramaic on leather parchments became common during the Neo-Assyrian empire. With the rise of the Persians in the 5th century BCE, Achaemenid rulers adopted Aramaic as the "diplomatic language".

Darius the Great standardized Aramaic, which became the Imperial Aramaic script. This Imperial Aramaic alphabet rapidly spread: west, to the Kingdom of Nabataea, then to the Sinai and Arabian peninsulas, eventually making its way to Africa; and east, where it later influenced the development of the Brahmi script in India. Over the next few centuries, Imperial Aramaic script in Persia evolved into Pahlavi, "as well as for a range of alphabets used by early Turkish and Mongol tribes in Siberia, Mongolia and Turkestan".

The Aramaic language declined with the spread of Islam, which was accompanied by the spread of Arabic.

=== Antiquity ===
Historian William V. Harris in his studies estimates the level of literacy in classical Greece, which he argued was high for its time between 5% and 10%, with the lowest rates amongst women, enslaved populations and those in the countryside. Catherine Hezser explains that majority of the population in rural and urban Roman Judea could not read or write literary texts, whether they were written in Hebrew, Aramaic, Greek or Latin. Meir Bar-Ilan in his analysis places the figure at 3%, and it was concentrated among the scribes, wealthy urbanites, and priests in major cities like Jerusalem, while Michael Owen Wise places it at around 7%.

While Harris' low estimates and other minimalist models remain influential, (Note: See for example: Harris, 1991.) they have been challenged in specific contexts. Brian J. Wright argues functional literacy was more widespread in early Christian contexts. Contributors to Anne Kolb's Literacy in Ancient Everyday Life, used epigraphic evidence and texts from Rome, China, India, Egypt and Persia to argue for its practical integration in daily lives. They reasoned that literacy existed on a broader spectrum of functional skills, rather than a strict binary condition.

As Roman governance transitioned from an oral political culture, to a record-driven apparatus, elites relied more on secretarial labour. Anthony DiRenzo highlights Marcus Tullius Tiro, a former slave and secretary of Cicero, as a case of how specialized scribes enabled Roman administrative and record keeping for speeches, trials and correspondences. Florence Dupont writes that:

"For the Romans grew up in a civilization based on the book and the register, and no one, either free man or slave, could afford to be illiterate unless they were mere tenders of herds in some far-flung corner of Apulia. The written word was all around them, in both public and private life: laws, calendars, regulations at shrines and funeral epitaphs were engraved in stone or bronze. The republic amassed huge archives of reports on every aspect of public life."

In the late fourth century, the Desert Father Pachomius would expect the literacy of a candidate for admission to his monasteries: (Note: Pachomius, Rule 139.)

They shall give him twenty Psalms or two of the Apostles' epistles or some other part of Scripture. And if he is illiterate he shall go at the first, third and sixth hours to someone who can teach and has been appointed for him. He shall stand before him and learn very studiously and with all gratitude. The fundamentals of a syllable, the verbs and nouns shall all be written for him and even if he does not want to he shall be compelled to read.

During the 4th and 5th centuries, the Church made efforts to ensure a better clergy, especially the bishops, who were expected to have a classical education—the hallmark of a socially acceptable person in higher society. Even after the remnants of the Western Roman Empire fell in the 470s, literacy continued to be a distinguishing mark of the elite, as communication skills were still important in political and church life (bishops were largely drawn from the senatorial class) in a new cultural synthesis that made "Christianity the Roman religion". However, these skills were less needed in the absence of a large imperial administrative apparatus whose middle and top echelons were dominated by the elite. (Note: This connection is pursued in Alan K. Bowman and Greg Woolf, eds., Literacy and Power in the Ancient World, (Cambridge) 1994.) During the Dark Ages, the highest percentage of literacy was found among the clergy and monks, as they made up much of the staff needed to administer the states of western Europe.

In the desert regions of southern Syria, Jordan and northern Arabia, an abundance of graffiti rock inscriptions written in Safaitic, Hismaic, and other North Arabian scripts dates from roughly the 1st centuries BCE and 4th century CE. Epigrapher Michael C. A. Macdonald argues that these graffiti demonstrate a high degree of widespread informal literacy among nomadic pastoralists, who learned simple alphabetic scripts to carve names, genealogies and personal observations while livestock keeping. However, Macdonald distinguishes this informal writing from an institutionalized "literate society", noting that the culture of ancient Arabian nomads remained oral, without written laws, state administration or literature.

=== Medieval and early modern eras ===
Estimates of the rates and definitions of the forms of literacy in the European Medieval period vary and are controversial: historian Elaine Treharne writes of "a complex era of strategic literacy, generic fluidity, and linguistic competencies beyond our own experiences." Historian Malcolm Parkes contrasts the differing expertise of the professionally literate class, cultivated readers, and pragmatic readers. Historian Mark Hailwood suggests another two types of near-literacy in early modern England, of "abcederian literates" who could spell out words to read, and of people who knew the letters though not words, were particularly common in Southern English rural areas: 50% of husbandmen could either sign their name or provide an initial.

Post-Antiquity illiteracy was made worse by the lack of a suitable writing medium, as when the Western Roman Empire collapsed, the import of papyrus to Europe ceased. Since papyrus perishes easily and does not last well in the wetter European climate, parchment was used, which was expensive and accessible only by the church and the wealthy. Paper was introduced into Europe via Spain in the 11th century and spread north slowly over the next four centuries. Literacy saw a resurgence as a result, and by the 15th century, paper was widespread.

Estimates of literacy rates vary by time, class, location, sex, and reliability: "Unfortunately, there is no statistical information that allows generalizations to be made in terms of numerical proportions or percentages, either for rates of literacy among the medieval population or for annual book production."

However, here are some indicative estimates. Rates are often extrapolated from the number of people who can sign their name on official documents. First, rough estimates by economic historian Robert Allen, based on the urban/rural split of the population:

European adult literacy (%)
Nation	1500	1800
Netherlands	10	68
England	6	53
Belgium	10	49
Germany	6	35
France	7	37
Austria/Hungary	6	21
Poland	6	21
Italy	9	22
Spain	9	20

However:

- In the late 1200s, there were 1,500 notaries in Milan, over 1% of the population, for drawing up contracts.
- "By 1300, 'everyone knew someone who could read', and there were books in every church and every village."
- By 1500, in England, "probably more than half the population could read, though not necessarily also write." Thomas More in 1533 claimed that up to 60% of the population could read English, a figure supported by some studies of London but not by others. One study estimates that in the city of York in 1500, about 25% of upper- and middle-class people were literate. This contrasts with Stevens' estimates of male literacy of 10% by the start of the century (with almost no female literacy), 20% by the end, and 45% by the end of the 1600s.
- In Venice in 1587, 33% of men were estimated as literate.

Inspired by the Enlightenment, Sweden implemented programs in 1723 aimed at making the population fully literate. Other countries implemented similar measures at this time. These included Denmark in 1739, Poland in 1783, and France in 1794/5.

Literacy was well established in early 18th century England, when books geared towards children became far more common. Near the end of the century, as many as 50 were printed every year in major cities around England.

In Edo-period Japan, literacy in the three major cities has been estimated at 70% for men and 40% for females, but 10–20% lower in the countryside.

=== Industrialization ===
In the 19th century, reading became even more common in the United Kingdom. Public notes, broadsides, handbills, catchpennies and printed songs would have been usual street literature before newspapers became common. Other forms of popular reading material included advertising for events, theaters, and goods for sale. In the late 19th century, gas and electric lighting were becoming more common in private homes, replacing candlelight and oil lamps, enabling reading after dark and increasing the appeal of literacy. G H Lewes noted, in reference to Dickens' novel Pickwick Papers that:

even the common people, both in town and country, are equally intense in their admiration. Frequently, have we seen the butcher-boy, with his tray on his shoulder, reading with the greatest avidity the last "Pickwick"; the footman (whose fopperies are so inimitably laid bare), the maidservant, the chimney sweep, all classes, in fact, read "Boz".

From the mid-19th century onward, the Second Industrial Revolution saw technological improvements in paper production. The new distribution networks, enabled by improved roads and rail, resulted in an increased capacity to supply printed material. Social and educational changes increased the demand for reading matter, as rising literacy rates, particularly among the middle and working classes, created a new mass market for printed material. Wider schooling helped increase literacy rates, which in turn helped lower the cost of publication.

Unskilled labor forces were common in Western Europe, and, as British industry improved, more engineers and skilled workers who could handle technical instructions and complex situations were needed. Literacy was essential to be hired. A senior government official told Parliament in 1870:

Upon the speedy provision of elementary education depends our industrial prosperity. It is of no use trying to give technical teaching to our citizens without elementary education; uneducated labourers—and many of our labourers are utterly uneducated—are, for the most part, unskilled labourers, and if we leave our work–folk any longer unskilled, notwithstanding their strong sinews and determined energy, they will become overmatched in the competition of the world.

The skills of reading and writing are not the same. In Spain, the total rate of literacy between 1841 and 1860 was constant at almost 25%: in 1841 most of the literate could read but not write, but by 1860 most could read and write.

=== Modern proliferation (1950 – present) ===
Adult literacy rates have increased at a constant pace since 1950.

Data published by UNESCO shows that the worldwide literacy rate among adults has increased, on average, by 5 percentage points every decade since 1950, from 55.7% in 1950 to 86.2% in 2015. Due to rapid population growth, while the percentage of adults who were illiterate decreased, the actual number of illiterate adults increased from 700 million in 1950 to 878 million in 1990, before starting to decrease and falling to 745 million by 2015. The number of illiterate adults remains higher than in 1950, "despite decades of universal education policies, literacy interventions and the spread of print material and information and communications technology (ICT)".

UNESCO estimates from 2024 show that 739 million people and young adults worldwide still lack basic literacy skills, highlighting ongoing challenges in achieving universal literacy despite past improvements.

=== Regional disparities ===
Available global data indicates significant variations in literacy rates between world regions. North America, Europe, West Asia, and Central Asia have almost achieved full literacy for men and women aged 15 or older. Most countries in East Asia and the Pacific, as well as Latin America and the Caribbean, have adult literacy rates over 90%. In other regions, illiteracy persists at higher rates; as of 2013, the adult literacy rate in South Asia and North Africa was 67.55% and 59.76% in Sub-Saharan Africa.

Literacy has rapidly spread in several regions over the last twenty-five years.

In much of the world, high youth literacy rates suggest that illiteracy will become less common as more educated younger generations replace less educated older ones. However, in sub-Saharan Africa and South Asia, where the vast majority of the world's illiterate youth live, lower school enrollment implies that illiteracy will persist to a greater degree. According to 2013 data, the youth literacy rate (ages 15 to 24) is 84% in South Asia and North Africa and 70% in sub-Saharan Africa.

However, the distinction between literacy and illiteracy is not clear-cut. Given that having a literate person in the household confers many of the benefits of literacy, some recent literature in economics, starting with the work of Kaushik Basu and James Foster, distinguishes between a "proximate illiterate" and an "isolated illiterate". A "proximate illiterate" lives in a household with literate members, while an "isolated illiterate" lives in a household where everyone is illiterate. Isolated illiteracy is more common among older populations in wealthier nations, where people are less likely to live in multigenerational households with potentially literate relatives. A 2018/2019 UNESCO report noted that "conversely, in low and lower middle income countries, isolated illiteracy is concentrated among younger people," along with increased rates among rural populations and women. This evidence indicates that illiteracy is a complex phenomenon with multiple factors impacting rates of illiteracy and the type of illiteracy one may experience.

Literacy has rapidly spread in several regions in the last twenty-five years, and the United Nations's global initiative with Sustainable Development Goal 4 is also gaining momentum.

== Social impact and demographics ==
The traditional concept of literacy widened as a consensus emerged among researchers in composition studies, education research, and anthropological linguistics that it makes little sense to speak of reading or writing outside of a specific context, with linguist James Paul Gee describing it as "simply incoherent." For example, even the extremely early stages of acquiring mastery over symbol shapes take place in a particular social context (even if that context is "school"), and, after print acquisition, every instance of reading or writing will be for a specific purpose and occasion with particular readers and writers in mind. Reading and writing, therefore, are never separable from social and cultural elements. A corollary point made by David Barton and Rosalind Ivanić, among others, is that the cognitive and societal effects of acquiring literacy are not easily predictable, since, as Brian Street has argued, "the ways in which people address reading and writing are themselves rooted in conceptions of knowledge, identity, and being." Consequently, as Jack Goody has documented, historically, literacy has included the transformation of social systems that rely on literacy and the changing uses of literacy within those evolving systems.

=== Gender ===
Adult literacy rate, male (%), 2015

Adult literacy rate, female (%), 2015

Gender parity indices in youth literacy rates by region, 1990–2015. Progress towards gender parity in literacy started after 1990.

According to 2015 data collected by the UNESCO Institute for Statistics, about two-thirds (63%) of the world's illiterate adults are women. This disparity was even starker in previous decades, and from 1970 to 2000, the global gender gap in literacy decreased significantly. Around the year 2013, however, this progress stagnated, with the gender gap holding almost constant over the last two decades. In general, the gender gap in literacy was not as pronounced as the regional gap; that is, differences between countries were often larger than gender differences within countries.

Sub-Saharan Africa has the lowest overall literacy rate and the widest gender gap: 52% of adult women and 68% of adult men are literate. A similar gender disparity exists in North Africa, where 70% of adult women are literate versus 86% of adult men. In South Asia, 58% of adult women and 77% of adult men are literate.

The 1990 World Conference on Education for All, held in Jomtien, Thailand, brought attention to the literacy gender gap and prompted many developing countries to prioritize women's literacy.

In many contexts, female illiteracy coexists with other aspects of gender inequality. Martha Nussbaum says illiterate women are more vulnerable to becoming trapped in an abusive marriage, given that illiteracy limits their employment opportunities and worsens their position when negotiating within the household. Moreover, Nussbaum links literacy to the ability for women to effectively communicate and collaborate with one another "to participate in a larger movement for political change."

==== Challenges of increasing female literacy ====
Social barriers can limit opportunities to increase literacy skills among women and girls; making literacy classes available can be ineffective when it conflicts with the use of the valuable limited time of women and girls. School-age girls may face more expectations than their male counterparts to perform household work and care for younger siblings. Generational dynamics can also perpetuate these disparities; illiterate parents may not readily appreciate the value of literacy for their daughters, particularly in traditional, rural societies with expectations that girls will remain at home.

A World Bank and International Center for Research on Women review of academic literature concluded that child marriage, which predominantly impacts girls, tends to reduce literacy levels. A 2008 analysis of the issue in Bangladesh found that for every additional year a girl's marriage is delayed, her likelihood of literacy increases by 5.6%. Similarly, a 2014 study found a correlation that in sub-Saharan Africa, marrying early significantly decreases a girl's probability of literacy, even after accounting for other variables.

==== Gender gap for boys in developed countries ====
While women and girls comprise the majority of the global illiterate population, in many developed countries, a literacy-gender gap exists in the opposite direction. Data from the Programme for International Student Assessment has consistently shown the literacy underachievement of boys within member countries of the OECD (Organisation for Economic Co-operation and Development). In view of such findings, many education specialists have recommended changing classroom practices to better accommodate boys' learning styles and removing any gender stereotypes that may create the perception that reading and writing are feminine activities.

=== Socioeconomic impact ===
Many policy analysts consider literacy rates to be a crucial measure of the value of a region's human capital. For example, literate people can be more easily trained than illiterate people and generally have a higher socioeconomic status; thus, they enjoy better health and employment prospects. The international community has come to consider literacy as a key facilitator and goal of development. In regard to the Sustainable Development Goals adopted by the UN in 2015, the UNESCO Institute for Lifelong Learning has declared the "central role of literacy in responding to sustainable development challenges such as health, social equality, economic empowerment and environmental sustainability."

A majority of prisoners have been found to be illiterate, and in Edinburgh prison, winner of the 2010 Libraries Change Lives Award, "the library has become the cornerstone of the prison's literacy strategy", reducing recidivism and reoffending and allowing incarcerated people to work toward attaining higher socioeconomic status once released.

==== Effects on literacy learning ====
As socioeconomics affects brain development and brain functions are heavily involved in processing both input and output, a learner's environment can affect the cognitive process of learning how to read and write. Before a child enters a school setting, their executive function is influenced by their home environment. Research demonstrates that for children who grow up in poverty, their socioeconomic circumstances severely strain their "neuro-endocrine and brain function". This affects a child's ability to regulate environmental stimuli, process and structure information, and plan and effectively execute tasks that involve their working memory—all of these are necessary cognitive facilities to successfully learn how to read and write. Living in poverty is stressful for all involved but is cognitively damaging for young children.

A study done by NICHD indicates that socioeconomics plays a role for children who are young when the family experiences poverty, but shows no indication of adverse effects on reading achievement or behavior for adolescents entering poverty. The data extensively shows that children from low socioeconomic backgrounds had poorer literacy performance, especially in reading. A study done by the OECD, which included over 25 countries in Europe, found that in all studied countries, students who lived in low-income households scored lower in reading than students who lived in high-income households.

A 2024 report by King's College London exploring the connection between literacy, numeracy and homelessness found that low education attainment may increase the likelihood of experiencing homelessness.

Parenting also affects a child's literacy. Field research was done by collecting data from families that were upper, middle, or lower class, or on welfare. The results found that, in a 100-hour week, children in upper-class households experienced an average of over 200,000 words, those in middle- and lower-class households heard about 125,000 words, and children from households on welfare were exposed to the fewest words—62,000 words. This indicates that a child from an upper-class family would be exposed to 8 million more words than a child from a family on welfare. Outside of word exposure, which is essential for word acquisition, the National Center for Educational Statistics found that 41.9% of children from low-income families scored substantially lower on most reading achievements for grades 4, 8, and 12 in 2013.

According to a study performed by ANOVA, multiple socioeconomic variables influence children, such as parental education level, parental occupation, health history, and even usage of technology within the home. With these factors in mind, their study showed that young children are especially susceptible to environmental factors, meaning socioeconomics affects them cognitively and can have adverse effects as their brains continue to develop. However, another study done by the National Longitudinal Survey of Youth (NLSY) around 2012 suggested a slightly different conclusion. While the study agrees that poverty negatively affects childhood literacy, some nuances are added. In both studies, children who experienced poverty scored lower in reading assessments, but the NLSY's study noted that the duration of poverty altered the literacy outcome. It found that children ages 5–11 who experienced "persistent poverty" were more adversely affected than their peers who never experienced poverty. The study acknowledged that other factors affected these children's reading scores, particularly maternal influence. The mothers of these households were scaled based on a "home environment" score, which measured their emotional and verbal responsiveness, acceptance, and involvement with the child and organization. Households experiencing poverty tended to have lower scores, and lower scores correlated with lower reading levels. The study also showed that the effects of poverty on child literacy differed by ethnicity, culture, and gender.

=== Health impacts ===
Print illiteracy generally corresponds with less knowledge about modern health, hygiene, and nutritional practices, and a lack of knowledge can exacerbate a range of health issues. Within developing countries in particular, literacy rates also have implications for child mortality; in these contexts, children of literate mothers are 50% more likely to live past age 5 than children of illiterate mothers. Therefore, public health research has increasingly focused on the potential for literacy skills to allow women to more successfully access healthcare and thereby facilitate gains in child health. Literacy significantly influences healthcare utilization and is a primary predictor for subnational health insurance enrollment disparities.

A 2014 descriptive research survey project correlates literacy levels with the socioeconomic status of women in Oyo State, Nigeria. The study shows that developing literacy in the region will bring "economic empowerment and will encourage rural women to practice hygiene, which will in turn lead to the reduction of birth and death rates."

=== Economic impacts ===
Literacy can increase job opportunities and access to higher education. In 2009, the National Adult Literacy Agency in Ireland commissioned a cost–benefit analysis of adult literacy training, which concluded that there were economic gains for the individuals, the companies they worked for, and the Exchequer, as well as the economy and the country as a whole (e.g., increased GDP).

Korotayev and coauthors found a rather significant correlation between the level of literacy in the early 19th century and successful modernization and economic breakthroughs in the late 20th century, as "literate people could be characterized by a greater innovative-activity level, which provides opportunities for modernization, development, and economic growth."

=== Lifespan development and promotion efforts ===
While informal learning within the home can play an important role in literacy development, gains in childhood literacy often occur in primary school settings. Continuing the global expansion of public education is thus a frequent focus of literacy advocates. These kinds of broad improvements in education often require centralized efforts by national governments; however, local literacy projects implemented by NGOs can play an important role, particularly in rural contexts.

Funding for both youth and adult literacy programs often comes from large international development organizations. USAID, for example, steered donors like the Gates Foundation and the Global Partnership for Education toward the issue of childhood literacy by developing the Early Grade Reading Assessment. Advocacy groups like the National Institute of Adult Continuing Education have frequently called upon international organizations such as UNESCO, the International Labour Organization, the World Health Organization, and the World Bank to prioritize support for adult women's literacy. Efforts to increase adult literacy often encompass other development priorities as well; for example, initiatives in Ethiopia, Morocco, and India have combined adult literacy programs with vocational skills trainings in order to encourage program enrollment and address the complex needs of women (and other marginalized groups) who lack economic opportunities.

In 2013, the UNESCO Institute for Lifelong Learning published a set of case studies on programs that successfully improved female literacy rates. The report features countries from a variety of regions and differing income levels, reflecting the general global consensus on "the need to empower women through the acquisition of literacy skills." Part of the impetus for UNESCO's focus on literacy is a broader effort to respond to globalization and "the shift towards knowledge-based societies" that it has produced. While globalization presents emerging challenges, it also provides new opportunities. Many education and development specialists are hopeful that new ICTs will expand literacy learning opportunities for children and adults, even in countries that have historically struggled to improve literacy rates through more conventional means.

Although most people acquire literacy during childhood, it continues to develop throughout life; literacy is not a skill that is fixed once a person leaves school but remains malleable across the entire lifespan. Among adults, both gains and losses in literacy occur in roughly equal measure, sometimes over relatively short periods of a few years. Even adults with very low literacy levels can acquire literacy over time. Whether a person experiences gains or losses depends on a range of factors, and one of the key factors are the demands and opportunities to engage in literary practices in the workplace, home, or other contexts.

=== Literacy in the digital age ===
The increasing use of digital technologies has expanded the contexts in which reading and writing occur. In addition to understanding written information, digital literacy involves accessing, evaluating, and communicating information through electronic media.

Research has also examined how reading medium influences comprehension. A 2018 meta-analysis by Delgado and colleagues found that reading on paper was associated with better comprehension than reading on digital screens, particularly when readers were given informational texts or had limited time to complete reading tasks. The difference in comprehension also increased over the years examined in the analysis.

The changing nature of literacy is also reflected in international assessments of adult skills. The OECD's 2023 Survey of Adult Skills assesses adaptive problem solving alongside literacy and numeracy, recognizing the importance of applying information and responding to changing circumstances.

=== Literacy as a development indicator ===
Youth and adult literacy rate, 2000–2016 and projections to 2030

The Human Development Index, produced by the United Nations Development Programme (UNDP), uses education as one of its three indicators. Originally, adult literacy represented two-thirds of this education index weight. In 2010, however, the UNDP replaced the adult literacy measure with mean years of schooling. A 2011 UNDP research paper frames this change as a way to "ensure current relevance", arguing that gains in global literacy already achieved between 1970 and 2010 mean that literacy will be "unlikely to be as informative of the future." Other scholars, however, have since warned against overlooking the importance of literacy as an indicator and goal for development, particularly for marginalized groups such as women and rural populations.

The World Bank, along with the UNESCO Institute for Statistics, has developed the Learning Poverty concept and an associated measure that measures the proportion of students who are unable to read and understand a simple story by age 10. In low- and middle-income countries, 53% of children are "learning-poor", as are up to 80% of children in poor countries. In fact, these new measures indicate that these high rates of illiteracy are an "early warning sign that SDG 4 for education and all related global goals are in jeopardy." Current progress in improving literacy rates is seen as much too slow to meet the SDG goals, as at the current rate, approximately 43% of children will still be learning poorly by 2030.

The World Bank and the UNESCO Institute for Statistics developed the concept of learning poverty to measure the proportion of children who are unable to read and understand a simple text by age 10. A 2022 report revised the estimated pre-pandemic learning poverty rate in low- and middle-income countries to 57%. Following school closures and educational disruptions associated with the COVID-19 pandemic, the rate was estimated to have increased to 70%. These findings highlight continuing challenges in achieving Sustainable Development Goal 4, which focuses on equitable and inclusive education.

The Programme for International Student Assessment (PISA) assesses children on reading and math skills at age 15. PISA-D encourages and facilitates PISA testing in low- and middle-income countries. In 2019, "PISA-D results reveal exceptionally low scores for participating countries. Only 23 percent of students tested achieved the minimum level of proficiency in reading, compared with 80 percent of OECD." Minimum proficiency requires students to "read 'simple and familiar texts and understand them literally', as well as demonstrating some ability to connect pieces of information and draw inferences."

The Programme for the International Assessment of Adult Competencies (PIAAC) assesses literacy, numeracy and problem solving for working age population ages 16 to 65.

=== Measuring literacy ===
In 2020, the UNESCO Institute for Statistics estimated the global literacy rate at 86.68%. It is important to understand how literacy rates have been measured in the past as well as how they are currently being measured. Starting in 1975, the head of a household answered a simple yes-or-no question asking whether household members could read and write; in 1988, some countries started using self-reporting as well.

Self-reported data is subjective and has several limitations. First, a simple yes-or-no question does not capture the continuum of literacy. Second, self-reports are dependent on what each individual interprets "reading" and "writing" to mean. In some cultures, drawing a picture may be understood as writing one's name. Lastly, many of the surveys asked one individual to report literacy on behalf of others, which "introduces further noise, in particular when it comes to estimating literacy among women and children, since these groups are less often considered 'head of household'".

In 2007, several countries began introducing literacy tests as a more accurate measurement of literacy rates, including Liberia, South Korea, Guyana, Kenya, and Bangladesh. However, in 2016, the majority of counties still reported literacy through either self-reported measures or other indirect estimates.

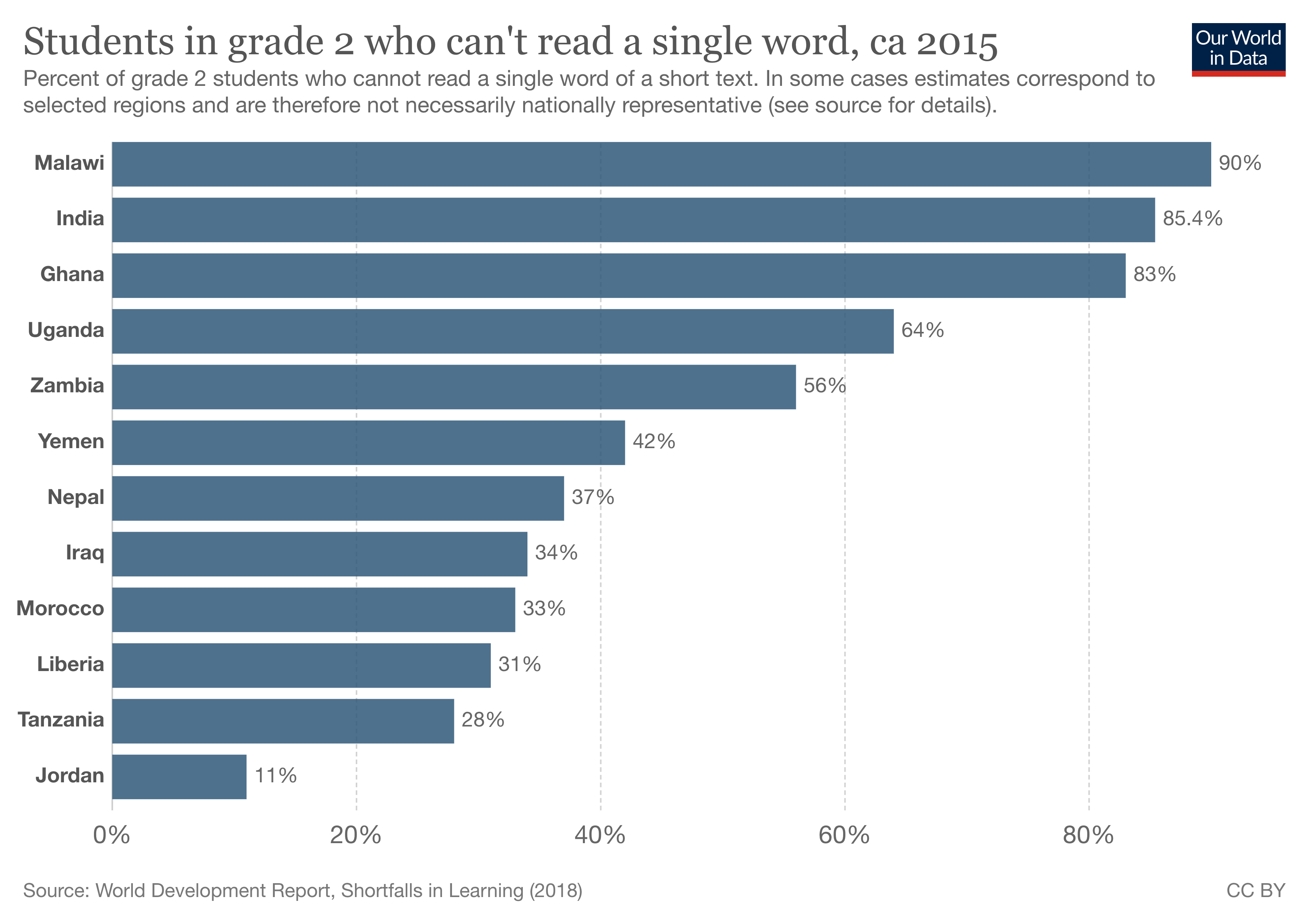
Students in grade 2 who can't read a single word

These indirect measurements are potentially problematic, as many countries measure literacy based on years of schooling. In Greece, an individual is considered literate if they have finished six years of primary education, while in Paraguay, individuals are considered literate if they have completed just two years of primary school.

However, emerging research reveals that educational attainment (e.g., years of schooling) does not perfectly correlate with literacy. Literacy tests show that in many low-income countries, a large proportion of students who have attended two years of primary school cannot read a single word. These rates are as high as 90% of second-grade students in Malawi, 85.4% in rural India, 83% in Ghana, and 64% in Uganda. In India, over 50% of Grade 5 students have not mastered Grade 2 literacy. In Nigeria, only about 1 in 10 women who completed Grade 6 can read a single sentence in their native language. This data reveals that literacy rates measured by using years of schooling as a proxy are potentially unreliable and do not reflect the true literacy rates of populations.

=== Literacy as a human right ===
Unlike medieval times, when reading and writing skills were restricted to a few elites and the clergy, literacy skills are now expected from every member of society. Literacy is therefore considered a human right, essential for lifelong learning and social change, as supported by the 1996 Report of the International Commission on Education for the Twenty-First Century and the 1997 Hamburg Declaration:

Literacy, broadly conceived as the basic knowledge and skills needed by all in a rapidly changing world, is a fundamental human right. (...) There are millions, the majority of whom are women, who lack opportunities to learn or who have insufficient skills to be able to assert this right. The challenge is to enable them to do so. This will often imply the creation of preconditions for learning through awareness raising and empowerment. Literacy is also a catalyst for participation in social, cultural, political and economic activities, and for learning throughout life.

In 2016, the European Literacy Policy Network (an association of European literacy professionals) published a document entitled the European Declaration of the Right to Literacy. It states that:

Everyone in Europe has the right to acquire literacy. EU Member States should ensure that people of all ages, regardless of social class, religion, ethnicity, origin and gender, are provided with the necessary resources and opportunities to develop sufficient and sustainable literacy skills in order to effectively understand and use written communication be in handwritten, in print or digital form.

== Teaching literacy ==
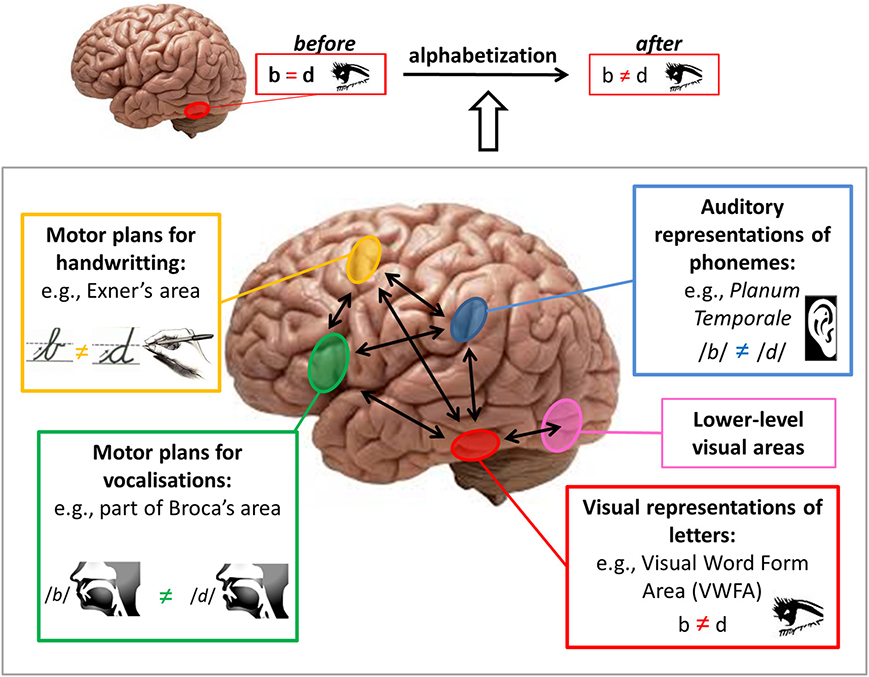
Brain areas involved in literacy acquisition

In school, reading and writing are often taught as separate skills. However, children show curiosity about the written word and begin to experiment with both in a process of emergent literacy and making sense of (and using) the writing system they see used around them. Every new piece of writing draws on previous reading through a process of intertextuality, sometimes explicitly through citation, as in academic writing, and writing about reading is one of the major approaches for teaching writing in higher education. Intertextuality, however, can also be implicit through well-known, recognizable phrases from specific works or genres or through the development of a distinct writing style. Evidence has supported the integration of reading and writing at all levels of schooling, as improvement in one area supports the other. A series of metastudies have examined the effectiveness of various methods of teaching writing, revealing that attention to context, cognitive/motivational factors, and the instruction strategy, among other things, are important.

Reading development involves the acquisition of skills that allow individuals to recognize written words and understand their meaning. Research distinguishes between word recognition and language comprehension, both of which contribute to skilled reading. Early reading instruction in alphabetic writing systems frequently emphasizes phonological awareness and knowledge of relationships between letters and sounds. As readers develop greater accuracy and fluency, vocabulary, grammatical knowledge, and background knowledge become increasingly important for understanding written texts.

For this reason, teaching English reading literacy in the United States is dominated by a focus on a set of discrete decoding skills. From this perspective, literacy—or rather, reading—comprises a number of sub-skills that can be taught to students. These sub-skills include phonological awareness, phonics decoding, fluency, comprehension, and vocabulary. Mastering each of these sub-skills is necessary for students to become proficient readers.

From this same perspective, readers of alphabetic languages must understand the alphabetic principle to master basic reading skills. For this purpose, a writing system is "alphabetic" if it uses symbols to represent phonemes (individual language sounds), though the degree of correspondence between letters and sounds varies between alphabetic languages. Syllabic writing systems (such as Japanese kana) use a symbol to represent a single syllable, and logographic writing systems (such as Chinese) use a symbol to represent a morpheme.

There are a number of approaches to teaching reading. Each is shaped by its assumptions about what literacy is and how it is best learned by students. Phonics instruction, for example, focuses on reading at the level of letters or symbols and their sounds (i.e., sublexical). It teaches readers to decode the letters, or groups of letters, that make up a word. A common method of teaching phonics is synthetic phonics, in which a novice reader pronounces each individual sound and blends them to pronounce the whole word. Another approach is embedded phonics instruction, used more often in whole language reading instruction, in which novice readers learn about the individual letters in words on a just-in-time, just-in-place basis that is tailored to meet each student's reading and writing learning needs. That is, teachers provide phonics instruction opportunistically, within the context of stories or student writing that feature repeat instances of a particular letter or group of letters. Embedded instruction combines letter-sound knowledge with the use of meaningful context to read new and difficult words. Techniques such as directed listening and thinking activities can be used to aid children in learning how to read and in reading comprehension. For students at both primary and secondary levels, writing about what they read as they are learning to write has been found to also be effective in improving their reading skills.

The two most commonly used approaches to reading instruction are structured literacy instruction and balanced literacy instruction. The structured literacy approach explicitly and systematically focuses on phonological awareness, word recognition, phonics, decoding, spelling, and syntax at both the sentence and paragraph levels. The balanced literacy approach, as the name suggests, balances emphasis on phonics and decoding; shared, guided, and independent reading; and grapheme representations with context and imagery. Both approaches have their critics—those who oppose structured literacy claim that by restricting students to phonemes, their fluency development is limited; critics of balanced literacy claim that if phonics and decoding instruction are neglected, students will have to rely on compensatory strategies when confronted with unfamiliar text. (Note: Compensatory strategies include memorizing words, using context to guess words, and even skipping ones they do not know.)

These strategies are taught to students as part of the balanced literacy approach based on a theory about reading development called the three-cueing system. As the name suggests, the three-cueing system uses three cues to determine the meaning of words: grapho-phonetic cues (letter-sound relationships); syntactic cues (grammatical structure); and semantic cues (a word making sense in context). However, cognitive neuroscientist Mark Seidenberg and professor Timothy Shanahan do not support the theory. They say the three-cueing system's value in reading instruction "is a magnificent work of the imagination", and it developed not because teachers lack integrity, commitment, motivation, sincerity, or intelligence, but because they "were poorly trained and advised" about the science of reading. In England, the simple view of reading and synthetic phonics are intended to replace "the searchlights multi-cueing model".

In his 2009 book Reading in the Brain, cognitive neuroscientist Stanislas Dehaene said "cognitive psychology directly refutes any notion of teaching via a 'global' or 'whole language' method." He goes on to talk about "the myth of whole-word reading", saying it has been refuted by experiment. "We do not recognize a printed word through a holistic grasping of its contours, because our brain breaks it down into letters and graphemes."

However, a 2012 hypothesis proposed that reading might be acquired naturally, in the same manner as spoken language, if print is constantly available at an early age. According to this theory, if an appropriate form of written text is made available before formal schooling begins, reading should be learned inductively, emerge naturally, and have no significant negative consequences. This proposal challenges the commonly held belief that written language requires formal instruction and schooling; thus, its success would change current views of literacy and schooling. Using developments in behavioral science and technology, Technology-Assisted Reading Acquisition (TARA), an interactive system, would enable young pre-literate children to accurately perceive and learn the properties of written language through simple exposure to the written form.

In Australia, a number of state governments have introduced Reading Challenges to improve literacy. The Premier's Reading Challenge in South Australia, launched by Premier Mike Rann, has one of the highest participation rates in the world for reading challenges. It has been embraced by more than 95% of public, private, and religious schools.

=== Post-conflict settings ===
Programs have been implemented in regions that have an ongoing conflict or are in a post-conflict stage. The Norwegian Refugee Council Pack program has been used in 13 post-conflict countries since 2003. The program organizers believe that daily routines and otherwise predictable activities help ease the transition from war to peace. Learners can select one area of vocational training for a year-long period; they also complete required courses in agriculture, life skills, literacy, and numeracy. Results have shown that active participation and management of the members of the program are important to the success of the program. These programs share the use of integrated basic education, e.g., literacy, numeracy, scientific knowledge, local history and culture, native and mainstream language skills, and apprenticeships.

=== Teaching migrant, immigrant, and non-native users ===
Although there is considerable awareness that language deficiencies, including a lack of proficiency, are disadvantageous to immigrants settling into a new country, there is a lack of pedagogical approaches to teaching literacy to migrant English-language learners (ELLs). Harvard scholar Catherine Snow called for the gap to be addressed: "The TESOL field needs a concerted research effort to inform literacy instruction for such children—to determine when to start literacy instruction and how to adapt it to the LS reader's needs." Recent developments to address the gap in teaching literacy to foreign language learners (Note: See also: ESL) have been ongoing, with promising results seen with a curricular framework from the Harvard Graduate School of Education, which integrates Teaching for Understanding.

A series of pilot projects have been carried out in the Middle East and Africa, and significant interest from the learners has been seen in the use of visual arts as springboards for literacy-oriented instruction. In one project, migrant women were provided with cameras and took the instructor on a walking tour of their village. There, they photographed places and activities that would later be used for writings about their daily lives—in essence, a narrative of life. Other primers for writing activities include painting, sketching, and other craft projects.

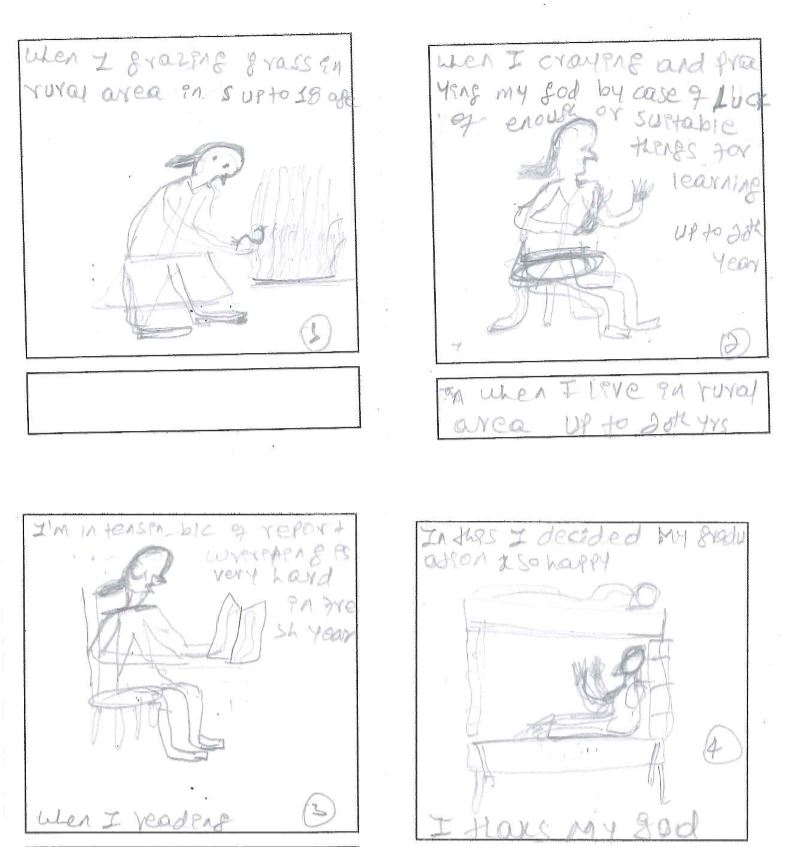
Sample milestone sketch

In another series of pilot studies, alternatives to instructing literacy to migrant English-language learners were investigated, starting with simple trials aiming to test the effects of teaching photography to participants with no prior photography background and then painting and sketching activities that could later be integrated into a larger pedagogical initiative. In efforts to develop alternative approaches for literacy instruction utilizing visual arts, work was carried out with Afghan laborers, Bangladeshi tailors, Emirati media students, internal Ethiopian migrants (both laborers and university students), and a street child.

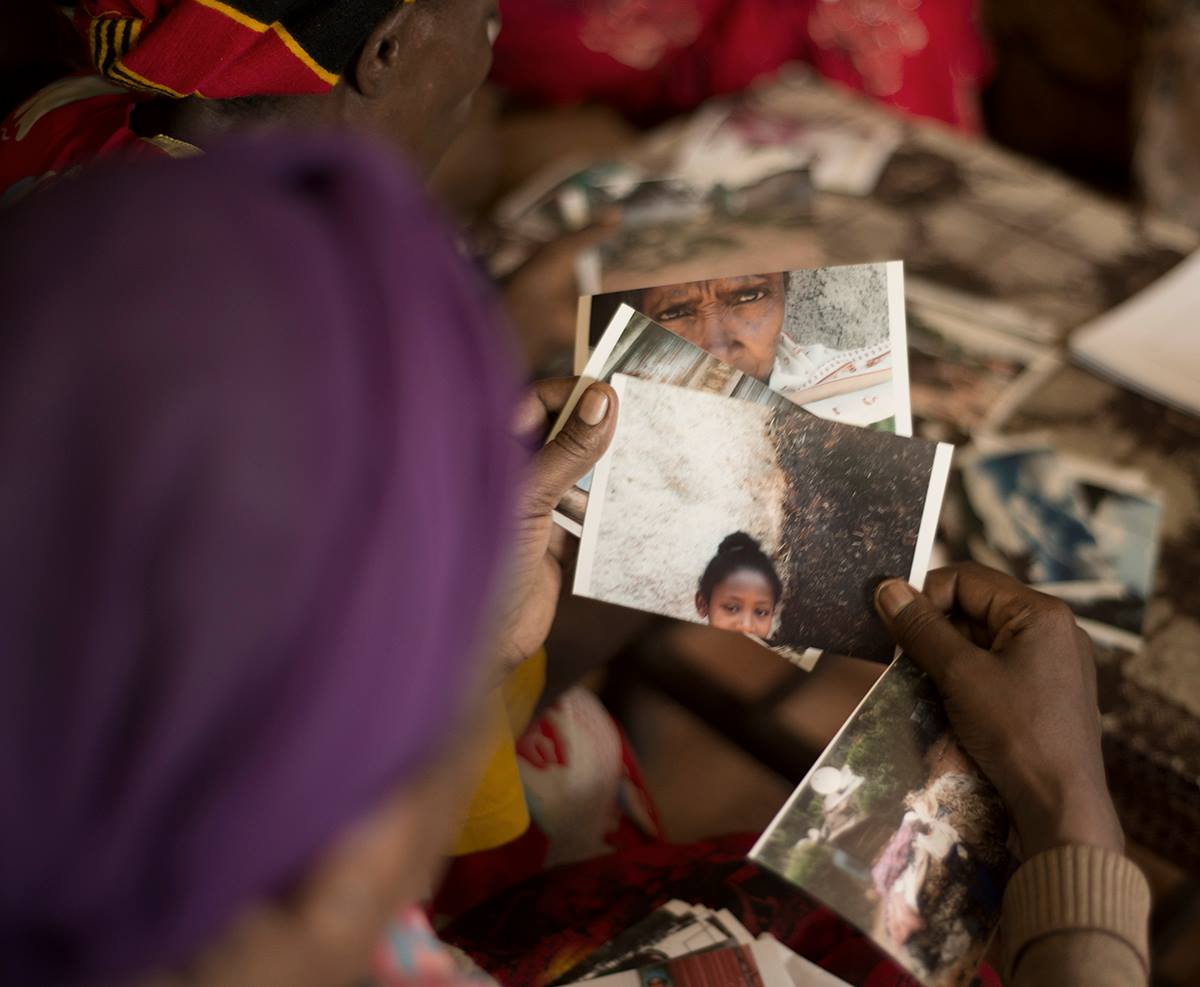
Reviewing photos after a photowalk

It should be pointed out that in these challenging contexts, sometimes the teaching of literacy may have unforeseen barriers. The EL Gazette reported that in the trials carried out in Ethiopia, for example, it was found that all ten of the participants had problems with vision. In order to overcome this or avoid such challenges, preliminary health checks can help inform pre-teaching in order to better assist in the teaching and learning of literacy.

Using a visual arts approach to literacy instruction can provide benefits by incorporating a traditional literacy approach (reading and writing) while also addressing 21st-century digital literacy through the use of digital cameras and posting images onto the web. Many scholars, such as Hutchison and Woodward, feel that it is necessary to include digital literacy under the traditional umbrella of literacy instruction, specifically when engaging second language learners.

A visual arts approach to literary instruction for migrant populations can also be blended with core curricular goals.

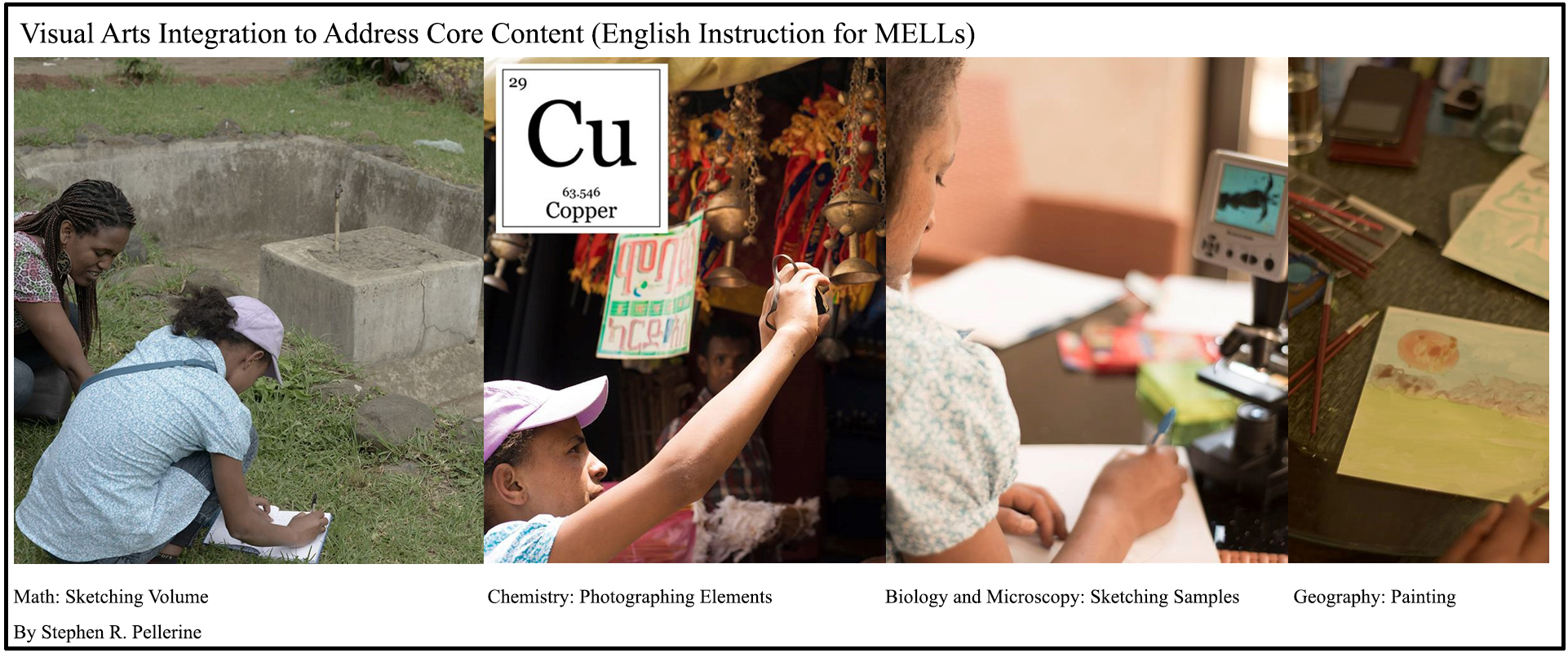
Integrating Common Core content into language training with MELL

A pressing challenge in education is the instruction of literacy to migrant English-language learners (MELLs), a term coined by Pellerine and not limited to English. "Due to the growing share of immigrants in many Western societies, there has been increasing concern for the degree to which immigrants acquire language that is spoken in the destination country".

While learning literacy in one's first language can be challenging, the challenge becomes even more cognitively demanding when learning a second language. The task can become considerably more difficult when confronted by a migrant who has made a sudden change by immigrating and requires the second language immediately upon arrival. In most instances, a migrant will not have the opportunity to start school again in grade one and acquire the language naturally; instead, alternative interventions need to take place. In these cases, a visual arts approach can be helpful—taking a photo, sketching an event, or painting an image have been seen as effective ways to understand the intention of the learner as they can incorporate orality.

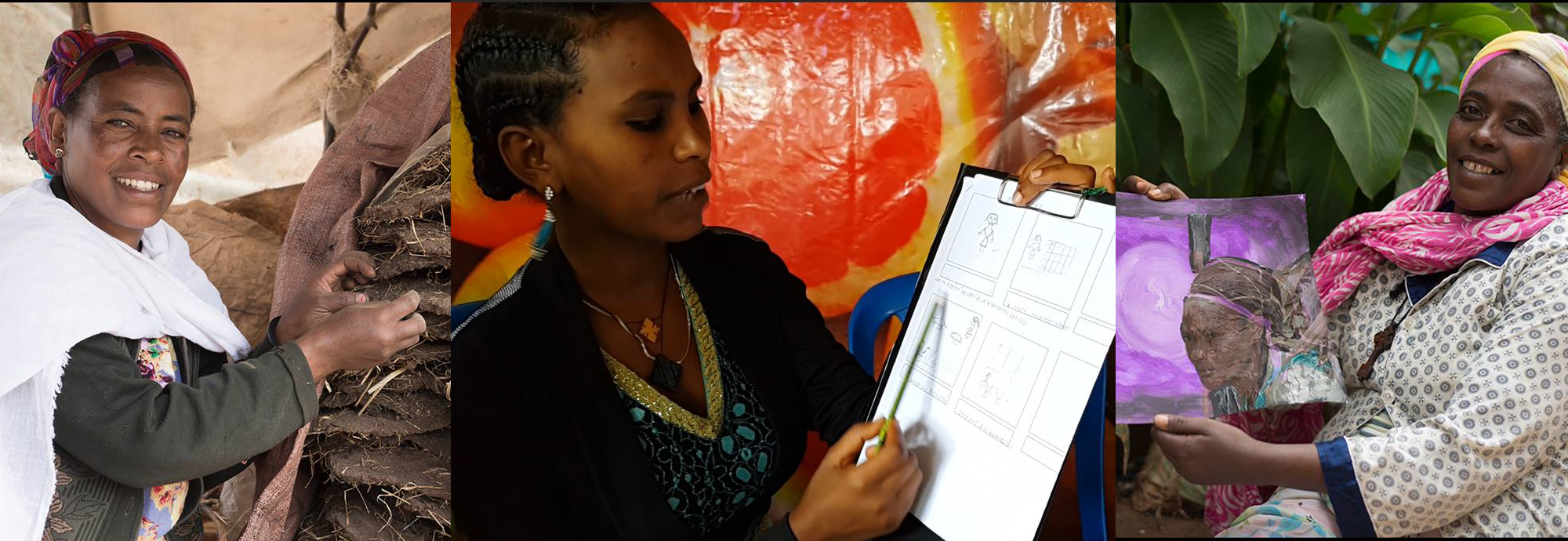
Including orality

In the above image, from left to right:

- An image taken during a phototour of the participant's village. This image is of the individual at her shop with one of the products she sells: dung for cooking fuel. The image helps the instructor understand the realities of the participant's daily life, and most importantly, it gives the participant the opportunity to determine what is important to them.
- An image of a student explaining to a group and elaborating on a drawn series of milestones in her life. This student had a very basic ability and, with some help, was able to write brief captions under the images. While she speaks, her story is recorded to help her understand and develop it in the new language.
- A painting created by composite in a graphics editing program. With further training, participants can learn how to blend images, thereby introducing elements of digital literacy that are beneficial in many spheres of life in the 21st century.

In a study based in Ethiopia, participants were asked to rate their preference for activity on a scale of 1–10. The survey prompt was: "On a scale of 1 to 10, how would you rate photography as an activity that helped you get inspiration for your writing activities (think of enjoyment and usefulness)?" The activities used as primers for writing were rated, in order of preference:

- Photography: 97%
- Oral presentations/sharing your art: 92%
- Process painting: 84%
- Painting: 82%
- Sketching: 78%
- Gluing activities: 72%
- Stencil/tracing activities: 60%

More research would need to be conducted to confirm such trends.

Authorship programs have been successful in bringing student work together in book format as part of the program's culmination. These books can be used to document learning, and more importantly, to reinforce language and content goals.

Sample covers of completed authorship-created books

The collection of such writings into books can trigger both intrinsic and extrinsic motivation. Feedback by students involved in such initiatives indicates that the healthy pressures of collective and collaborative work were beneficial.

== By continent ==
Most illiterate people now live in southern Asia or sub-Saharan Africa.

=== Europe ===
==== United Kingdom ====
On average, girls do better than boys at English, yet nearly one in ten young adult women have poor reading and writing skills in the UK in the 21st century, which seriously damages their employment prospects. Many are trapped in poverty but hide their lack of reading skills due to social stigma.

===== England =====
Literacy is first documented to have occurred in the area of modern England on 24 September 54 BCE, when Julius Caesar and Quintus Cicero wrote to Marcus Cicero "from the nearest shores of Britain". Literacy was widespread under Roman rule but became very rare, limited almost entirely to churchmen, after the fall of the Western Roman Empire. In 12th and 13th century England, the ability to recite a particular passage from the Bible (Psalm 51) in Latin entitled a common law defendant to the benefit of clergy and trial before an ecclesiastical court, where sentences were more lenient, instead of a secular one, where hanging was a likely sentence. Thus, literate defendants often claimed the benefit of clergy, while an illiterate person who had memorized the psalm used in the literacy test could also claim the benefit of clergy.

Despite lacking a system of free and compulsory primary schooling, England reached near universal literacy in the 19th century as a result of shared, informal learning provided by family members, fellow workers, or benevolent employers. Even with near-universal literacy, the gap between male and female rates persisted until the early 20th century. Many women in the West during the 19th century were able to read but unable to write.

===== Wales =====
Formal higher education in the arts and sciences in Wales, from the Middle Ages to the 18th century, was limited to the wealthy and the clergy. Following the Roman occupation and the conquest by the English, education in Wales was at a low point during the early modern period; in particular, formal education was only available in English while the majority of the population spoke only Welsh. The first modern grammar schools were established in Welsh towns such as Ruthin, Brecon, and Cowbridge. One of the first modern national education methods to use the native Welsh language was started by Griffith Jones in 1731. Jones became rector of Llanddowror in 1716 and remained there for the rest of his life. He organized and introduced a Welsh language-circulating school system, which was attractive and effective for Welsh speakers, while also teaching them English, which gave them access to broader educational sources. The circulating schools may have taught half the country's population to read. Literacy rates in Wales by the mid-18th century were one of the highest.

==== Continental Europe ====
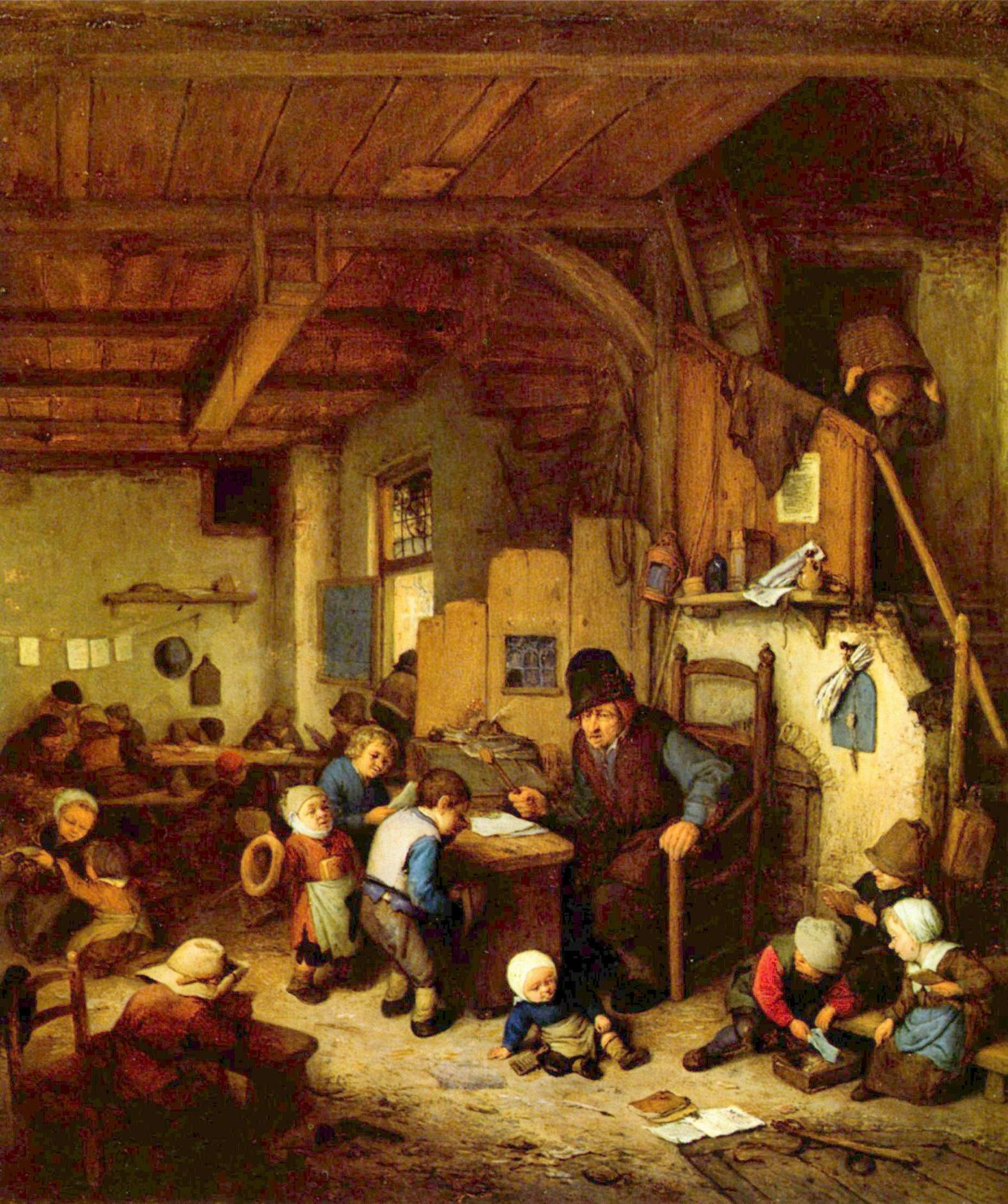
Dutch schoolmaster and children, 1662

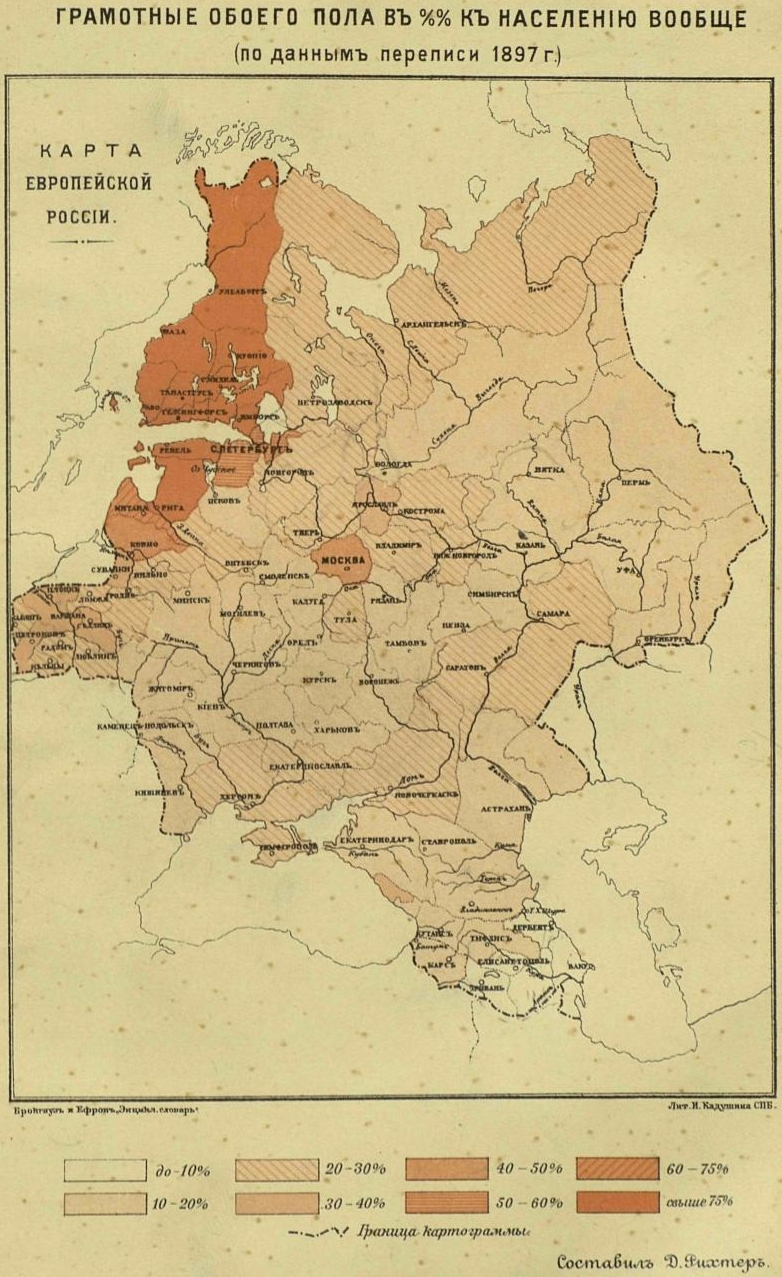
Until the beginning of 20th century, most of the population in the Russian Empire was illiterate (map of 1897 census literacy data).

The ability to read did not necessarily mean the ability to write. The 1686 church law (kyrkolagen) of the Kingdom of Sweden (modern Sweden, Finland, Latvia, and Estonia) made literacy compulsory, and by 1800, the percent of people able to read was close to 100%. This was directly dependent on the need to read religious texts in the Lutheran faith in Sweden and Finland; as a result, literacy in these countries was specifically focused on reading. However, as late as the 19th century, many Swedes, especially women, could not write. Iceland was an exception, as it achieved widespread literacy without formal schooling, libraries, or printed books via informal tuition by religious leaders and peasant teachers.

Historian Ernest Gellner argues that Continental European countries were far more successful in implementing educational reform because their governments were more willing to invest in the population as a whole. Government oversight allowed countries to standardize curriculum and secure funding through legislation, thus enabling educational programs to have a broader reach.

Although present-day concepts of literacy have much to do with the 15th-century invention of the movable type printing press, it was not until the Industrial Revolution of the mid-19th century that paper and books became affordable to all classes of industrialized society. Until then, only a small percent of the population was literate, as only wealthy individuals and institutions could afford the materials. Even today, the cost of paper and books is a barrier to universal literacy in some developing nations.

On the other hand, historian Harvey Graff argues that the introduction of compulsory education was, in part, an effort to control the type of literacy the working class had access to. According to Graff, learning was increasing outside of formal settings (e.g., schools), and this uncontrolled reading could lead to increased radicalization of the populace. In his view, mass schooling was meant to temper and control literacy, not spread it. Graff also says, using the example of Sweden, that mass literacy can be achieved without formal schooling or instruction in writing.

=== North America ===
==== Mexico ====
In the last 40 years, the rate of illiteracy in Mexico has been steadily decreasing. In the 1960s, because the majority of the residents of the federal capital were illiterate, the planners of the Mexico City Metro designed a series of unique icons to identify each station in the system in addition to its formal name. The INEGI's census data in 1970 showed a national average illiteracy rate of 25.8%, which had decreased to under 7% by the 2010 census. Mexico still has a gender educational bias—the illiteracy rate for women was 8.1% compared with 5.6% for men.

Rates differ across regions and states. The states with the highest poverty rate had greater than 15% illiteracy in 2010: 17.8% in Chiapas, 16.7% in Guerrero, and 16.3% in Oaxaca. In contrast, the illiteracy rates in the Federal District (now part of Mexico City) and in some northern states like Nuevo León, Baja California, and Coahuila were below 3% in the 2010 census (2.1%, 2.2%, 2.6%, and 2.6%, respectively).

=== South America ===
==== Brazil ====
In 1964, Paulo Freire was arrested and exiled for teaching peasants to read. However, since democracy returned to Brazil, there has been a steady increase in the percentage of literate people. Educators with the Axé project in the city of Salvador, Bahía, attempt to improve literacy rates among urban youth, especially youth living on the streets, through the use of cultural music and dances. Then, "they are encouraged to go on learning and become professional artists."

=== Africa ===
The literacy rates in Africa vary significantly between countries. The registered literacy rate in Libya was 86.1% in 2004, and UNESCO says that the literacy rate in the region of Equatorial Guinea is approximately 95%, while the literacy rate in South Sudan is approximately 27%.

In sub-Saharan Africa, youth from wealthier families often have more educational opportunities to become literate than poorer youth, who may need to leave school because they are needed at home to farm or care for siblings. Additionally, the rate of literacy has not improved enough to compensate for the effects of demographic growth. As a result, the number of illiterate adults has risen by 27% over the last 20 years, reaching 169 million in 2010. Thus, out of the 775 million illiterate adults in the world in 2010, more than one fifth (20%) were in sub-Saharan Africa. The countries with the lowest levels of literacy in the world are also concentrated in this region, where adult literacy rates can be well below 50%.

Country	Literacy rate
Algeria	81.4% (2025)
Angola	72.6% (2024)
Botswana	88.5% (2025)
Burkina Faso	28.7%
Chad	35.4%
Djibouti	70% (est.)
Egypt	72%
Equatorial Guinea	94%
Eritrea	80% (est.)
Ethiopia	37% (unofficial); 63% (official) (1984)
Guinea	41%
Kenya	83% (2025)
Mali	33.4%
Mauritius	89.8% (2011)
Niger	28.7%
Senegal	49.7%
Somalia	Unknown
Sierra Leone	43.3%
Uganda	72.2%
Zimbabwe	86.5% (2016 est.)

==== Algeria ====
The literacy rate in Algeria is 81.4%, attributable to the fact that education is compulsory and free up to age 17.

==== Burkina Faso ====
Burkina Faso has a very low literacy rate of 28.7%, defined as anyone at least 15 years of age who can read and write. To improve the literacy rate, the government has received at least 80 volunteer teachers. A severe lack of primary school teachers causes problems for any attempt to improve the literacy rate and school enrollment.

==== Egypt ====
Egypt has a relatively high literacy rate. The adult literacy rate in 2010 was estimated at 72%.

==== Ethiopia ====
The Ethiopians are among the first literate people in sub-saharan Africa, having written, read, and created manuscripts in the ancient Ge'ez language (an Amharic language) since the 2nd century CE. All boys learned to read the Psalms around the age of 7. The national literacy campaign introduced in 1978 increased literacy rates to between 37% (unofficial) and 63% (official) by 1984.

==== Guinea ====
Guinea has a literacy rate of 41%, defined as anyone at least 15 years old who can read or write. Guinea was the first to use the Literacy, Conflict Resolution, and Peacebuilding (LCRP) project. This project was developed to increase agriculture production, develop key skills, resolve conflict, and improve literacy and numeracy skills. The LCRP worked within refugee camps near the border of Sierra Leone; however, this project only lasted from 1999 to 2001. There are several other international projects working within the country that have similar goals.

==== Kenya ====
The literacy rate in Kenya among people below 20 years of age is over 70%, as the first 8 years of primary school are provided tuition-free by the government. In January 2008, the government began offering a limited program of free secondary education. Literacy is much higher among the young than among the older population, with the total being about 81.54% for the country. Most of this literacy, however, is at an elementary level—not secondary or advanced.

==== Mali ====
In Mali in 2015, the adult literacy rate was 33%, one of the lowest in the world, with males having a 43.1% literacy rate and females having a 24.6% rate. The government defines literacy as anyone at least 15 who can read or write. In recent years, the government of Mali and international organizations have taken steps to improve the literacy rate. The government recognized the slow progress and began creating ministries for basic education and literacy in their national languages in 2007; they also increased the education budget by 3%, when it was at 35% in 2007. The lack of literate adults causes the programs to be slowed—they need qualified female instructors, which is problematic as many men refuse to send female family members to be trained by male teachers.

==== Mauritius ====
The adult literacy rate in Mauritius was estimated at 89.8% in 2011. Male literacy was 92.3%, and female literacy was 87.3%.

==== Niger ====
Niger has an extremely low literacy rate of 28.7%, in part due to the gender gap—men have a literacy rate of 42.9%, while for women it is only 15.1%. The Nigerien government defines literacy as anyone who can read or write over the age of 15. The Niass Tijāniyyah, a Sufi order, has started anti-poverty, empowerment, and literacy campaigns. The women in Kiota had not attempted to improve their education or economic standing until Saida Oumul Khadiri Niass, known as Maman and married to a leader of the Niass Tijaniyya, talked to men and women throughout the community, changing the community's beliefs on appropriate behavior for women. Maman's efforts have allowed women in Kiota to own small businesses, sell in the market, attend literacy classes, and organize small associations that can give microloans. Maman personally teaches children in and around Kiota, with special attention to girls. Maman has her students require instructor permission to allow the girls' parents to marry their daughters early, increasing the amount of education these girls receive as well as delaying marriage, pregnancy, and having children.

==== Senegal ====
Senegal has a literacy rate of 49.7%, defined as anyone who is at least 15 and can read and write. However, many students do not attend school long enough to be considered literate. The government did not begin actively attempting to improve the literacy rate until 1971, when it gave the responsibility to the Department for Vocational Training at the Secretariat for Youth and Sports. This department, and those that followed, had no clear policy on literacy until the Department of Literacy and Basic Education was formed in 1986. The government of Senegal relies heavily on funding from the World Bank to fund its school system.

==== Somalia ====
There is no reliable data on the nationwide literacy rate in Somalia. A 2013 FSNAU survey indicates considerable differences per region, with the autonomous northeastern Puntland region having the highest registered literacy rate at 72%.

==== Sierra Leone ====
The Sierra Leone government defines literacy as anyone over the age of 15 who can read and write in English, Mende, Temne, or Arabic. Official statistics put the literacy rate at 43.3%. Sierra Leone was the second country to use the Literacy, Conflict Resolution and Peacebuilding project. However, fighting near the city where the project was centered caused a delay until an arms amnesty was in place.

=== Asia ===
Country	Adult literacy rate	Youth literacy rate (15–24)
Afghanistan	43% (2020)	65% (2020)
Bangladesh	72.76% (2016)	92.24% (2016)
China	96.7% (2015)	
India	74.04% (2011)	89.6% (2015)
Iran	Unclear	
Laos	Unclear	
Nepal	67.5% (2007)	89.9% (2015)
Pakistan	58% (2017)	75.6% (2015)
Philippines	91.6% (2019)	
Sri Lanka	92.63% (2015)	98% (2015)

==== Afghanistan ====
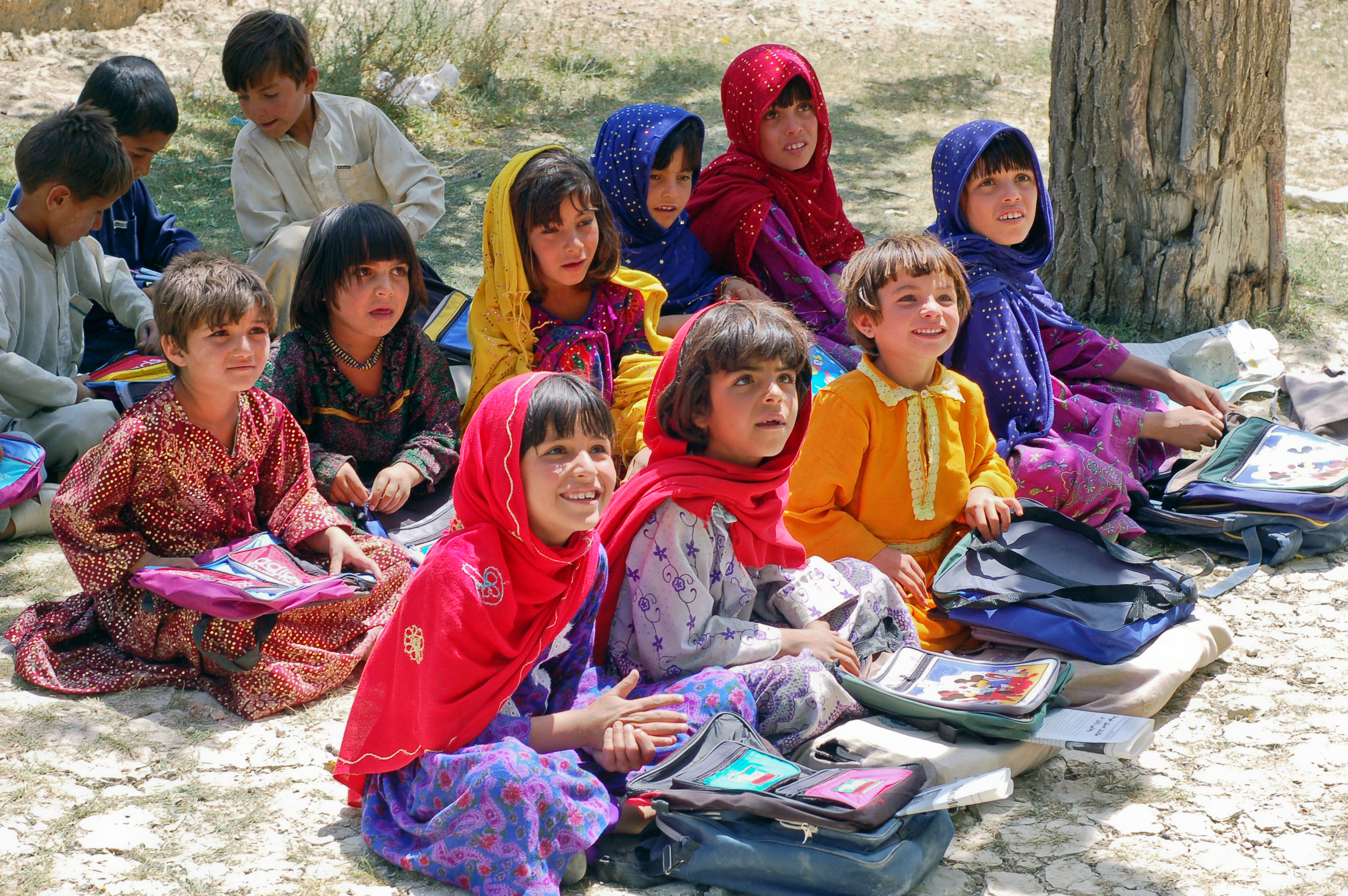
Young school girls in Paktia Province of Afghanistan

According to UNESCO, Afghanistan has one of the lowest literacy rates in the world. As of 2020, over 10 million youth and adults are illiterate. However, since 2016, the country has made significant progress. While in 2016–2017 the literacy rate was 34.8%, the UNESCO Institute for Statistics recently confirmed that it has increased to 43%. "That is a remarkable 8 percent increase." In addition, the literacy rate for youths aged 15–24 has substantially increased and now stands at 65%.

However, there are still a large number of people who lack literacy and opportunities to access continuing education. There is also a substantial gender gap: the literacy rate for men stands at 55%, while for women it is only 29.8%. The UNESCO Institute for Lifelong Learning has provided technical support to the government of Afghanistan since 2012, with the aim of improving the literacy skills of an estimated 1.2 million people.

To improve the literacy rate, the US military taught Afghan Army recruits how to read before teaching them how to fire a weapon. In 2009, US commanders estimated that as many as 65% of recruits may be illiterate.

==== China ====
While literacy in Chinese can be assessed by reading comprehension tests, just as in other languages, historically, literacy has often been judged by the number of Chinese characters introduced during the speaker's schooling, with a few thousand considered the minimum for practical literacy.

The CIA World Factbook says 96.7% of Chinese people are literate. In classical Chinese civilization, access to literacy for all classes originated with Confucianism, where previously literacy was generally limited to the aristocracy, merchants, and priests.

==== India ====
Literacy is defined by the Registrar General and Census Commissioner of India as the ability of "a person aged 7 years and above to both write and read with understanding in any language." According to the 2011 census, the literacy rate stood at 74%.

==== Iran ====
In 2023, the Iranian government stopped a literacy campaign that had begun in 1930, despite 9 million people still being reported as illiterate. The government reported that elementary school education cost 5–40 million toman (approximately US$12–95 or €11–89) per child per year, and 27% of children did not sign up for first grade because of the cost.

==== Laos ====
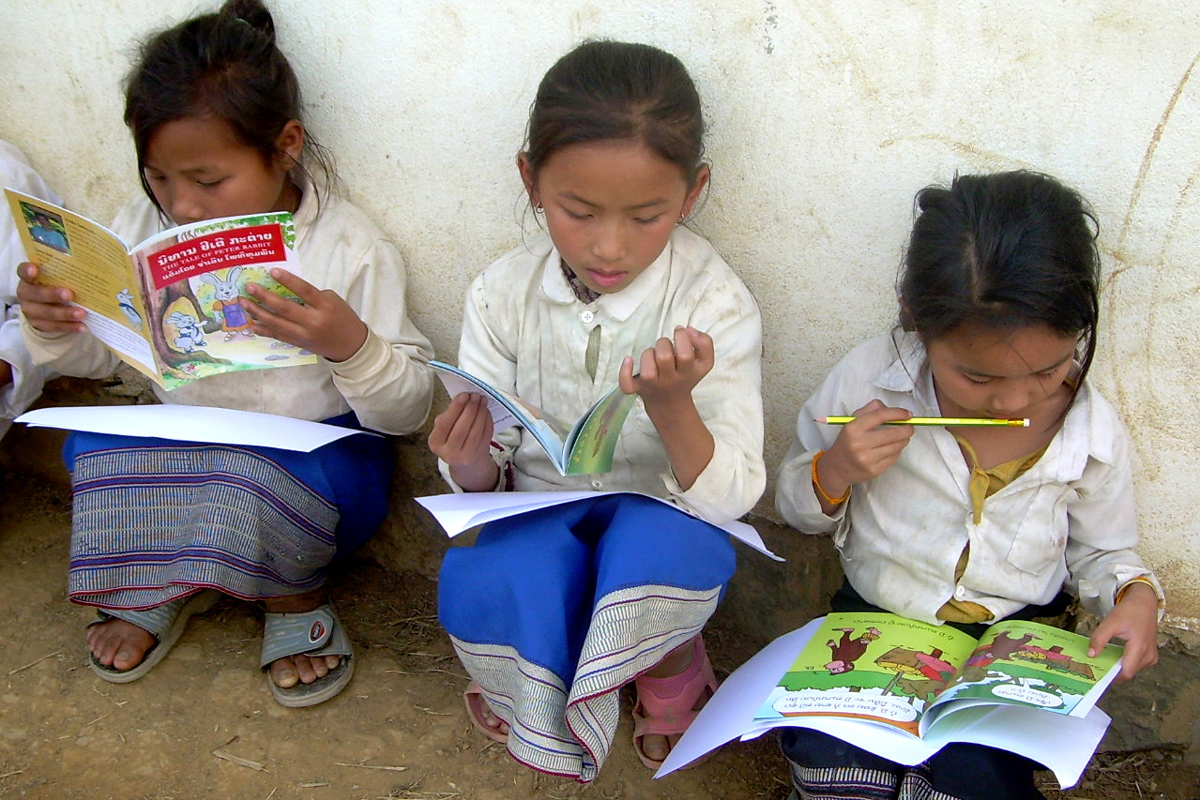
Three Laotian girls sit outside their school reading.

Laos has the lowest level of adult literacy in all of Southeast Asia, other than East Timor.

Obstacles to literacy vary by country and culture, as writing systems, quality of education, availability of written material, competition from other sources (television, video games, cell phones, and family obligations), and culture all influence literacy levels. In Laos, which has a phonetic alphabet, reading is relatively easy to learn—especially compared to English, where spelling and pronunciation rules are filled with exceptions, and Chinese, with thousands of symbols to be memorized. However, a lack of books and other written materials has hindered functional literacy in Laos. Many children and adults read so haltingly that the skill is hardly beneficial.

A literacy project in Laos addresses this by using what it calls "books that make literacy fun!" The project, Big Brother Mouse, publishes colorful, easy-to-read books, then delivers them during book parties at rural schools. Some of the books are modeled on successful Western books by authors such as Dr. Seuss; the most popular, however, are traditional Laotian fairy tales. Two popular collections of folktales were written by Siphone Vouthisakdee, who comes from a village where only five children finished primary school.

Big Brother Mouse has also created village reading rooms and published books for adult readers about subjects such as Buddhism, health, and baby care.

==== Pakistan ====
In Pakistan, the National Commission for Human Development aims to bring literacy to adults, especially women. While speaking at a function held in connection with International Literacy Day, Islamabad Director Kozue Kay Nagata said:

Illiteracy in Pakistan has fallen over two decades, thanks to the government and people of Pakistan for their efforts working toward meeting the Millennium Development Goals. Today, 70 percent of Pakistani youths can read and write. In 20 years, illiterate population has been reduced significantly.

She also emphasized the need to do more to improve literacy in the country, saying:

The proportion of population in Pakistan lacking basic reading and writing is too high. This is a serious obstacle for individual fulfillment, to the development of societies, and to mutual understanding between peoples.

Referring to the recent national survey carried out by the Ministry of Education, Trainings and Standards in Higher Education with the support of UNESCO, UNICEF, and provincial and area departments of education, Nagata pointed out that in Pakistan, although 70% of children finish primary school, a gender gap still exists as 68% of girls finish compared to 71% of boys.

Referring specifically to Punjab, she said that while the primary school completion rate is higher at 76%, there is a gender gap of 8 percentage points: 72% of girls compared to 80% for boys. She also noted that the average cost per primary school student (ages five–nine) was higher in Punjab at Rs 6,998 (approximately US$24 or €22.5).

In Balochistan, although almost the same amount (Rs 6,985) is spent per child as in Punjab, the primary school completion rate is only 53%: 54% for girls and 52% for boys.

The Literate Pakistan Foundation, a non-profit organization established in 2003, is a case study bringing to light solutions for improving literacy rates in Pakistan. Their data shows that in Khyber Pakhtunkhwa, the primary school completion rate is 67%, which is lower than the national average of 70%. Furthermore, a gender gap exists, with only 65% of girls completing primary school compared to 68% of boys. In Khyber Pakhtunkhwa, the education expenditure per student at the primary school level (age five–nine) is Rs 8,638 ($30, €28).

In Sindh, the primary school completion rate is 63%, with a gender gap of 67% of girls completing primary school compared to 60% of boys. In Khyber Pakhtunkhwa, the education expenditure per student at the primary school level (age five–nine) is Rs 5,019 ($17.50, €16.50).

Nagata, referencing the report, said that the most common reason for children ages 10–18 (both boys and girls) leaving school is "the child [is] not willing to go to school", which may be related to quality and learning outcome. She added that the second-highest reason for girls living in rural communities dropping out is that their "parents did not allow" them to continue school, which might be related to prejudice and cultural norms surrounding girls.

==== Philippines ====
About 91.6% of Filipinos ages 10–64 were functionally literate in 2019, according to the results of the 2019 Functional Literacy, Education and Mass Media Survey; this translates to around 73.0 million out of the population of 79.7 million. Starting in 300 BCE, early Filipinos devised and used their own writing system derived from the Brahmic family of scripts of ancient India. Baybayin became the most widespread of these derived scripts by the 11th century. Early chroniclers, who came during the first Spanish expeditions to the islands, noted the proficiency of some of the natives, especially the chieftain and local kings, in Sanskrit, Old Javanese, Old Malay, and several other languages.

During the Spanish colonization of the islands, reading materials were destroyed far less than during the Spanish colonization of the Americas. Education and literacy were introduced solely to the Peninsulares and remained a privilege until the arrival of Americans, who introduced a public school system to the country, and English became the lingua franca in the Philippines. During the brief Japanese occupation of the Philippines, the Japanese were able to teach their language and teach the children their written language.

==== Sri Lanka ====
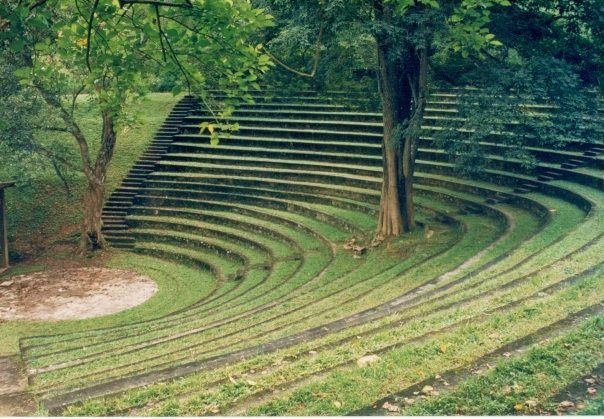
The University of Peradeniya's Sarachchandra open-air theatre, named in memory of Ediriweera Sarachchandra, Sri Lanka's premier playwright

With a literacy rate of 92.5%, Sri Lanka has one of the most literate populations among developing nations. Its youth literacy rate stands at 98%, its computer literacy rate at 35%, and its primary school enrollment rate at over 99%. An education system that dictates nine years of compulsory schooling for every child is in place. The free education system, established in 1945, is a result of the initiative of C. W. W. Kannangara and A. Ratnayake. Sri Lanka is one of the few countries in the world that provides universal free education from the primary to the tertiary stage.

=== Oceania ===
==== Australia ====
A 2016–2017 survey of adult skills conducted by the Australian Bureau of Statistics on behalf of the OECD found that one in five adults of working age has low literacy skills, numeracy skills, or both. The Australian Early Development Census National Report for 2021 reported that 82.6% of five-year-olds are on track to develop good language and cognitive skills. In 2012–2013, Australia had 1515 public library service points, lending almost 174 million items to 10 million members at an average per capita cost of just under AU$45. By 2020–2021, this had increased to a total of 1690 library outlets with just over 9 million registered or active members.

== See also ==
- Balanced literacy – Taking in the meaning of letters or symbols
- Book desert – Geographic area where books are hard to find
- Dysgraphia – Neurological disorder of written expression
- International Literacy Day – International observance, 8 September
- International Literacy Foundation
- Legal literacy – Empowerment of individuals regarding issues involving the law
- List of countries by literacy rate
- Literacy in the United States
- Postliterate society – Society in which literacy is uncommon due to technological advances
- Psychological literacy – Capacity to use knowledge from psychology
- Right to education – Human right
- Structured literacy – Taking in the meaning of letters or symbols
- Teaching reading – Taking in the meaning of letters or symbols
- World Literacy Foundation – International not-for-profit organization
