= UNESCO Institute for Lifelong Learning =

Non-profit international research, training, information certre

Coordinates: 53°34′07″N 9°58′36″E

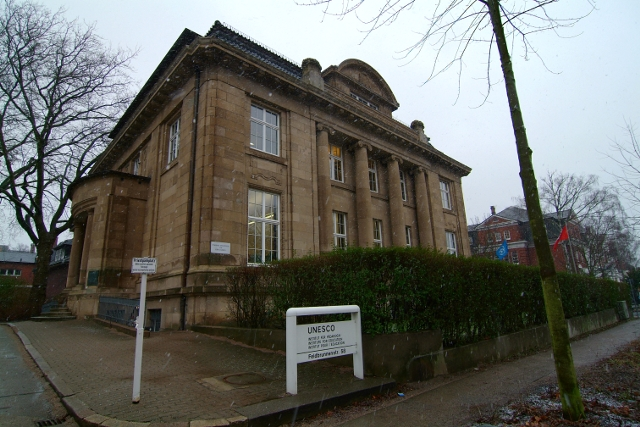
UNESCO Institute for Lifelong Learning

The UNESCO Institute for Lifelong Learning (UIL), formerly UNESCO Institute for Education, is one of six educational institutes of UNESCO. It is a non-profit international research, training, information, documentation and publishing centre on literacy, non-formal education, adult and lifelong learning. It provides services to UNESCO's Member States, NGOs, and grassroots and community organizations, as well as to partners in civil society and the private sector. The Institute works in close collaboration with its Paris headquarters, with UNESCO field offices in different countries, with sister institutes and with national and international partners.

UIL is based in Hamburg, Germany. The Senate (government) of the Free and Hanseatic City of Hamburg provides the Institute with premises close to the University of Hamburg in a historic villa built for the shipping magnate Albert Ballin.

== Mission ==
UIL's mission is to see to it that all forms of education and learning – formal, non-formal and informal – are recognized, valued and available for meeting the demands of individuals and communities throughout the world. UIL responds to these demands and helps meet the challenges facing humanity (peace and democracy, sustainable development and poverty eradication, nurturing diversity, defeating HIV/AIDS, protecting the environment) with policy-driven research, capacity-building, networking, publications and technical services for Member States and non-governmental and civil society organisations, as well as private providers at their request.

== Projects ==
- Publication of the International Review of Education, the longest-running international journal on comparative education
- Coordination of the 6th International Conference on Adult Education (CONFINTEA VI)
- ALADIN network
- Coordination of the Adult Learners Week
- Cooperation with the Association for the Development of Education in Africa (ADEA)

== Research ==
UIL's research covers appropriate concepts, good practice, favourable conditions and innovative approaches in the areas of literacy, non-formal education, adult and lifelong learning in different cultural contexts, including all modes of learning (formal, non-formal and informal), with a view to the creation of lifelong learning environments, the making of literate societies and the building of learning societies. All research activities aim at promoting adult and lifelong learning and at highlighting the contribution of learning to poverty alleviation, sustainable human development, democracy and critical citizenship.

Research work is mainly policy-driven and action-oriented. The research carried out by the Institute may take the form of individual case and country studies, comparative analyses, regional and cross-regional syntheses, international surveys, conceptual and position papers, co-operative and joint investigations with academics, partner institutions, governmental organizations, NGOs and CSOs, etc.

Specific research questions and themes relate to the following:

- Theories and practices of literacy
- Foundations of lifelong learning
- The making of literate societies
- The creation of supportive policy and legislative environments/conditions for lifelong learning;
- The creation of literate environments, especially in multicultural and multilingual settings;
- Integration of formal, non-formal and informal education: recognition, accreditation and validation of non-formal, informal and experiential learning; qualification frameworks, equivalencies and bridges;
- Adult learning for sustainable development with a focus on HIV/AIDS, environmental protection, democratic participation, conflict prevention, critical citizenship and good governance;
- Gender mainstreaming in literacy, non-formal education, adult and lifelong learning with a focus on budgeting, monitoring and evaluation;
- Development of gender-just and culturally sensitive indicators;
- Impact of literacy, non-formal education and adult learning;

== Sources ==
- Elfert, Maren (Ed.): Towards an Open Learning World: 50 Years UNESCO Institute for Education. Hamburg: UNESCO Institute for Education, 2002
