= Social literacy =

Literacy gained through social interactions

Social literacy, from the perspective of the social-cultural theory, is more than the ability to read and write, and more than mastering literacy skills. Children can learn literacy through social interaction between themselves and children and/or adults in or outside school. Adults can use books, games, toys, conversations, field trips, and stories to develop the literacy practices through fun.

Collaborative learning between schools, family, and community can help develop a child's literacy. In addition, given today's technical knowledge, adults can take into consideration how to use technology in the learning process and to employ it in teaching children how to read and write in a social context.

"Literacy practices and events are always situated in social, cultural, historical and political relationships and embedded in structures of power. Furthermore, literacy practices involve social regulation of text, i.e. who has access to it and who can produce it, and such practices are purposeful and embedded in broader social goals and cultural practices. Moreover, these practices change and new ones are frequently acquired through processes of informal learning and sense-making".

For those reasons, teachers can design multiple levels of literacy activities and practices to fit different students' abilities and way of learning and "provide a pedagogical approach which fosters communities of learners, plan classroom activities that embed meaningful opportunities to engage in the analysis and construction of multimodal texts, and utilize teaching approaches that move beyond the false tension between abstracting the codes of language and learning their application for meaningful purposes".
