= International Literacy Foundation =

- Founded: 2010
- Founder: (United Kingdom) Moaad Taufik (United Kingdom) Batool Taufik (Lebanon) (Germany) Oliver Muller
- Type: Charity
- Purpose: Alleviating illiteracy throughout the world
- Location(s): (United Kingdom) Liverpool (Canada) Toronto (United Arab Emirates) Dubai (United States) Washington, D.C.
- Origins: Dubai, United Arab Emirates
- Region served: Numerous
- Product: Educational tools, such as books and computers
- Method: Literacy-based projects; building, developing and expanding library facilities
- Website: ILFcharity.com

The International Literacy Foundation (ILF) is an independent, international nonprofit organisation, founded in 2010 with the aim of tackling illiteracy globally.

== Overview ==
The organisation has a mandate of alleviating illiteracy throughout the world. The core belief of the organisation and its affiliates is that literacy is the key to reducing poverty and therefore raising living standards around the world. It maintains a focus on individual causes, with the potential to make am impact on underprivileged groups and their quality of life.

The ILF seeks to meet these objectives through the administration of literacy-based projects, which is executed by the carrying out of several methods:

- Conducting presentations and seminars
- The donation of educational material, such as books and computer technology
- Developing and expanding library facilities

=== Mission statement ===
The mission of the ILF is based on its commitment to invest in initiatives encouraging and supporting literacy and education, with a primary focus on literacy, as well as making grants to other organisations supporting similar educational causes, including those in which members and volunteers are engaged. .

As the organisation has its roots in education, however, it has a firm belief in the power of volunteers to collaborate, creating human opportunity and exerting an impact on the quality of life of those who are less fortunate.

Funding provided will therefore target selected initiatives and activities that promote education through literacy.

A Global Literacy Primer can also be found on the website, highlighting additional information

== Individuals ==
Further information can be found on the website.

=== Co-founders ===
    - Moaad Taufik - primarily responsible for the onsite coordination and execution of international literacy projects, as well as coordinating volunteers and support work.
  - Oliver Muller - responsible for public relations and international fundraising, mainly in Europe and the Middle East
  - Batool Taufik - responsible for public relations and international fundraising, mainly in the United Kingdom and Western Europe; also responsible for implementing knowledge in selection of materials used in construction of facilities to maintain economic efficiency, via engineering background

=== Directors ===
- Dr. Abdulmagid Taufik - based in Liverpool, primarily responsible for establishing the strategic direction of the organisation as well as sourcing literacy-based projects worldwide, specifically in Europe.
- Kia Brown-Dudley - President of the Board of Directors. She is also the Director of Programs and Partnership for the Educational Partners. In this position, she is responsible for working closely with financiers in order to insure the ILF's mission towards educational literacy. Kia became acting president of the board in 2023.
- J. Helen Perkins - Vice President. Perkins has been the acting vice president since 2023. Notable work within the organization includes coediting The Reading Teacher. Perkins also wrote the Standards for the Preparation of Literacy Professionals 2017.

=== Volunteers ===
Below are a list of countries in which volunteers for the ILF are working:

- Bahrain
- Canada
- China
- Egypt
- Jordan
- Lebanon
- Nigeria
- Pakistan
- Turkey
- United Kingdom
  - Scotland
  - England
- United States of America
- United Arab Emirates
- Yemen
- Zambia
- Zimbabwe

== Projects ==
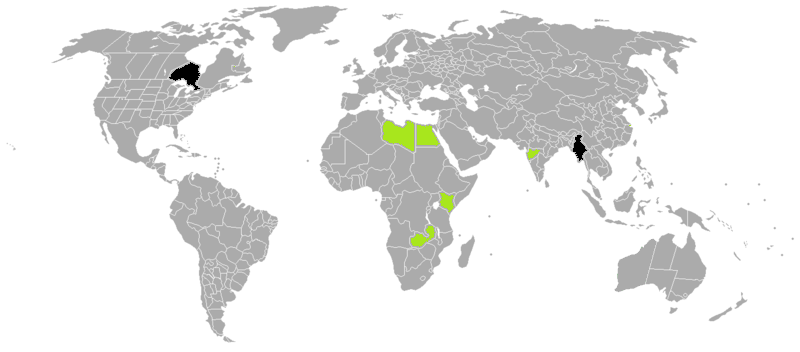

On the map above, completed projects are shaded in black while pipeline projects are shaded in green

- January, 2011 Toronto, Canada: debut project completed at the First Nations School of Toronto (FNST); workshops conducted and presentations held to support the Aboriginal community in North America. Over $2,500 raised, going towards the purchase of hundreds of books and other educational materials.
- February, 2011 Karachi, Pakistan: second project completed at the NGO sponsored Hope School in the Kurungi area of Karachi. Work carried out to convert an empty room at the school into a fully functional library (named the Bushra Khan Memorial Library, in commemoration of the highly regarded Pakistani/Canadian scholar Bushra Khan), providing over 600 books in numerous languages and two new computers with internet capabilities and a host of educational software.
- April, 2011 Nairobi, Kenya: third project completed at the By Grace Children's Home, a children's home for orphans, with 63 orphans aged 3–18; some were HIV positive. Situated in the Ngong district of the Kenyan capital Nairobi. Taufik visited, and converted an old room into a colourful library containing over 500 books and 2 PCs with access to the internet. The library was named the Salma Bishty Memorial Library, after a woman who actively encouraged literacy and the attainment of knowledge through literature.

=== Pipeline projects ===
As well as the two projects already completed thus far (as of March 27, 2011), the organisation has already highlighted several new locations in its tireless efforts to tackle the serious problem of illiteracy; these include:

- Lusaka, Zambia
- Shanghai, China
- Cairo, Egypt
- Zawiya, Libya
- Mumbai, India

== Corporate sponsors ==
The ILF has collaborated with corporate sponsors, who help facilitate its international literacy projects. These organisations include the following, among others:

- Taufik Medicals Ltd
