= Teachability Hypothesis =

The Teachability Hypothesis was produced by Manfred Pienemann. It was originally extracted from Pienemann's Processibility model. It proposes that learners will acquire a second language (L2) features if what is being taught is relatively close to their stage in language development.

== Description ==
The Teachability Hypothesis is based on previous psycholinguistic research in second language acquisition done by Meisel, Clahsen, and Pienemann (1981) and is reflective in Pienemann's Processibility theory. The hypothesis reports that some aspects of language are sequenced in a way that follows the developmental levels of language in which Pienemann coined those these features as 'developmental'. This sequence is reflective of the natural stages that learners will go through when learning a second language. Pienemann (1984) emphasizes that teachability of L2 structures have psychological constraints are universally shared. Language sequences have been reflected in wh-questions, some grammatical morphemes, negation, possessive determiners, and relative clause. Other features that do not have a developmental level of acquisition and can be acquired at any point in time Pienemann called 'variational' features. Pienemann (1981) concludes that formal instruction needs to be directed towards the ‘natural’ process of second language acquisition.

In Pienemann's (1984, 1998) study, he predicted that by following the natural order hypothesis, learners must pass through a set sequence of stages when acquiring language features. However, the instruction is only effective if the learners' interlanguage is close to the step of acquiring that structure Pienemann (1984, 1989, 1998). In addition to following natural acquisition order Pienemann (2013) argued that natural order of acquisition is unbeatable. Thus, instruction cannot make a learner to skip a stage. This means that a learner who is classified at stage 2 in a specific language feature will not benefit from instruction that is directed at learners who are at stage 4. Although, learners who are at stage 3 in a specific language feature may benefit from instruction that is directed at learners who are at stage 4. The reasoning for this is based on the learner's readiness.

=== Implications: Readiness ===
A barrier that the teachability Hypothesis mentions that can prevent the natural development of language acquisition is 'readiness'. Second language learners will not develop and progress through the same stages at the same time. This means that a learner's readiness refers to when a learner is able to move on to the next stage in the sequence of a particular language. The teachability Hypothesis has been used by second language researchers to understand student readiness in acquiring specific linguistic abilities.

== Importance ==
=== Second language education ===
The teachability hypothesis provides reasoning for the varied rate at which second languages are acquired. This hypothesis allows educational professionals such as, second language instructors to gain a sense of reasoning as to why their learners may or may not be succeeding as rapidly as their peers. It also documents the importance of teaching to a certain developmental level rather than a standard level or to age. Educational professionals can apply Pienemann's (1988) conclusion of second language learning to their lessons by designing targeted instructions to be conscientious towards student readiness for the outcome of the target learning to be successful.

=== Second language acquisition research ===
The Teachability Hypothesis is important to the framework of psycholinguistic theories as it examines the reasoning as to why learners linguistic capabilities may not be developing at the same rate as other learners. In addition, Second language researches have been studying issues around language pedagogy. Common issues in which the Teachability Hypothesis has provided an explanation is whether and to what degree instruction helps in second language acquisition. Second language acquisition researchers will often position themselves on a scale of the importance of instruction and innate learning. There are four main positions (1) interface position, (2) Variability Hypothesis, (3) Weak Interface Position, and (4) the Teachability Hypothesis. The Teachability Hypothesis favours teaching according to natural development, it has supported second/foreign language pedagogies teaching approaches such as the Learning-Centered approach. It has also supported classroom structure, instruction time, and use of first language in the classroom. Through these perspectives on language acquisition, second language processing can be understood.

== Supporting research ==
Supporting research for the Teachability Hypothesis
Author	Date	Description	Results
Krashen's Input Hypothesis	1970-1980s	Learners input knowledge of the language when they are being taught at a level that is one above their current ability. The input of this level is called "i+1". 'i' refers to the learners internal language and '1' is the stage of acquisition that learners will input.	
Pienemann	1988	Investigated whether instruction permits learned to skip a stage in the natural order of development through instruction.	Learners can not skip steps when learning developmental features until they are ready.
Mackay & Phillip	1998	Studied whether adult learners who are at different developmental stages could progress their formation of questions if instruction used recast as a method of corrective feedback.	Only learners who were ready and received recasts showed an excel in the production of question forms.
Mackay	1999	Can negative interaction in second language learning elicit second language grammatical development	Learners need active participation in social interaction at the developmental level of the learner.
Spada & Lightbown	1999	Explored the acquisition of questions based on learner readiness	Length of instruction has an effect on learners’ developmental readiness. However, First language may interfere with learners’ readiness.
McDonough	2005	Investigated the impact of negative feedback in Thai English as a second language learners by examining question development.	Advanced question forms produced by the learner and test scores shows that learners will increase the stage over a long period of time.
Kim	2012	Examined if increasing the level of complexity in a task will promote greater interaction, feedback by comparing Korean university students in an English and a second-language class. If this is true, will it contribute to second language (L2) development.	The higher the task was in terms complexity, the greater number of Language-Related Episodes (LREs) which strengthened question structures and language development.

== Comparing teaching approaches to the Teachability Hypothesis ==
	Name of Supporter	Description	Is Feedback Required	Does it Require the use of Authentic Material	The way Suggested for Learning
Teachability Hypothesis	Manfred Pienemann	Learners must go through the developmental stages of language learning. Language learning would not be successful if learners immediately enter a high stage of language learning. This means that learners must not skip steps but achieve them one by one.	Sometimes (explicitly)	no	Activities suitable to different learning stages
Audio-lingual Approach	Robert Lado	Response to the grammar-translation approach. In order for language learners to learn, they have to verbally practice the language. Moreover, the language that the learners must use is not in a naturalistic setting with focus on grammar. It is argued that learners have to jump right into the advanced stage and get it right from the beginning.	Always	no	Repetition
Comprehension-Based Instruction	Steven Krashen	Learners do not have to practice the language, they just have to get to a point where they could comprehend it. Moreover, the focus is mainly on comprehension and receiving meaning input like reading and listening tasks.	Never	yes	Activities concerned with comprehension more than form
Task-based Language Teaching	Michael Long	Meaning is the most important to focus on when learning a language. Tasks should be related to the real world and should only focus on form that only the teacher knows when learners are doing a task. Learners get assessed with form after the task is done. It focuses on a balance between the input and output of the language.	Sometimes (Implicitly)	yes	Task-associated with real-life usage of language and focused on meaning.
Immersion-Content-Based Instruction	Merril Swain	Language depends on the content the learners are learning. The main focus in class is learning the content delivered using a language, not learning the language itself.	Sometimes (implicitly)	mostly	Activities that mixes content with language
Form-Focused Instruction	Patsy Lightbown	Teach with respect to the learners language development, however, small aspects of language are not always taught explicitly. The main focus is on the overall view of language learning.	Sometimes (explicitly)	mostly	Activities similar to task
