= Interface position =

Second language acquisition concept

The interface position is a concept in second language acquisition that describes the various possible theoretical relationships between implicit and explicit knowledge in the mind of a second language learner. Tacit knowledge is language knowledge that learners possess intuitively but are not able to put into words; explicit knowledge is language knowledge that learners possess and are also able to verbalize. For example, native speakers of Spanish intuitively know how to conjugate verbs (implicit knowledge), but may be unable to articulate how these grammatical rules work. Conversely, a non-native student of Spanish may be able to explain how Spanish verbs are conjugated (explicit knowledge), but may not yet be able to use these verbs in naturalistic, fluent speech. The nature of the relationship between these two types of knowledge in second language learners has received considerable attention in second language acquisition research.

There are three basic positions in the interface position: the no-interface position, the strong-interface position, and various weak-interface positions. The no-interface position states that there is no relationship between these two types of knowledge; in other words, knowledge that has been learned explicitly can never become fast, automatic language knowledge. This position has been largely discredited, and the debate has now focused on the strong- and weak-interface positions. The strong-interface position states that explicit language knowledge can always become implicit language knowledge, and that such knowledge becomes implicit through repeated practice. This position is most often associated with skill-building theories of second language acquisition. The weak-interface positions state that explicit language knowledge can become implicit to some extent, but that these are limited by various developmental factors.

== Positions ==
=== Non-interface position ===
The non-interface position states that there is an absolute separation of implicit and explicit language knowledge inside speakers' minds. In this view, it would be possible to have implicit and explicit knowledge about the same language features without them being connected in any way. This view is most commonly associated with Stephen Krashen and his acquisition/learning hypothesis, one of the five hypotheses often known together as the input hypothesis. Krashen's views have been criticised by other second language acquisition researchers for their lack of falsifiability, amongst other things.

=== Strong-interface position ===
The strong-interface position views language learning much the same as any other kind of learning. In this view, all kinds of learning follow the same sequence, from declarative knowledge (explicit knowledge about the thing to be learned), to procedural knowledge (knowledge of how the thing is done), and finally to automatization of this procedural knowledge. Learners move from one stage of knowledge to the next by practice. This position is most often associated with Robert DeKeyser.

=== Weak-interface positions ===
There is no one single weak-interface position; rather, "weak-interface" is a way of categorizing positions that fall somewhere in the continuum between no-interface and strong-interface. Rod Ellis's weak interface model says that developmental features of language such as third person -s can be converted into implicit knowledge only if the learner is at the correct developmental stage for that feature. Variational features such as the copula be, however, can be converted into implicit knowledge at any time. Nick Ellis also takes a weak-interface position, in which both implicit and explicit knowledge can work together cooperatively, with implicit knowledge being the most important for learning. In his view this cooperation is true for any learning task, language-based or not. Nick Ellis's position differs from Rod Ellis's in that he argues that explicit knowledge cannot become implicit knowledge, although both theories posit an indirect role for explicit knowledge in developing an implicit knowledge system.

== Studies ==
These arguments remain mostly theoretical in nature; however, there has been one study with the direct aim of clarifying the interface hypothesis, performed by DeKeyser in 1995. DeKeyser used an artificial language, in which learners were given form-focused instruction. One group were given explicit-deductive instruction and the other group were given implicit-deductive instruction. Learners were judged on their ability to use the rules by a computerized judgement test and a computerized production task. The results of these tests showed that the explicit-deductive group clearly did better than the implicit-deductive group at learning the grammar of the artificial language, although Ellis points out that it isn't clear how much opportunity learners had to use their explicit knowledge in the production task, a fact which DeKeyser himself also admitted.

== See also ==
- Double bind, an emotionally distressing dilemma in communication
