= Lightbown =

Lightbown is an English surname. Notable people with the surname include:

- David Lightbown (1932–1995), British politician
- Grant Lightbown, New Zealand footballer
- Patsy M. Lightbown (born 1944), American applied linguist
- Ronald Lightbown (1932–2011), British art historian and curator

== See also ==
- Lightbown Aspinall, English wallpaper manufacturing company
- Lightbound
