= Mike Sharwood Smith =

Michael "Mike" Sharwood Smith (born 1942), Emeritus Professor of Languages at Heriot-Watt University & Honorary Professorial Fellow at the University of Edinburgh, is a researcher into multilingualism and the acquisition of non-native languages, a branch of developmental linguistics and cognitive science. He is a founding editor of Second Language Research, successor to the Interlanguage Studies Bulletin.

Together with John Truscott of National Tsing Hua University, Taiwan he has developed a new theoretical platform for studying language development and language use called the MOGUL Framework (Modular Growth and Use of Language) which explains language development as a by-product of processing albeit constrained by the modular architecture of the mind. His research interests have included theoretical issues concerning the way in which second languages are represented in the mind and how they interact, language attrition, the role of consciousness in language learning and also applications of linguistics such as the design of pedagogical grammars. He has introduced various concepts and associated terms into the field of second language acquisition research, notably "grammatical consciousness-raising" (Sharwood Smith 1981), "crosslinguistic influence" (Sharwood Smith 1982) and "input enhancement" (Sharwood Smith 1991), the last-mentioned idea focusing on the supposed learning effect of systematically making salient for learners certain specific linguistic features that are present in the language to which they are exposed. In line with the frameworks relevance to the mind in general and not just language, the MOGUL framework was accordingly renamed the Modular Cognition Framework (MCF) in 2018 and its particular applications to language were thenceforth viewed as part of the MOGUL 'Project'. The MCF covers all aspects of cognition (Sharwood Smith 2019). Together with James Pankhurst, he ran the annual LARS (Language Acquisition Research Symposia) meetings in Utrecht between 1983 and 1998, bringing together researchers in first and second language acquisition and also theoretical linguistics. Speakers at the LARS meetings have included leading figures such as Melissa Bowerman, Ray Jackendoff, Annette Karmiloff-Smith, Mary-Louise Kean, Brian MacWhinney, Frederick Newmeyer, Steven Pinker and Deirdre Wilson as well as many prominent researchers in second language acquisition.

== Bibliography ==
- Sharwood Smith, M (1980). "Strategies, language transfer and the simulation of learners' mental operations". In Language Learning 29:2, 345 – 361.
- Sharwood Smith, M (1981). "Consciousness-raising and the second language learner". In Applied Linguistics 2:2, 159 – 168.
- Sharwood Smith, M (1982). "Crosslinguistic aspects of second language acquisition". In Applied Linguistics 4:3, 192 – 199.
- Sharwood Smith, M (1991). "Speaking to many minds: On the relevance of different types of language information for the L2 learner". In Second Language Research, 7 (2), 118–132.
- Escudero, P. & Sharwood Smith, M.A. (2001). Reinventing the native speaker or 'what you never wanted to know about the native speaker so never dared to ask' in S. Foster-Cohen and A. Nizegorodcew (Eds.). EUROSLA Yearbook Vol 1. John Benjamins: Amsterdam.
- Truscott, J and M. Sharwood Smith (2004). "Acquisition by processing: a modular perspective on language development". In Bilingualism: Language and Cognition 7,2: 1–20.
- Truscott, J and M. Sharwood Smith (2004). How APT is your theory: present status and future prospects. Bilingualism: Language and Cognition 7,2: 43–47.
- Sharwood Smith, M (2004). In two minds about grammar: On the interaction of linguistic and metalinguistic knowledge in performance. Transactions of the Philological Society, 102,3: 255–280.
- Sharwood Smith M. and J. Truscott (2005). "Stages or Continua in Second Language Acquisition: A Mogul Solution". In Applied Linguistics 22,2: 219–240.
- Sharwood-Smith, G, Sharwood Smith. M. and Perry R (2005). Response to Webster and Greive, R. 'Transient fixation on a non-native language associated with anaesthesia'. Anaesthesia 2005, 60: 712–713.
- Sharwood Smith M. and J. Truscott. 'Stages or Continua in Second Language Acquisition': A Mogul Solution' in Applied Linguistics 22,2: 219–240.
- Sharwood Smith M. and J. Truscott (2006). 'Full Transfer, Full Access: a Processing Oriented Interpretation'. In Unsworth, S., T. Parodi, A. Sorace and M. Young-Scholten. Paths of Development in L1 and L2 acquisition. Amsterdam: John Benjamins 201–206.
- Sharwood Smith. M (2007). "Language Attrition By Processing: A MOGUL account". In Köpke, B., Schmid, M., S., Keijzer, Me.& Dostert, S.(Eds.). Language Attrition: Theoretical perspectives. Amsterdam. John Benjamins, 39–52.
- Sharwood Smith. M (2007). 'Morphological and syntactic awareness in foreign/second language learning'. In Cenoz, J. & Hornberger, N. (2007). Encyclopedia of Language and Education, 2nd edition, Vol 6. Knowledge about Language. Dordrecht: Kluwer Academic publishers:179–192.
- Sharwood Smith, M (2007) Revisiting the role of consciousness with MOGUL. In Han, Z. (Ed). Understanding Second Language Processes. Clevedon: Multilingual Matters: 1–15.
- Sharwood Smith, M & Truscott, J (2008). MOGUL and Crosslinguistic Influence. In Gabrys, D. (Ed.) Morphosyntactic Issues in Second Language Acquisition Studies, Clevedon: Multilingual Matters: 63–85 ISBN 978-1-84769-065-4 (hbk).
- Sharwood Smith, M & J. Truscott. (2014). The multilingual mind: a modular processing perspective. Cambridge: Cambridge University Press.
- Sharwood Smith, M. (2017). Active-passive bilingualism and functional distance between L1 and L2 explained within a unified cognitive perspective . In Ardila, A., Cieślicka, A., Heredia, R. & Rosselli, R. (Eds.). Psychology of Bilingualism: The Cognitive World of Bilinguals (pp 157–185). Berlin: Springer Verlag.
- Sharwood Smith (2019). The compatibility within a modular framework of emergent and dynamical processes in mind and brain. Journal of Neurolinguistics.
