= Dictogloss =

Dictogloss, also known as grammar dictation, is a language teaching technique that is used to teach grammatical structures in which students form small groups and summarize a target-language text.

== Overview ==
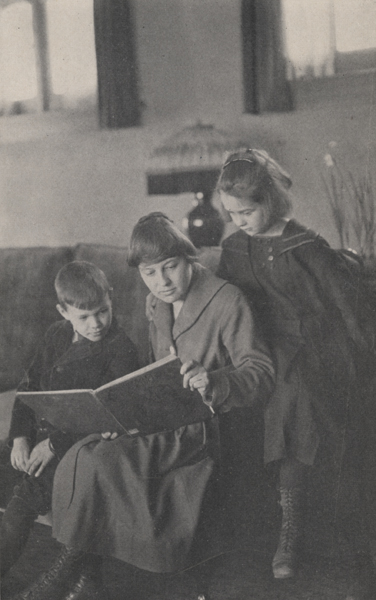
A dictogloss typically begins with a teacher reading a text to a group of students

First, the teacher prepares a text that contains examples of the grammatical form to be studied. The teacher reads the text to the students at normal speed while they take notes. Students then work in small groups to prepare a summary of their work using the correct grammatical structures. Finally, each group presents their work to the rest of the class. Dictogloss activities encourage learners to focus on the form of their language while also being based in communication, and are used in task-based language teaching.

== Positives ==
Dictogloss activities integrate the three language skills: listening, reading, and writing. They also give students opportunities to talk about both content and the language itself. Furthermore, dictogloss activities are a useful way of presenting new factual information to students and encourage them to listen for key points. Finally, they give support to less confident students, as they are encouraged to participate in their groups as part of the structure of the activity.

The original dictogloss method, introduced by Ruth Wajnryb, was developed with the intention of being a tool for enhancing grammar. It consists of a preparation, dictation, reconstruction, and analysis/correction. Before the text is read, students complete introductory work on relevant vocabulary to familiarize themselves with the subject. The instructor reads the text aloud twice to provide opportunities for careful listening and note-taking. The rest of the process is entirely collaborative: first, students work together in groups to reconstruct the text using shared notes, then the result is compared with other groups to reach a consensus.

Students benefit from the interactivity of dictogloss activities. Rather than being lectured to and studying independently, dictogloss activities allow students to identify their struggles with learning a language, which an instructor can then address instead of focusing on areas which may not need additional support.

Listening skills can be developed using dictogloss activities; their utility is not limited to grammatical features. Listening to the dictogloss material is a form of direct meaning comprehension as opposed to inferred meaning comprehension. The uninterrupted speech of the dictogloss activity is better suited to real-life situations like lectures or films than spontaneous dialogues.

Dictogloss activities can be adapted to fit different needs, such as focusing on genre-specific features of a text. Students are better able to emulate the appropriate conventions and style of genres like newsletters when dictogloss techniques are applied to language learning. Specific genre conventions that improve with the addition of dictogloss activities are students' implementation of subheadings, topic sentences, and more deliberate paragraph structure. Style conventions used to address the audience also see improvements, including pronouns use and formal language.
