= Acquired language =

Acquired language may refer to:

- Language acquisition, the process of acquiring language
- Second language, a language that is learnt after a native language
- Second-language acquisition, the process of acquiring a second language
