= Acculturation model =

Second-language acquisition theory

In second-language acquisition, the acculturation model is a theory proposed by John Schumann to describe the acquisition process of a second language (L2) by members of ethnic minorities that typically include immigrants, migrant workers, or the children of such groups. This acquisition process takes place in natural contexts of majority language settings. The main suggestion of the theory is that the acquisition of a second language is directly linked to the acculturation process, and successes are determined by the extent to which they can orient themselves to the target language culture.

== Background ==
The acculturation model came into light with Schumann's study of six non-English learners where one learner, named Alberto, unlike the other five, had little progress in the acquisition process of English.

== Description ==
The process of acculturation was defined by H. Douglas Brown as "the process of being adapted to a new culture" which involves a new orientation of thinking and feeling on the part of an L2 learner. According to Douglas, as culture is an integral part of a human being, the process of acculturation takes a deeper turn when the issue of language is brought on the scene. Schumann based his acculturation model on two sets of factors: social and psychological. Schumann asserts that the degree to which the second-language learners acculturate themselves towards the culture of the target-language (TL) group generally depends on social and psychological factors; and these two sorts of factors will determine respectively the level of social distance and psychological distance an L2 learner is having in the course of their learning the target-language.

Social distance, as Rod Ellis notes, concerns the extent to which individual learners can identify themselves with members of the TL group and, thereby, can achieve contact with them. Schumann identifies eight factors that influence social distance:

1. Social dominance
2. Integration pattern
3. Enclosure
4. Cohesiveness
5. Size factor
6. Cultural congruence
7. Attitude factor
8. Intended length of residence.

Psychological distance is the extent to which individual learners are at ease with their target-language learning task. Schumann identified three factors that influence psychological distance:

1. Motivation
2. Attitude
3. Culture shock

Schumann later sought to extend the acculturation model by assessing contemporary cognitive models for second language acquisition, including Barry McLaughlin’s cognitive theory, Evelyn Hatch and B. Hawkins’ experiential approach, Ellen Bialystok and Ellen Bouchard Ryan’s model of knowledge and control dimensions, John R. Anderson’s active control of thought framework, and Michael Gasser's connectionist lexical memory framework.
