= Processability theory =

Linguistic framework

Processability theory is a theory of second language acquisition developed by Manfred Pienemann. (Pienemann 1998) The theory has been used as a framework by scientists from Europe, North America, Asia and Australia.

Processability theory (PT) is a cognitive approach to second language acquisition that seeks to explain developmental schedules as well as learner variation. It is based on Levelt’s (1989) approach to language generation and is formally operationalized using Lexical-Functional Grammar (Bresnan 2001). PT’s core assumption is that learners can produce only what they can process. PT is therefore based on the architecture of human language generation that is constructed hierarchically. It is argued that learners are constrained to follow that hierarchical order of processability in acquiring any target language. In other words, the hierarchy of processability is the core of the predictive machinery entailed in PT. Of course, the hierarchy must be applied to the specific conditions of any target language. This is done using LFG formalisms. When applied to ESL, this results in an array of predictions for developmental schedules in syntax and morphology. For instance, word order is predicted to be initially constrained to canonical word order even in questions, as Do-support and auxiliary inversion would require processing resources that are not initially available.

PT also includes theoretical modules dealing with L1 transfer, inter-learner variation and the role of linguistic typology. It comes with detailed methodological tools. PT has been applied to second language classrooms and to linguistic profiling.

== Commentary ==
Processability Theory is now a mature theory of grammatical development of learners' interlanguage. It is cognitively founded (hence applicable to any language), formal and explicit (hence empirically testable), and extended, having not only formulated and tested hypotheses about morphology, syntax and discourse-pragmatics, but having also paved the way for further developments at the interface between grammar and the lexicon and other important modules in SLA.

Among the most important SLA theories recently discussed in Van Patten (2007), no other can accommodate such a variety of phenomena or seems able to offer the basis for so many new directions. Ten years have gone by since Pienemann’s first book-length publication on PT in 1998; and before that, it took almost two decades to mould into PT the initial intuition by the ZISA team that the staged development of German word order could be explained by psycholinguistic constraints universally applicable to all languages (Pienemann 1981; Clahsen, Meisel & Pienemann 1983). In these three decades, the whole field of SLA has grown exponentially. PT has paralleled this growth, and widened its scope in several directions. First, ZISA’s intuitions have been applied to English (Pienemann & Johnston 1984; Pienemann, Johnston & Brindley 1988, Pienemann 1989), then PT has expanded its typological validation from German and English to different languages, such as Swedish and other Scandinavian languages (Håkansson 1997, Glahn et al. 2001), Arabic (e.g., Mansouri 1995; 2005), Italian (e.g. Di Biase & Kawaguchi 2002; Di Biase 2007; Bettoni, Di Biase & Nuzzo 2009), French (Ågren 2009), Chinese (e.g. Zhang 2004, 2005), and Japanese (e.g. Di Biase & Kawaguchi 2002, 2005).

Secondly, PT’s framework has been substantially widened by including Bresnan’s (2001) Lexical Mapping Theory, and thus adding a discourse pragmatically motivated syntactic component (Pienemann, Di Biase & Kawaguchi 2005) to its first syntactically motivated morphological module. Thirdly, developmentally-moderated transfer from L1 (e.g., Pienemann, Di Biase, Kawaguchi & Håkansson 2005a; Pienemann, Di Biase, Kawaguchi & Håkansson 2005b). Fourthly, PT’s plausibility has been tested in language situations other than L2 ones, such as monolingual and bilingual language acquisition (e.g., Håkansson 2001, 2005; ItaniAdams 2006), among children with Specific Language Impairment (e.g., Håkansson 2001; 2005), and in the origins of creole languages (Plag 2008a, 2008b).

Finally, the range of the original applications of PT to language testing and language teaching has also expanded over the years, involving several new ways of testing and teaching situations (e.g., Iwasaki 2004, 2008, ask Bruno; Pienemann & Keßler 2007), and new languages (e.g. Di Biase 2008; Yamaguchi 2009). Ensuing publications in all these PT strands during such a long period of growth have had their own agendas and purposes. Furthermore, not only PT itself but also its feeder disciplines have developed in new directions, crucially among them psycholinguistics for language production and theoretical linguistics for language knowledge. As a consequence, it is not surprising that readers unfamiliar with PT's history may at times be confused by differences in the presentation of the theory, its use of terminology, and reliance on its theoretical bases.
