= Implicit and explicit knowledge =

Types of linguistic knowledge

Implicit and explicit knowledge are two contrasting types of knowledge often discussed in the field of second language acquisition (SLA). Implicit knowledge refers to the unconscious, intuitive knowledge that learners develop through meaningful exposure and use of a language. In contrast, explicit knowledge involves conscious understanding of language rules, often acquired through formal instruction or study. A somewhat similar distinction is the one between procedural knowledge and declarative knowledge. The declarative/procedural framework focuses on memory systems—how knowledge is stored and utilized—where declarative memory typically aligns with explicit knowledge and procedural memory with implicit knowledge. However, the two frameworks are not entirely interchangeable.

These two forms of knowledge have been the subject of extensive debate among linguists, language teachers, and researchers seeking to understand how best to facilitate language learning. The debate touches on how each type of knowledge is acquired, how they interact, and the degree to which explicit instruction can foster implicit knowledge.

== Definitions ==
=== Implicit knowledge ===
Implicit knowledge is generally described as knowledge acquired without conscious awareness of what has been learned. It is often learned incidentally while engaging in communicative activities, such as conversation or reading. Learners with implicit knowledge can use language fluently and spontaneously but may not be able to articulate the rules behind their performance.

=== Explicit knowledge ===
Explicit knowledge refers to the conscious awareness of language rules and structures. Learners gain explicit knowledge through direct instruction, studying grammar explanations, or engaging in metalinguistic discussions. Unlike implicit knowledge, explicit knowledge can be verbalized. For example, a learner might state that the third-person singular in English requires an "-s" ending on the verb, even if they do not always produce it correctly in spontaneous speech.

== Historical background ==
Early SLA researchers, such as Stephen Krashen, drew a strong distinction between conscious language learning and subconscious language acquisition. Krashen argued that conscious learning (akin to explicit knowledge) is less effective in developing true linguistic competence. However, subsequent scholars, including Rod Ellis and others, have investigated how explicit learning can support or facilitate the development of implicit knowledge.

Krashen's Input hypothesis posits that learners acquire language primarily through exposure to comprehensible input, leading to the development of an implicit linguistic system. Krashen claimed that the role of conscious learning is minor, mainly helping learners monitor their output rather than acquire new rules. This viewpoint has influenced debates around how much direct grammar instruction is beneficial. Ellen Bialystok was also one of the first researchers to formally propose a distinction between implicit and explicit linguistic knowledge. Bialystok's distinction was motivated by practical concerns in SLA research, particularly the need to explain the differential success of learners in achieving fluent and accurate performance in a second language. She emphasized that implicit knowledge underpins fluent communication, while explicit knowledge plays a secondary, monitoring role.

Rod Ellis significantly advanced the study of implicit and explicit knowledge in SLA through a systematic psychometric approach aimed at operationalizing and validating these constructs. Ellis emphasized the critical need for reliable measures to distinguish between the two types of knowledge, arguing that much of SLA research suffered from theoretical ambiguity and methodological challenges related to measurement.

To address these issues, Ellis designed a battery of five tests to separately measure implicit and explicit linguistic knowledge:

- Imitation test – Participants repeated sentences that included grammatical and ungrammatical structures, focusing on fluency and meaning.
- Oral narrative test – Learners retold a story, encouraging spontaneous use of target grammatical structures.
- Timed grammaticality judgment test (GJT) – A test that required learners to quickly judge the grammaticality of sentences under time pressure, designed to tap into implicit knowledge.
- Untimed grammaticality judgment test – Similar to the timed GJT but without time pressure, encouraging explicit reflection.
- Metalinguistic knowledge test – A test requiring learners to explicitly explain grammatical rules and identify grammatical structures in texts.

Ellis's principal component factor analysis revealed that scores from the imitation test, oral narrative test, and timed GJT loaded on one factor, interpreted as measuring implicit knowledge. Meanwhile, scores from the untimed GJT and metalinguistic test loaded on a second factor, representing explicit knowledge.

John Williams and Patrick Rebuschat further advanced the study of implicit and explicit knowledge by focusing on the role of awareness in language learning. Williams explored how implicit learning occurs in controlled experimental settings, often using artificial grammars to investigate whether learners acquire linguistic patterns without conscious awareness. His studies provided evidence that learners can implicitly acquire linguistic patterns even in the absence of explicit instruction. Rebuschat extended this line of inquiry by developing methods to measure awareness during learning tasks. Rebuschat and colleagues introduced tools such as subjective measures of confidence and retrospective verbal reports to distinguish between knowledge that learners are consciously aware of and knowledge that remains implicit. His work highlighted the methodological challenges of disentangling these two types of knowledge and emphasized the need for triangulating evidence from multiple sources.

== Interface positions ==
In SLA, there are various "interface" positions concerning how implicit and explicit knowledge relate to each other:

=== Strong interface position ===
The strong interface hypothesis posits that explicit knowledge can transform into implicit knowledge through extensive practice and proceduralization. This view emphasizes that deliberate practice in structured learning environments can automate explicit rules, rendering them accessible for fluent and unconscious use in communication.

=== No interface position ===
The no interface hypothesis, closely associated with Krashen's distinction between learning and acquisition, argues that implicit and explicit knowledge are fundamentally distinct systems. According to this perspective, explicit knowledge cannot be transformed into implicit knowledge. Instead, implicit knowledge is developed solely through exposure to comprehensible input in naturalistic settings.

=== Weak interface position ===
The weak interface hypothesis suggests that explicit knowledge can aid the development of implicit knowledge under certain conditions, such as when learners consciously notice a gap between their interlanguage and target language norms. This view draws upon Schmidt's noticing hypothesis, which highlights the role of awareness in bridging explicit learning and implicit acquisition.

=== Current debate ===
However, recent findings highlight that the Interface Problem cannot be fully understood solely through the traditional question of whether explicit knowledge transforms into implicit knowledge. For instance, N. Ellis (2005) argues that conscious attention and explicit knowledge facilitate the development of pattern recognition abilities, which serve as a foundation for implicit learning. Subsequently, implicit learning integrates and refines these abilities, creating a dynamic interaction that evolves over time.

Additionally, Dienes and Perner (2001) and Williams (2005) suggest that learners' unconscious implicit knowledge can later trigger conscious noticing and the formation of explicit rules. Meanwhile, Rebuschat and Williams (2012) argue that statistical learning underpins implicit knowledge, which, in turn, supports learners in constructing explicit rules and metalinguistic knowledge.

== Implications for teaching ==
The debate surrounding implicit and explicit knowledge has important implications for language pedagogy. Some researchers propose an integrated approach, balancing meaningful input-based instruction with carefully timed explicit feedback on form. Others suggest that purely communicative, implicit-focused instruction is sufficient for naturalistic acquisition.

Common pedagogical perspectives include:

- Focus-on-form instruction – Embeds explicit focus on grammar within a primarily communicative framework.
- Task-based language teaching (TBLT) – Emphasizes meaningful interaction to develop implicit knowledge while allowing for optional explicit focus on problematic forms.

== See also ==
- Task-based language learning
- Focus on form
