= Skill-based theories of second-language acquisition =

Skill-based theories of second-language acquisition are theories of second-language acquisition based on models of skill acquisition in cognitive psychology. These theories conceive of second-language acquisition as being learned in the same way as any other skill, such as learning to drive a car or play the piano. That is, they see practice as the key ingredient of language acquisition. The most well-known of these theories is based on John Anderson's adaptive control of thought model.

== Adaptive control of thought ==
The adaptive control of thought model assumes a distinction between declarative knowledge, knowledge that is conscious and consists of facts, and procedural knowledge, knowledge of how an activity is done. In this model, skill acquisition is seen as a progression from declarative to procedural knowledge. Adaptive control of thought is a general model of cognition, and second-language acquisition is just one application of a wide area of research in cognitive psychology. Second-language acquisition is seen as a progression through three stages, declarative, procedural, and autonomous.
