= Input enhancement =

Input enhancement (IE) is a concept in second language acquisition. Mike Sharwood Smith coined the term to cover techniques used by researchers to make salient selected features of a language for students such as word order, parts of words that express tense, agreement and number for example, accents, idioms and slang. These techniques aim to draw attention to aspects of a language that have hitherto seemed to have made insufficient impact on the learner. This need not necessarily involve making learners consciously aware of the researcher's or teacher's intentions. Although IE was conceived of as a research tool, the term can also be used to describe techniques deliberately or instinctively used in language teaching and also in the way parents (again instinctively) talk to their children as also the way people alter their speech when talking to non-native speakers who seem to have difficulty in communicating. IE may figure as a deliberate strategy in teaching methods but it has always been present implicitly in standard teaching practice.

== Techniques ==
IE techniques include:

- Avoiding vowel reduction typical of rapid or casual speech
- Slowing down the rate of speech
- Using exaggerated stress and intonation
- Extensive repetition of words and phrases
- Less pre-verbal and more post-verbal modification
- Use of gestures, text enhancement such as boldface
- Underlining and other attention-catching textural techniques such as boldface, uppercase letters, colour-coding, etc.

IE includes use of traditional techniques to teach grammar and usage. Sharwood Smith distinguishes external input enhancement from internal input enhancement with the former referring primarily to techniques used in the deliberate teaching of a language and the latter employing ordinary events or situations.

== Etymology ==
The term "input enhancement" was designed to replace the term 'grammatical consciousness-raising' (CR) because the older term did not allow for enhanced learning that occurs in a natural or accidental setting instead of an academic or purposefully educational setting.
