= Beginner's luck =

Unexpected success by a novice

Beginner's luck refers to the phenomenon of novices experiencing a disproportionate frequency of success or succeeding against an expert in a given activity. One would expect experts to outperform novices; when the opposite happens, it is counter-intuitive, hence the need for a term to describe this phenomenon. The term is most often used in reference to a first attempt in sport or gambling, but is also used in many other contexts. The term is also used when no skill whatsoever is involved, such as a first-time slot machine player winning the jackpot.

== See also ==
- Amateur
- Jinx
- Luck
- Mojo
- Odds
- Psychology
- Regression toward the mean
- Rookie
- Shoshin
- U-shaped development
