= Second-language attrition =

Language skill phenomenon

Second-language attrition refers to atrophy of second-language skills. It is commonly found in individuals who live in environments in which the presence of the attrited language is limited.

== Overview ==
It is common for people who have learned a foreign language to gradually forget much of the acquired language skills once the period of formal instruction is over. Thus, second language attrition refers to non-pathological declines in second language skills.

Beginning in the 1970s, a new and especially young field in the area of second-language acquisition was developed. It is connected cross-sectionally throughout different research areas. Language attrition, in general, is concerned with what is lost (linguistic focus), how it is lost (psycholinguistic and neurolinguistic focus) and why it is lost (sociolinguistic, sociologistic and anthropologistic focus) (Hansen 1999). Over 25 years research has been concentrated on studying the attrition of second languages. First studies, dealing with the topic of language loss or language attrition, were published in the late 1970s (de Bot & Weltens 1989: 127). In 1980, the University of Pennsylvania hosted the conference "The Loss of Language Skills", and language attrition was recognized as a field in the research of second-language acquisition. Since then, various scientific research papers – mainly within America – have been published. Later, several studies in Europe – especially the Netherlands – followed. In other countries, however, language attrition research was paid hardly any attention (de Bot & Weltens 1995). Compared to the field of second-language acquisition, language attrition is still relatively young; so much is still unknown.

=== Purpose and development ===
The purpose of language attrition research, in general, is to discover how, why and what is lost when a language is forgotten. The aim in foreign or second-language attrition research, more specifically, is to find out why, after an active learning process, the language competence changes or even stops (Gleason 1982). Further, results from research in this area could, as Van Els and Weltens (1989) counter, contribute to the understanding of relations between acquisition and attrition (van Els 1989). L2/FL attrition research is particularly important because it provides results for foreign language instruction. De Bot and Weltens state, "[r]esearch on language attrition can also have a considerable impact on curriculum planning or foreign language teaching" (1995: 152). The theoretical grounding of the language attrition research derives primarily from cognitive and psychological theories. Research in the area of language attrition concentrates generally on the loss of the L1 and L2. The first distinction that can be made is between pathological and natural language attrition. The former concentrates on language loss caused by a damage of the brain, injury, age or illness. However, this topic will not be investigated any further, because the language attrition in these cases is not caused by natural circumstances. Weltens (1987: 24) states another possible distinction, inter and intra generational language attrition. Inter generational language attrition is concerned with attrition within individuals, whereas intra generational language attrition concentrates on the attrition across different generations. Van Els (1986) distinguishes types of attrition in terms of which language is lost and in which environment it is being lost. Therefore, he classifies:

1. loss of L1 in L1 environment, e.g. dialect loss
2. loss of L1 in L2 environment, e.g. immigrants losing their mother tongue
3. loss of L2/FL in L1 environment, e.g. loss of foreign languages learned at school
4. loss of L2/FL in L2 environment, e.g. aging migrants losing their L2.

== Relationship between the first and second languages in the mind ==
It is not exactly known how different languages are stored in the mind. A researcher, Vivian Cook, proposes that the languages are separated into distinct compartments. This is termed the separation model. An L2 speaker will speak one of the languages, but no connection is made between them in the mind (Cook 2003: 7). Another proposed model is the integration model, which suggests that rather than having two separate mental lexicons, an L2 speaker has one lexicon where words from one language are stored from one language alongside words from the other. Regarding phonology, it has been found that L2 speakers sometimes have one merged system for producing speech, not distinguished by L1 or L2. The integration model focuses on how there is a balance between the unique elements of both languages, and how they form one system. Though these two proposed models offering different perspectives, it is impossible to have total separation because both languages exist in the same mind. Total integration is impossible because we are able to keep the languages apart in our minds (Cook 2003: 7). Another proposed model is the link language model. This model illustrates the idea that two languages within the same mind are able to influence and interact with one another. Further, the partial integration model illustrates the idea of partial overlapping between two languages in one mind. It doesn't differentiate between the languages in the overlap, but it shows how it functions as a single, conjoined system. These systems illustrate the point that vocabulary, syntax, and other aspects of language knowledge can be shared or overlapped between different languages within one mind (Cook 2003: 8). Finally, all of the models function together to create the integration continuum, an illustration that shows the possible relationships in "multi-competence" (Cook 2003: 9).

=== Effects on the L1 ===
The L1 can be enhanced by the use of an L2 - Cook mentions that "extensive research into bilingual development shows overall that L2 user children have more precocious metalinguistic skills than their monolingual pairs" (Cook 2003: 13).

The L1 can be harmed by the use of an L2 - He also brings up the risk of L1 language attrition from the L2. When one language is less and less used, certain abilities are lost from inactivity.

The L1 is different from the L2, without being better or worse - Oftentimes, the effects of the L2 on the L1 cause no difference in language knowledge or ability. Differences will undoubtedly exist in the first language element because of different linguistic organization. Different characteristics, like phonological properties, show noticeable differences from a speaker transitioning from L1 to L2. For example, Cook brings up the possibility of differences in "the first language of L2 users for plosive consonants such as /p/ and /b/ or /k/ and /g/ across pairs of languages such as Spanish/English, French/English, and Hebrew/English, which are essentially undetectable in normal language use" (Cook 2003: 13).

=== First language attrition ===
Researchers, Levy, McVeigh, Marful, and Anderson studied the idea of a new acquired language inhibiting the first, native language. They discussed how "travelers immersed in a new language often experience a surprising phenomenon: Words in their native tongue grow more difficult to recall over time" (Levy 2007: 29). They suggest that the lapses in native-language words can possibly be attributed to "an adaptive role of inhibitory control in hastening second-language acquisition" (Levy 2007: 29). First-language attrition is often worse during second-language immersion. During this time, the native-language is practiced infrequently. The attrition can be attributed to the disuse of the native language and functions of forgetting that occur in the mind. They bring up the idea that first-language attrition can be related to "retrieval-induced-forgetting." This is supported by how novice foreign-language speakers immediately access native-language vocabulary for things, although the foreign word is wanted. The aforementioned researchers conducted studies on retrieval-induced forgetting, and examined "whether inhibitory control mechanisms resolve interference from one's native language during foreign-language production" (Levy 2007: 30). The results of their experiments provided evidence for a role of inhibitions in first-language attrition. The experiment showed that "the more often novice Spanish speakers named objects in Spanish, the worse their later production of the corresponding English names became", "subjects who were least fluent with the Spanish vocabulary [they] test showed the largest phonological inhibition of English words", and showed that the inhibition effect was isolated to phonology (Levy 2007: 33).

== Theories of forgetting ==
To provide an answer as to how second-language attrition happens, it is necessary to have a glance at the findings of the research of memory. Since its establishment by Ebbinghaus in the late 19th century, the empirical research about learning still plays an important role in the modern research of memory.

=== Decay theory ===
Hermann Ebbinghaus contributed a lot to the research of the memory of the brain. He made the first empirical study concerning the function of the memory as to the storage and forgetting of information. His major finding was that the amount of learned knowledge depends on the amount of time invested. Further, the more time that is passing by, the more repetitions that are necessary. Resulting from the findings of Ebbinghaus, the first theory of forgetting was established, the decay theory. It says that if something new is learned, a memory trace is formed. This trace will decay, if not used in the course of time, and by decaying of this trace, forgetting occurs (Weltens 1987).

=== Interference theory ===
The interference theory can be seen as one of the most important theories of forgetting. It indicates that prior, posterior or new learning information compete with already existing ones and therefore forgetting occurs. This inhibition can be divided into two types: the retroactive inhibition, where information acquired at a later point in time blocks the information that was acquired earlier. Proactive inhibition means that information acquired in the past can infer with new information. Hence, a blocking can occur that inhibits the acquiring of the new target item (Ecke 2004: 325).

=== Retrieval-failure hypothesis ===
Today, the retrieval-failure hypothesis, concerning the function of the memory, is more widely accepted and popularized (Schöpper-Grabe 1998:237). It says that the storage of information happens on different levels. Therefore, information or memory is not deleted, but rather, the access to the current level is blocked. Thus, the information is not available. Hansen quotes Loftus & Loftus (1976) to describe forgetting: "[…] much like being unable to find something that we have misplaced somewhere" (1999: 10). Cohen states, evidence for knowing that a learner is not able to "find" something, is the use of the so-called progressive retrieval (1986). Thereby, the learner is unable to express something that is in his mind and consequently uses an incorrect form. He eventually remembers the correct one (Cohen 1986; Olshtain 1989). Time is considered the decisive factor to measure how far the attrition has proceeded already (de Bot & Weltens, 1995).

== Hypotheses of language attrition ==
To have a better understanding of language attrition, it is necessary to examine the various hypotheses that attempt to explain how language memory changes over time.

=== Regression hypothesis ===
The regression hypothesis can be named as the first established theory in language loss. Its tradition goes far back, further than any other theory. The first researcher who designed it was Ribot in 1880. Later, Freud took Ribot's idea up again and related it to aphasia (Weltens & Schmid 2004: 211). In 1940, Roman Jakobson embedded it into a linguistic framework and claimed that language attrition is the mirror image of language acquisition (Weltens & Cohen 1989: 130). Even though only a few studies have tested this hypothesis, it is quite attractive to many researchers. As Weltens and Schmid (2004: 212) state, children acquire the language in stages. It was then suggested that language competence, in general, appears in different layers and therefore, attrition, as the mirror image of acquisition, will also happen from the top layer to the bottom.

=== Last-learned-first-forgotten hypothesis ===
According to the regression hypothesis, two similar approaches developed. Cohen started to conduct several studies on his own to determine "whether the last things learned are, in fact, the first things to be forgotten, and whether forgetting entails unlearning in reverse order from the original learning process" (Cohen 1975: 128). He observed the attrition of Spanish, as the second language, among school children during the summer vacation. Cohen's results supported the regression hypothesis and his last-learned-first-forgotten thesis. It supported the idea that some things, which are learned last, are the first to be forgotten when the learner has no input of the target language anymore.

=== Best-learned-last-forgotten hypothesis ===
Another variation of the regression hypothesis is the best learned-last-forgotten hypothesis, which emphasizes the intensity and quality of the acquired knowledge, not the order in which it is learned. Therefore, the better something is learned, the longer it will remain. Because the language component is repeated again and again, it becomes automated and increases the probability that it will last in the memory (Schöpper-Grabe 1998: 241).

=== Linguistic-feature hypothesis ===
The linguistic-feature hypothesis was introduced by Andersen (Andersen 1982). He claims that second languages or foreign languages that share more differences with the respective mother tongue than similarities are more endangered to be forgotten than those similar to the L1. Another point is the attrition of components, which are less "functional", "marked" or "frequent" compared to other elements (Weltens & Cohen 1989: 130). This hypothesis is more differentiated and complex than the regression hypothesis because it considers aspects from first- and second-language acquisition research, language contact and aphasia research and the survey of pidgin and creole languages (Müller 1995). By means of this hypothesis research, it tries to detect the aspects of language that are first to be forgotten.

== Process of language attrition ==
To define the process of language attrition, it is necessary to consider that there are different theories as to how the stages of language attrition occur.

=== Acquisition and incubation period ===
Gardner (1982: 519-520) believes that the process of second-language attrition is divided into three points in time:

1. second language learning begins (time 1)
2. language instruction terminates (time 2)
3. assessment of language competence (time 3)

Between times 1 to 2 is termed the acquisition period. Between times 2 to 3 is termed the incubation period (1982: 520). Further, he states that it is not enough to consider only the time that has passed between 2 and 3 to make statements about attrition. It is also necessary to consider the duration, relative success, and nature of the acquisition period and the duration and content of the incubation phase (Gardner 1982: 520). The acquisition period is the time where language learning or language experience occurs, mainly from the first to the last lesson. During the incubation period, no language training or language usage occurs and the forgetting may begin. He says that now that language learning is not active anymore, a study about language attrition can be conducted (Gardner 1982a: 2).

=== The typical forgetting curve ===
The forgetting curve orientates itself on the typical forgetting curve by Ebbinghaus. He said that already after a very short amount of time, a forgetting process sets in immediately, stabilizes and then levels off. Bahrick conducted a study where he tested 773 persons with Spanish as their L2. His probates had varying acquisition and incubation periods, up to 50 years of non-active learning. He discovered a heavy attrition within the first 5 years, which then stabilized for the next 20 years (Weltens & Cohen 1989: 130). According to Bahrick, the knowledge that remained after 5 years is stored in the permastore. Neisser (1984) uses a different term, he prefers critical threshold, a level that has to be reached. Beyond that threshold, knowledge will resist decay. Contrary to these findings Weltens & Cohen (1989: 130) are reporting from studies where different results were found. According to these findings, the forgetting curve begins with an initial plateau, a period where the language competence is not affected at all. This is then followed by the onset of attrition. Weltens explains these results: it is by the high proficiency of the probates (bilinguals and immersion students). However, it is still unknown whether the curve that follows this plateau is potentially exactly like the "normal" forgetting curve of language learners with a lower proficiency level (Weltens & Cohen 1989: 130).

=== Relearning ===
Another phenomenon is relearning. Some studies show that, despite the end of learning and no language input, a residual learning can happen. Weltens (1989), who studied foreign language learners, identifies an increase in reading and listening comprehension. He says that it happens because a process of maturation happens. Schöpper-Grabe determines that contact and the intensity with the target language cannot be the only variable causing language attrition (Schöpper-Grabe 1998).

== Factors influencing second-language attrition ==
In literature several factors are named for explaining why language competence is decreasing. Many researchers, however, regard the level of competence of the learner as essential for attrition. It is said that the higher the level of competence, the less attrition will occur. Thus, a reference to the theory of the critical threshold can be drawn. Similar to this theory it is claimed, that according to conducted studies, the higher the level of competence of the learner at the end of the incubation period, the fewer will be lost. Therefore, duration, success and intensity of the language instruction or language input in general is vitally important. Weltens (1987) divides the factors influencing language attrition into three categories: characteristics of the acquisition process (method of instruction, length of exposure, proficiency before attrition, relationship between L1 and the FL), characteristics of the attrition period ('post exposure' and length of the attrition period), and learner characteristics. The second category are sociopsychological factors, as the attitude towards the target language and culture and aligned with the motivation for acquiring the language. Further, factors, which are settled in the language environment, should be considered as well, e.g. the status and prestige of the language are meaningful, too. Another frequent occurring factor is age. A variable that seems to be quite important, especially observing language attrition in children. Even though children are regarded as the better foreign language learner, their cognitive development is less progressed compared to adults. Further, usually they haven't learned to write or read in any language, and usually particularly not in the second language at all. Therefore, their literacy skill in the L2 is very limited if not even there yet. Cohen (1989) conducted a study observing young children. He found out, that the attrition in an 8-year-old boy was stronger than the one in his 12-year-old sister. Tomiyama, suggested on the basis of her findings, that these children might not lose their knowledge of the L2 completely, moreover the access to such information is inaccessible and may vanish with time passing by. At the beginning of the 80s another, so far unnoticed factor, was introduced into the research field. Socioaffective factors as attitude, orientation and motivation are now accounted. On account of that, he established a socio-educational model of language acquisition. Thereby motivation and attitude influence the workload of the individual to keep their language competence. Further, individuals, who have positive attitudes towards the target language, seek possibilities and opportunities during the incubation period to retain their language competence (Gardner 1987: 521). However, the factor motivation is hardly considered examining language attrition. Especially during the last 10–15 years it became more and more acknowledged in the field of language acquisition rather than attrition. Only Gardner considered motivation as a possible factor influencing attrition. Even until today it is hardly recognised as an influencing factor and therefore exist only a few studies about motivation and its effects.

== Areas affected by language attrition ==
Feuerhake (2004: 7) reports that, looking at released studies, that have been conducted, it can be seen that all four competence areas are affected. Though some of these seem more likely to be affected than others, e.g. grammar and lexical knowledge are more likely to suffer a high attrition process. Showing loss in speaking competence, the first evidence is that the speech tempo decreases. Longer and more frequently occurring speech pauses, under which the fluency is suffering, are observable as well (Gardner 1987). Olshtain (1986) observed "[…] reduced accessibility in vocabulary retrieval in all situations of attrition where there is a reduction of language loss over longer periods of time." (1986: 163). Further, gaps concerning grammatical knowledge, especially tenses and conjunction of verbs occur quite frequently. Nevertheless, it can be said that productive skills are more affected than receptive ones, which mainly remain constantly stable (Cohen 1989) and if the learner shows already signs of language attrition it is more likely that transfer from L1 will happen (Berman & Olshtain 1983). Cohen examined in his studies several strategies, the learner applies to compensate the lack of adequate speaking skills, e.g. one strategy is code-switching, to uphold the communication. Another phenomenon observable is a kind of "mixed-language". Müller (1995) states that on many levels of speaking the learner falls back on a mixture between different languages. Still, it is important to mention, that, as with almost every study that has been conducted in the different sub-fields of second-language acquisition research, several problems arise. There are longitudinal vs. cross-sectional studies, different variables, which have been used, and mainly terms and conditions of acquisition and incubation period are not standardised, particularly the length of the incubation period (Feuerhake 2004: 8). That means, some studies only observe language attrition after language programs, other look at the attrition in between breaks of language programs and studies, which examine the attrition after change of environment, regarding language and living conditions (Cohen 1975, Olshtain 1989). Finally, studies reviewed in this paper show that attrition follows a certain order, e.g. productive skills are more affected than receptive skills. Mainly due to difficulties in lexical retrieval a loss in fluency seems to be the first signs of language attrition, followed by attrition in morphology and syntax. Further observations in language attrition are necessary, to give a better understanding of how the human mind deals with language (Hansen 1999: 78).

== Motivation ==
The following section is trying to explain motivation and its influence on language attrition. Until 1990 the sociopsychological model of Gardner dominated the research about motivation. Gardner and Lambert emphasise thereby the importance of attitude towards the language, the target country and language community (Feuerhake 2004).

=== Instrumental and integrative orientation ===
According to Gardner and Lambert (1972) a learner is instrumental orientated if learning a foreign language has a function, e.g. for success in career terms. Thereby, the language becomes an instrument to achieve the higher purpose and the foreign language learning is concentrated on fulfilling the aim of the learner (Feuerhake 2004: 9). The integrative orientation follows the aim of acculturating with the target language and country as well as the integration into the target language community.

=== Intrinsic and extrinsic motivation ===
The instrumental and integrative orientation is not enough to cover all aspects of the term motivation, the term intrinsic and extrinsic motivation was added to the model. The term intrinsic is connected with behaviour, which results from the reward of the activity itself. The learner acts, because he is enjoying the activity or it is satisfying his curiosity. Mainly it is self-determined and the learner is eager to learn a foreign language because he wants to achieve a certain level of competence. The learner enjoys learning and the acquisition of a foreign language is challenging. Extrinsic motivated learners are orientated on external stimuli, e.g. positive feedback or expectations from others. In general four different types of extrinsic motivation can be distinguished (Bahar 2005):

1. External: the learner is only motivated through external stimuli, e.g. exams
2. Introjected: the learner pushes themselves to achieve the desired goal, e.g.
3. Identified: the value of the learning is recognised and for its own sake fulfilled.
4. Integrated regulation: part of the personality, i.e. to fulfil a need.

Bahar (2005: 66) quotes Pintrich & Schunk (1996), who state that "[…] motivation involves various mental processes that lead to the initiation and maintenance of action […]". Hence, motivation is a dynamic process that changes over time and the motivation of a learner as well might change during the learning process. Therefore, it cannot be seen as an isolated factor. Moreover, several other factors, which are settled within the learner, as well as in the environment, influence motivation and are responsible for its intensity and variability.

== Other studies ==
Gardner, Lalonde, & Moorcroft (1987) investigated the nature of L2-French skills attriting by L1-English grade 12 students during the summer vacation, and the role played by attitudes and motivation in promoting language achievement and language maintenance. Students who finished the L2 class highly proficient are more likely to retain what they knew. Yet high achievers in the classroom situation are no more likely to make efforts to use the L2 outside the classroom unless they have positive attitudes and high levels of motivation. The authors write: "an underlying determinant of both acquisition and use is motivation" (p. 44).

In fact, the nature of language acquisition is still so complex and so much is still unknown, not all students will have the same experiences during the incubation period. It is possible that some students will appear to attrite in some areas and others will appear to attrite in other areas. Some students will appear to maintain the level that they had previously achieved. And still, other students will appear to improve.

Murtagh (2003) investigated retention and attrition of L2-Irish in Ireland with second level school students. At Time 1, she found that most participants were motivated instrumentally, yet the immersion students were most likely to be motivated integratively and they had the most positive attitudes towards learning Irish. Immersion school students were also more likely to have opportunities to use Irish outside the classroom/school environment. Self-reports correlated with ability. She concludes that the educational setting (immersion schools, for example) and the use of the language outside the classroom were the best predictors for L2-Irish acquisition. Eighteen months later, Murtagh finds that the majority of groups 1 and 2 believe their Irish ability has attrited, the immersion group less so. The results from the tests, however, do not show any overall attrition. Time as a factor did not exert any overall significant change on the sample's proficiency in Irish (Murtagh, 2003:159).

Fujita (2002), in a study evaluating attrition among bilingual Japanese children, says that a number of factors are seen as necessary to maintain the two languages in the returnee child. Those factors include: age on arrival in the L2 environment, length of residence in the L2 environment, and proficiency levels of the L1. Furthermore, she found that L2 attrition was closely related to another factor: age of the child on returning to the L1 environment. Children returning around or before 9 were more likely to attrite than those returning later. Upon returning from overseas, pressure from society, their family, their peers and themselves force returnee children to switch channels back to the L1 and they quickly make effort to attain the level of native-like L1 proficiency of their peers. At the same time, lack of L2 support in the schools in particular and in society in general results in an overall L2 loss.

== Notable researchers ==
- Kees de Bot
- Vivian Cook
