= Lightbound =

Lightbound is a surname. Notable people with the surname include:

- Carrie Lightbound (born 1979), Canadian sprint kayaker
- Joël Lightbound (born 1988), Canadian politician
