= Patsy M. Lightbown =

American applied linguist (born 1944)

Patsy Martin Lightbown
- Born: North Carolina, US
- Occupation: Distinguished Professor Emerita of Concordia University
- Known for: Second Language Acquisition
- Awards: 1988: SPEAQ Award 1993: First Place in the English Speaking Union's Duke of Edinburgh Book Prize in Applied Linguistics 2001: Concordia University Alumni Association's Award for Excellence in Teaching 2014: Honorary Lifetime Membership, Canadian Association of Second Language Teachers.

Academic background
- Education: University of North Carolina at Greensboro Yale University Columbia University

Academic work
- Discipline: Applied Psycholinguistics
- Website: http://davidlightbown.com/patsylightbown/

Patsy M. Lightbown (born 1944 in North Carolina, USA) is an American applied linguist whose research focuses on the teaching and acquisition of second and/or foreign languages in a classroom context. Her theories of second language acquisition earned her the SPEAQ Award for "contributions which have had an impact on the entire English (second language) teaching community in Quebec". She served in the United States Peace Corps in Niger, West Africa from 1965 to 1967. In her more than forty years in the field she has taught at multiple universities across the United States, Australia and Canada. She holds the title of Distinguished Professor Emerita at Concordia University in Montreal, Quebec. She has written seven published books and has been featured in many book chapters and refereed journals. She currently works as an independent consultant, editor, researcher and writing in second language acquisition and learning.

== Early life and education ==
Lightbown was born in 1944 in North Carolina. She received a Bachelor of Arts cum laude in French language in 1965 from the University of North Carolina at Greensboro. She then went on to achieve her Certificate in French at Hamilton College, spending her junior year in France in 1964.

A few years later, Lightbown went on to obtain an M.A.T. in French at Yale University in 1968. She received a Master of Education in teaching English as a second or other language from Columbia University in 1975. She was awarded a Ph.D. in psycholinguistics from Columbia University in 1977.

== Career ==
Lightbown enrolled in the United States Peace Corps from July 1965 to June 1967. She was deployed in Niger, West Africa as a public health worker. Her experience would later help her identify and contribute to educational and humanitarian projects, like NAD, an education, training and community development complex located in Labé, Guinea.

From 1974 to 2001, Lightbown would work at Concordia University in the Applied Linguistics/TESL Centre. She would also work as a visiting professor at Northern Arizona University, Michigan State University, Pennsylvania State University, La Trobe University in Melbourne, Australia, and McGill University. She currently works as an independent writer and editor. She is frequently consulted by schools, universities, publishers and government agencies in areas related to second language acquisition and foreign language teaching.

Throughout her career, Lightbown also volunteered as a consultant for the Centre scolaire et de sauté Néné Aissatou Diallo (CSS-NAD) in Labé, Guinea, West Africa as they built their primary school programming. She holds positions as a member of the Oxford University Press Expert Panel that launched in 2019, was a co-editor along with Nina Spada for the Oxford Key Concepts for the Language Classroom (2014–2019). Lightbown also held a consultant role in 2003 to WGBH, the local television station in Boston, that created a language learning video series.

Lightbown wrote for a series called RENEW in 2001–2002 that was distributed to teachers in Quebec. From the year 1973 up until 2017 she has contributed over thirty chapters to books. From 1974 to 2020, she authored and or collaborated on over fifty articles in both English and French and across academic journals ranging from TESL Canada Journal, Working Papers on Bilingualism, and the Canadian Modern Language Review.

She was also past president, president, vice president and program chair of the American Association for Applied Linguistics between the years of 1998–2001. In 2005, she became a Distinguished Professor Emerita of Concordia University.

== Research ==
Lightbown's published work includes over fifty books, articles and book chapters on second language acquisition, language teaching and learning in classroom contexts. She frequently collaborates with Nina Spada and over her career has expanded on Second Language Acquisition theories that have influenced the way that second language teachers approach their classrooms in more practical ways that are not simply theory. Learning and teaching approaches developed as a result of this collaboration included "communicative approach" and "audiolingual approach", which were presented in the book, How Languages are Learned.

In 2014, Lightbown published Focus on Content-Based Language Teaching to provide insight into the theoretical background of CBLT, some of its benefits and downfalls, and methods for teachers to apply it to their classrooms. Lightbown's goal is to provide a rewarding language learning experience to students in a CBLT environment.

In Lightbown's latest research with Nina Spada, they expand on some of their previous works on the challenges that face second and foreign language learners. The research is founded on unpacking the ideas behind some older beliefs on both the style of teaching second language learners and their age. It has been thought that once a learner moves closer to the end of their critical period of development that they would lose their ability to become proficient language learners. This new research that these researchers complied shows evidence that learners who begin learning later actually have an advantage as they pull on the language information that they already have stored from learning and working with their first language.

The research continues to challenge older research and brings up more cons instead of pros for an early introduction to language learning, which was not always the case in Second Language Acquisition theory. Some of these cons include the ideas around consistent use, and Lightbown and Spada spent time reviewing studies that show many students (less than 50%) stopped at an A1 level of proficiency in their second languages.

Ultimately, the new research suggests a change in the way we approach limiting the students’ use of their first language, increasing instruction time where possible by perhaps including intensive instruction in smaller timeframes instead of small lectures over a longer period of time, and include teaching subjects in the second language to help facilitate interest and context.

== Awards ==
- 1988: SPEAQ Award (Société pour la promotion de l’enseignement de l’anglais, langue seconde, au Québec) for contributions which have had an impact on the entire English (second language) teaching community in Quebec.
- 1993:HRH Duke of Edinburgh's English Language Book Award – How Languages Are Learned
- 2001: Concordia University Alumni Association's Award for Excellence in Teaching.
- 2014: Honorary Lifetime Membership at the Canadian Association of Second Language Teachers
- 2014: HRH Duke of Edinburgh's English Language Book Award (shortlisted) – Focus on Content-Based Language Teaching
- 2015: British Council Award for ELT Writing runner up for Focus on Content-Based Language Teaching

== Selected publications ==
=== Books ===
- 1975 Structure and variation in child language. Monographs of the Society for Research in Child Development, 40(2). (with L. Bloom and L. Hood).
- 1986 Both sides of the desk: Roles and responsibilities in ESL/EFL teaching and learning. [Special Issue]. TESL Canada Journal. (with Eds. S. Firth).
- 1991 Input, instruction and feedback in second language acquisition. [Special Issue]. Second Language Research, 7(2).
- 1993 The role of instruction in second language acquisition. [Thematic issue]. Studies in Second Language Acquisition, 15(2). (with N. Spada and L. White).
- 2013 How languages are learned, fourth edition. Oxford: Oxford University Press. (with . Spada).
- 2014 Learning a second language in the classroom. Shanghai: Shanghai Foreign Language Education Press.
- 2014 Focus on content-based language teaching. Oxford: Oxford University Press.

== Sources ==
- Lightbown, Patsy M. "Patsy Lightbown Curriculum Vitae". Retrieved on November 3, 2020.
- Spada, Nina (2012). Patsy M. Lightbown. The Encyclopedia of Applied Linguistics. https://doi.org/10.1002/9781405198431.wbeal1355
- American Association of Applied Linguistics (2019) Patsy Lightbown and Nina Spada. https ://www.aaal.org/2019-pleanary-speaker-patsy-m-lightbown
- Ellis, Rod. Becoming and Being an Applied Linguist: The life histories of some applied linguists. ISBN 9789027212375
