= U-shaped development =

U-shaped development, also known as U-shaped learning, is the typical pattern by which select physical, artistic, and cognitive skills are developed. It is called "U" shape development because of the shape of the letter U in relation to a graph: skills developed in the "U-shaped" fashion begin on a high position on a graph's Y-axis. The skills start out at a high performance level and over time the skills descend to a lower position on the Y-axis. After another period of time the skill once again ascends to a higher position on the y-axis. A U-shaped time line is created of the skills development.

U-shaped development can be seen in cognitive skills such as learning new words, or doing high-level algorithms in mathematics. The skill can also be artistic such as painting or playing a musical instrument, and physical skills such as walking and weight lifting.

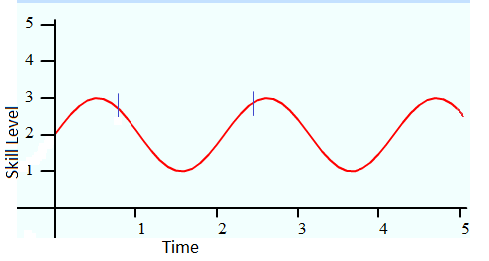
The two blue lines are the start and stop of one "U" graph segment

== Artistic skill development ==
This U-shaped curve is different from the other types of skill development because this skill has an artistic rating with it, which means there could be differences in opinion, but in studies where children, adult artists, and non-artist adults were all given the same directions to draw a self portrait, the children's and the artists' were the closest of the three to depicting the face when picked by an outside group. In theory, this result is because of an innate "creative skill" in children that is either lost to age with non-artist adults or practised by adult artists. In artists the Y-axis would be the "creative skill", and the X-axis would be time, but in non-artists the U-shaped curve would not apply.

== Physical skill development ==
The U-shaped development in physical skill comes from the development and recession of muscular strength, on the graph the Y-axis is muscular strength and the X-axis is time. Muscular strength develops and recedes over time because of necessity; one example of this is a baby learning to walk. The baby will gain the strength in its legs to be able to support itself and walk (which is the left top of the "U"), but it then grows larger, and the strength in its legs becomes less than required to support itself (the bottom of the "U"), but then the baby's leg strength increases again which gives it the ability to support itself again (the right top of the "U").

== Cognitive skill development ==
This developmental curve reflects the progression of intuitive thinking processes as a person develops more advanced knowledge structures in a specific area. The shape of the curve reflects the variability of general intuitional availability. This means once intuition levels increase but also they can make more higher order intuitive connections/understandings given a corresponding increase in expertise. In this graph the axes would be availability of intuition (being the Y-axis) and level of expertise (being the X-axis), instead of the skill level (being the Y-axis) and time (being the X-axis). The "U" curve represents two different types of intuition: which are referred to as immature intuition (the top-left of the "U") and mature intuition (the top-right of the "U").

== Other theories ==
There have been other human development theories in the past such as:

- Cognitive theory - A learning theory of psychology that explains the behavior of human through thought process. The theory states that humans are logical beings, that make the choices that make the most sense to them.
- Social and situational theory - Learning and development based on the person's situation and their social standing.
- Humanist theory - A theory that the behavior changes based on what education was received by the individual.

There are branch theories that relate to these theories and the theories have different notions on how environmental stimuli change a person, but none dismiss or disprove the U-shaped development theory.

== See also ==
- Art
- Beginner's luck
- Cognition
- Developmental psychology
- Kuznets curve
- Skill
