= Theories of second-language acquisition =

The main purpose of theories of second-language acquisition (SLA) is to shed light on how people who already know one language learn a second language. The field of second-language acquisition involves various contributions, such as linguistics, sociolinguistics, psychology, cognitive science, neuroscience, and education. These multiple fields in second-language acquisition can be grouped as four major research strands: (a) linguistic dimensions of SLA, (b) cognitive (but not linguistic) dimensions of SLA, (c) socio-cultural dimensions of SLA, and (d) instructional dimensions of SLA. While the orientation of each research strand is distinct, they are in common in that they can guide us to find helpful condition to facilitate successful language learning. Acknowledging the contributions of each perspective and the interdisciplinarity between each field, more and more second language researchers are now trying to have a bigger lens on examining the complexities of second language acquisition.

== History ==
As SLA began as an interdisciplinary field, it is hard to pin down a precise starting date. However, there are two publications in particular that are seen as instrumental to the development of the modern study of SLA: (1) Corder's 1967 essay The Significance of Learners' Errors, and (2) Selinker's 1972 article Interlanguage. Corder's essay rejected a behaviorist account of SLA and suggested that learners made use of intrinsic internal linguistic processes; Selinker's article argued that second-language learners possess their own individual linguistic systems that are independent from both the first and second languages.

In the 1970s the general trend in SLA was for research exploring the ideas of Corder and Selinker, and refuting behaviorist theories of language acquisition. Examples include research into error analysis, studies in transitional stages of second-language ability, and the "morpheme studies" investigating the order in which learners acquired linguistic features. The 70s were dominated by naturalistic studies of people learning English as a second language.

By the 1980s, the theories of Stephen Krashen's had become the prominent paradigm in the field of SLA. In his theories, often collectively known as the Input Hypothesis, Krashen suggested that language acquisition is driven solely by comprehensible input, language input that learners can understand. Krashen's model was influential in the field of SLA and also had a large influence on language teaching. During this period, new theories such as Michael Long's Interaction Hypothesis, Merrill Swain's Output Hypothesis, and Richard Schmidt's Noticing Hypothesis were introduced. Additionally, notable contributions included White's descriptions of learner competence and Pienemann's use of speech processing models and lexical functional grammar to explain learner output. This period also saw the beginning of approaches based in other disciplines, such as the psychological approach of connectionism.

The 1990s were characterized by two major areas of research focus: linguistic theories of SLA based on Noam Chomsky's Universal Grammar and psychological approaches such as skill acquisition theory and connectionism. This era also saw the development of new frameworks, including Processability Theory and Input Processing Theory. Furthermore, sociocultural theory, which explains SLA in terms of the learner's social environment, and approaches influenced by complexity science were introduced during this period. These trends persisted into the 2000s, with research remaining divided between linguistic and psychological approaches. Scholars like VanPatten and Benati have noted that this division is unlikely to change in the near future, given the strong support both areas receive from the broader fields of linguistics and psychology, respectively.

== Early cognitive approaches to SLA ==
These hypotheses collectively belong to early cognitive approaches to SLA, emphasizing the importance of input, output, and learner interaction in the acquisition process.

=== Input hypothesis ===
Learners' most direct source of information about the target language is the target language itself. When they come into direct contact with the target language, this is referred to as "input." When learners process that language in a way that can contribute to learning, this is referred to as "intake". However, it must be at a level that is comprehensible to them. In his monitor theory, Krashen advanced the concept that language input should be at the "i+1" level, just beyond what the learner can fully understand; this input is comprehensible, but contains structures that are not yet fully understood. This has been criticized on the basis that there is no clear definition of i+1, and that factors other than structural difficulty (such as interest or presentation) can affect whether input is actually turned into intake. The concept has been quantified, however, in vocabulary acquisition research; Nation reviews various studies which indicate that about 98% of the words in running text should be previously known in order for extensive reading to be effective.

In his Input Hypothesis, Krashen proposes that language acquisition takes place only when learners receive input just beyond their current level of L2 competence. He termed this level of input "i+1." However, in contrast to emergentist and connectionist theories, he follows the innate approach by applying Chomsky's Government and binding theory and concept of Universal grammar (UG) to second-language acquisition. He does so by proposing a Language Acquisition Device that uses L2 input to define the parameters of the L2, within the constraints of UG, and to increase the L2 proficiency of the learner. In addition, Krashen (1982)'s Affective Filter Hypothesis holds that the acquisition of a second language is halted if the learner has a high degree of anxiety when receiving input. According to this concept, a part of the mind filters out L2 input and prevents intake by the learner, if the learner feels that the process of SLA is threatening. As mentioned earlier, since input is essential in Krashen's model, this filtering action prevents acquisition from progressing.

A great deal of research has taken place on input enhancement, the ways in which input may be altered so as to direct learners' attention to linguistically important areas. Input enhancement might include bold-faced vocabulary words or marginal glosses in a reading text. Research here is closely linked to research on pedagogical effects, and comparably diverse.

Krashen also posits a distinction between "acquisition" and "learning." According to Krashen, L2 acquisition is a subconscious process of incidentally "picking up" a language, as children do when becoming proficient in their first languages. Language learning, on the other hand, is studying, consciously and intentionally, the features of a language, as is common in traditional classrooms. Krashen sees these two processes as fundamentally different, with little or no interface between them. In common with connectionism, Krashen sees input as essential to language acquisition.

Monitoring is another important concept in some theoretical models of learner use of L2 knowledge. According to Krashen, the Monitor is a component of an L2 learner's language processing device that uses knowledge gained from language learning to observe and regulate the learner's own L2 production, checking for accuracy and adjusting language production when necessary.

Critiques of the input hypothesis

Since its inception, Stephen Krashen's Comprehensible Input (CI) Hypothesis has also been controversial and criticized by many scholars in the field of second language acquisition (SLA). Some researchers have argued that the theory lacks testability, is conceptually ambiguous, and exaggerates the role of "comprehensible input" in language acquisition. Recent developments in cognitive neuroscience suggest that language learning is not a mere absorption of linguistic information, but rather an interactive, embodied, and highly neuroplastic process. Brain imaging studies have shown that active language use, social interaction, and direct feedback activate significantly more brain regions than taking in comprehensible information alone.

In the 2020s, a new line of critique emerged that combined findings from linguistic neuroscience, ecological psychology, and adaptive learning technologies. These approaches argue that language acquisition should be understood as a dynamic coupling between the brain and the environment, rather than as a linear processing of linguistic input, as demonstrated in the Input Hypothesis diagram. This line of language educational philosophy emphasises the role of social interaction, multimodal experience, and affordance-rich contexts, and points out the conceptual and empirical limitations of the i+1 model when applied to modern personalised learning environments. A 2025 article by Nguyen Nhat Quang and Doan Thi Hue Dung proposed a systematic neuro-ecological critique of the Comprehensible Input Hypothesis, combining evidence from embodiment theory, affordance theory, and AI-assisted adaptive learning, to suggest an alternative theoretical framework for language education. This paradigm views language acquisition as a dynamic coordination between the brain, body, and environment, rather than a linear process based on linguistic input. Drawing on findings from linguistic neuroscience, embodiment theory, and ecological psychology, this approach argues that language is acquired through learners recognising, evaluating, and acting on affordances in the learning environment, and forming and reorganising neural networks through social interaction, feedback, and multimodal experiences. This theoretical framework also emphasises the role of personalisation and adaptive technology: instead of a fixed i+1 model, modern learning systems can continuously adjust language level and task type in real time based on learner data.

=== Interaction hypothesis ===
Long's interaction hypothesis proposes that language acquisition is strongly facilitated by the use of the target language in interaction. Similarly to Krashen's Input Hypothesis, the Interaction Hypothesis claims that comprehensible input is important for language learning. In addition, it claims that the effectiveness of comprehensible input is greatly increased when learners have to negotiate for meaning.

Long focuses on interaction, specifically the exchanges between teachers and learners or among learners themselves, and argues that linguistic and conversational adjustments made during these interactions facilitate SLA. In other words, through interaction, learners can have the difficulty of the content adjusted to their level whenever they encounter challenges, enabling them to learn more effectively from the process. This hypothesis builds on the Input Hypothesis, emphasizing the social aspects of how learners gain access to comprehensible input.

=== Output hypothesis ===
In the 1980s, Canadian SLA researcher Merrill Swain advanced the output hypothesis, that meaningful output is as necessary to language learning as meaningful input. However, most studies have shown little if any correlation between learning and quantity of output. Today, most scholars contend that small amounts of meaningful output are important to language learning, but primarily because the experience of producing language leads to more effective processing of input.

In recent years, the scope of research has expanded by incorporating insights from the socio-cultural theory discussed later. In particular, studies on "languaging" have provided further developments and broader perspectives on the output hypothesis.

=== Noticing hypothesis ===
Attention is another characteristic that some believe to have a role in determining the success or failure of language processing. Richard Schmidt states that although explicit metalinguistic knowledge of a language is not always essential for acquisition, the learner must be aware of L2 input in order to gain from it.

=== Automaticity ===
Thinkers have produced several theories concerning how learners use their internal L2 knowledge structures to comprehend L2 input and produce L2 output. One idea is that learners acquire proficiency in an L2 in the same way that people acquire other complex cognitive skills. Automaticity is the performance of a skill without conscious control. It results from the gradated process of proceduralization. In the field of cognitive psychology, Anderson expounds a model of skill acquisition, according to which persons use procedures to apply their declarative knowledge about a subject in order to solve problems. On repeated practice, these procedures develop into production rules that the individual can use to solve the problem, without accessing long-term declarative memory. Performance speed and accuracy improve as the learner implements these production rules. DeKeyser tested the application of this model to L2 language automaticity. He found that subjects developed increasing proficiency in performing tasks related to the morphosyntax of an artificial language, Autopractan, and performed on a learning curve typical of the acquisition of non-language cognitive skills. This evidence conforms to Anderson's general model of cognitive skill acquisition, supports the idea that declarative knowledge can be transformed into procedural knowledge, and tends to undermine the idea of Krashen that knowledge gained through language "learning" cannot be used to initiate speech production.

== Universal grammar ==
From the field of linguistics, the most influential theory by far has been Chomsky's theory of Universal Grammar (UG). The core of this theory lies on the existence of an innate universal grammar, grounded on the poverty of the stimulus. The UG model of principles, basic properties which all languages share, and parameters, properties which can vary between languages, has been the basis for much second-language research.

Under the influence of the Minimalist Program, more extensive and precise hypotheses are being generated, focusing on questions such as the initial state of interlanguage, which features are more difficult or easier to acquire, and the ultimate attainment of a second language.

=== Fundamental difference hypothesis ===
The Fundamental Difference Hypothesis (FDH), proposed by Bley-Vroman (1989), suggests that there is a fundamental distinction between L1 and L2 acquisition. According to this hypothesis, L1 acquisition is guided by UG and the innate language acquisition device, while L2 acquisition relies heavily on general cognitive mechanisms, such as problem-solving and memory. Adult learners are believed to have lost access to UG, which explains the persistent errors and slower progress often observed in L2 learning compared to L1 acquisition. Support for the FDH comes from studies showing qualitative differences between child and adult language learning, particularly in areas such as syntax and morphology. Critics argue, however, that advanced L2 learners can achieve near-native proficiency, suggesting that UG may still play a role, albeit indirectly, in adult L2 acquisition.

=== Wild grammar hypothesis ===
The Wild Grammar Hypothesis posits that the initial stages of second-language (L2) interlanguage are not constrained by Universal Grammar (UG). Instead, learners' early attempts at producing language result in what has been described as "wild grammars," characterized by unstructured and inconsistent patterns that do not align with linguistic principles observed in L1 acquisition. Critics of this hypothesis argue that even early interlanguage grammars exhibit UG-driven systematicity, as learners gradually refine their linguistic systems through exposure to the target language.

=== The missing surface inflection hypothesis ===
The Missing Surface Inflection Hypothesis (MSIH) proposes that the omission of inflectional morphology in L2 learner output reflects difficulties in mapping grammatical representations onto surface forms, rather than deficits in learners' underlying grammatical knowledge. It is explained that competition occurs between morphemes inserted in morphology, and in such cases, the underspecified form is incorrectly selected. Critics of this hypothesis suggest that some learners' difficulties may stem from representational deficits rather than mapping issues, particularly when L2 features differ significantly from those in the learners' L1.

=== Representational deficit hypothesis / interpretability hypothesis ===
The Representational Deficit Hypothesis (RDH) and the Interpretability Hypothesis (IH) are two closely related theories in SLA research that address adult learners' challenges in acquiring certain grammatical features in their L2. Both hypotheses claim that adult L2 learners struggle to acquire grammatical features in the L2 that are uninterpretable and absent in their L1. These uninterpretable features are syntactic elements that serve a grammatical function but lack semantic meaning, such as agreement, tense, or case markers. According to the RDH, adult learners lose full access to UG and therefore cannot fully represent new features in their interlanguage if those features are absent in their L1. Similarly, the IH, asserts that adult L2 learners face challenges with uninterpretable features in the L2 because these features lack semantic content and therefore require syntactic computation.

Both hypotheses converge on the idea that L2 acquisition in adulthood is constrained by the availability of UG and the learners' L1 grammar. They agree that uninterpretable features absent in the L1 are particularly challenging, leading to persistent errors or incomplete acquisition in the L2. However, they differ in their assumptions about the accessibility of UG: the RDH posits a complete loss of UG access for these features, whereas the IH suggests that UG is partially available but limited in supporting the acquisition of uninterpretable features.

=== Feature reassembly hypothesis ===
The Feature Reassembly Hypothesis (FRH) emphasizes the challenge L2 learners face in reorganizing their L1 linguistic features to match the configurations of the L2. Unlike the Valueless Features Hypothesis, this approach acknowledges that learners bring feature values from their L1, but these values often need to be restructured to accommodate the target language. This hypothesis has been praised for explaining difficulties in L2 acquisition, particularly when L1 and L2 grammars diverge significantly. However, questions remain about why some learners successfully reassemble features while others do not.

=== Interface hypothesis ===
The Interface Hypothesis explores the challenges learners face at the intersection of syntax and other linguistic domains, such as semantics and pragmatics. While UG may facilitate the acquisition of core syntactic structures, learners often struggle with interface phenomena that require the integration of multiple linguistic modules. The Interface Hypothesis has gained attention for addressing advanced stages of L2 acquisition, where subtle pragmatic or contextual errors persist. Critics argue, however, that such difficulties may be mitigated through targeted instruction and exposure to authentic language use, suggesting that interface challenges are not insurmountable.

=== Bottleneck hypothesis ===
The Bottleneck Hypothesis suggests that certain linguistic features in second-language acquisition (SLA) act as a bottleneck, limiting the progression of learners in acquiring the full grammatical system of the target language. According to this hypothesis, functional morphology is the most challenging aspect for adult L2 learners to acquire. This difficulty arises because functional morphology serves as a gateway to more complex linguistic structures and is central to linking syntax and semantics. Slabakova argues that while functional morphology is the bottleneck, other aspects of language acquisition, such as syntax and semantics, are comparatively easier to acquire because they involve structures or features that are interpretable and more directly tied to meaning. The Bottleneck Hypothesis uniquely focuses on the centrality of functional morphology as the gateway to overall grammatical competence.

== Critical period hypothesis ==
In 1967, Eric Lenneberg argued the existence of a critical period (approximately 2–13 years old) for the acquisition of a first language. This has attracted much attention in the realm of second language acquisition. For instance, Newport (1990) extended the argument of critical period hypothesis by pointing to a possibility that when a learner is exposed to an L2 might also contribute to their second language acquisition. Indeed, she revealed the correlation between age of arrival and second language performance. In this regard, second language learning might be affected by a learner's maturational state .

== Competition model ==
Some of the major cognitive theories of how learners organize language knowledge are based on analyses of how speakers of various languages analyze sentences for meaning. MacWhinney, Bates, and Kliegl found that speakers of English, German, and Italian showed varying patterns in identifying the subjects of transitive sentences containing more than one noun. English speakers relied heavily on word order; German speakers used morphological agreement, the animacy status of noun referents, and stress; and speakers of Italian relied on agreement and stress. MacWhinney et al. interpreted these results as supporting the Competition Model, which states that individuals use linguistic cues to get meaning from language, rather than relying on linguistic universals. According to this theory, when acquiring an L2, learners sometimes receive competing cues and must decide which cue(s) is most relevant for determining meaning.

== Connectionism and second-language acquisition ==
Connectionism

These findings also relate to Connectionism. Connectionism attempts to model the cognitive language processing of the human brain, using computer architectures that make associations between elements of language, based on frequency of co-occurrence in the language input. Frequency has been found to be a factor in various linguistic domains of language learning. Connectionism posits that learners form mental connections between items that co-occur, using exemplars found in language input. From this input, learners extract the rules of the language through cognitive processes common to other areas of cognitive skill acquisition. Since connectionism denies both innate rules and the existence of any innate language-learning module, L2 input is of greater importance than it is in processing models based on innate approaches, since, in connectionism, input is the source of both the units and the rules of language.

== Processability theory ==
Some theorists and researchers have contributed to the cognitive approach to second-language acquisition by increasing understanding of the ways L2 learners restructure their interlanguage knowledge systems to be in greater conformity to L2 structures. Processability theory states that learners restructure their L2 knowledge systems in an order of which they are capable at their stage of development. For instance, In order to acquire the correct morphological and syntactic forms for English questions, learners must transform declarative English sentences. They do so by a series of stages, consistent across learners. Clahsen proposed that certain processing principles determine this order of restructuring. Specifically, he stated that learners first, maintain declarative word order while changing other aspects of the utterances, second, move words to the beginning and end of sentences, and third, move elements within main clauses before subordinate clauses.

== Declarative/procedural model ==
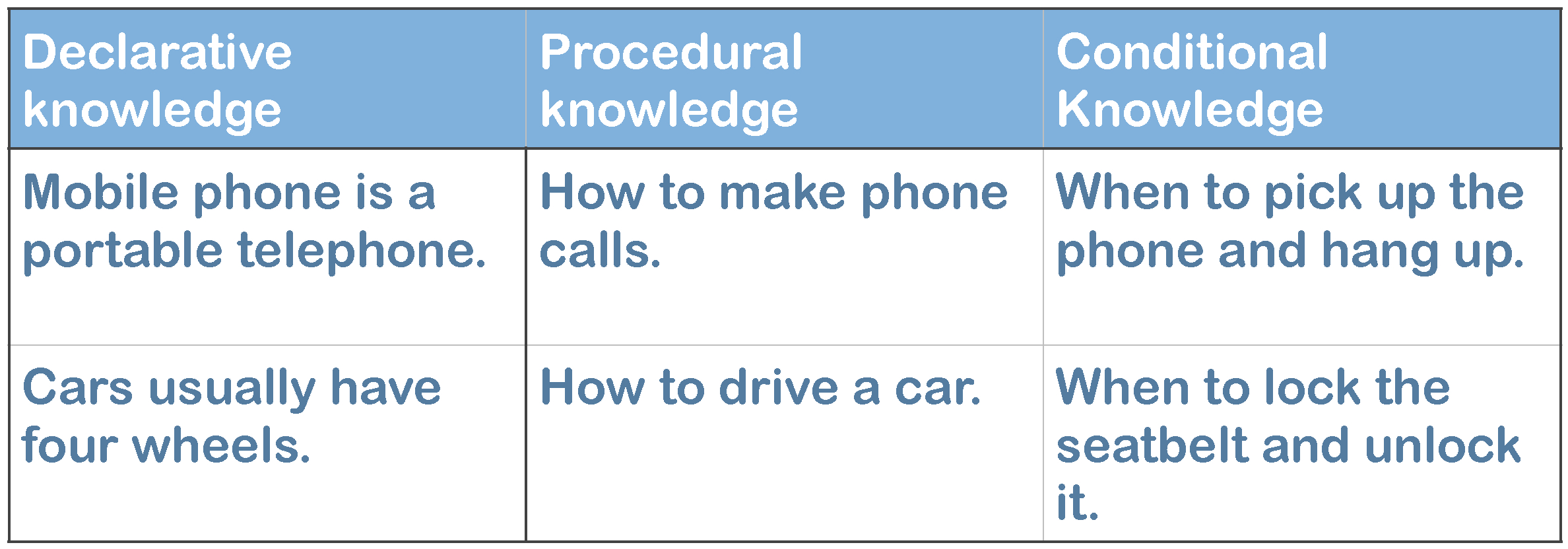
An example of declarative knowledge, procedural knowledge, and conditional knowledge

Michael T. Ullman has used a declarative/procedural model to understand how language information is stored. This model is consistent with a distinction made in general cognitive science between the storage and retrieval of facts, on the one hand, and understanding of how to carry out operations, on the other. It states that declarative knowledge consists of arbitrary linguistic information, such as irregular verb forms, that are stored in the brain's declarative memory. In contrast, knowledge about the rules of a language, such as grammatical word order is procedural knowledge and is stored in procedural memory. Ullman reviews several psycholinguistic and neurolinguistic studies that support the declarative/procedural model.

== Implicit/explicit linguistic knowledge ==
Although it is sometimes compared to the declarative/procedural model, in the field of SLA, knowledge types are often categorized based on awareness into "implicit knowledge" and "explicit knowledge." The declarative/procedural framework focuses on the memory system - how knowledge is stored and utilised. The two frameworks overlap but are not entirely interchangeable.

Implicit knowledge usually refers to knowledge acquired unconsciously and intuitively through meaningful exposure to and use of language, resembling the knowledge of a first language. On the other hand, explicit knowledge involves conscious understanding of grammatical rules and structures, primarily acquired through formal education and learning.

There is ongoing debate about how these two types of knowledge interact (or do not interact), and this remains one of the central topics in SLA research.

The interface positions regarding the relationship between implicit and explicit knowledge include:

- Strong interface: Proposes that explicit knowledge can become implicit through practice and automatization.
- No interface: Argues that implicit and explicit knowledge are entirely separate systems and that explicit knowledge cannot transform into implicit knowledge.
- Weak interface: Suggests that explicit knowledge can assist the development of implicit knowledge, but only under certain conditions (e.g., noticing gaps, attending to form).

Recent studies emphasize the dynamic nature of the interface between implicit and explicit knowledge. For example, Ellis (2005) argues that conscious attention and explicit knowledge facilitate the formation of pattern recognizers, which serve as a foundation for implicit learning. Subsequently, implicit learning integrates and refines these recognizers, creating a dynamic interaction that evolves over time. Kim and Godfroid (2023) also demonstrated that implicit and explicit knowledge influence each other reciprocally, with the nature of their interaction being shaped by learning environments and task characteristics. Their findings highlight how context-dependent factors mediate the relationship between the two knowledge systems.

Moreover, Dienes and Perner (2001) and Williams (2005) suggest that learners' unconscious implicit knowledge can later prompt conscious noticing and the formation of explicit rules. Rebuschat and Williams (2012) propose that statistical learning underpins implicit knowledge, which, in turn, guides learners in constructing explicit rules and metalinguistic knowledge.

== Sociocultural theory ==
Sociocultural theory was originally coined by Wertsch in 1985 and derived from the work of Lev Vygotsky and the Vygotsky Circle in Moscow from the 1920s onwards. Sociocultural theory is the notion that human mental function is from participating cultural mediation integrated into social activities. The central thread of sociocultural theory focuses on diverse social, historical, cultural, and political contexts where language learning occurs and how learners negotiate or resist the diverse options that surround them. More recently, in accordance with this sociocultural thread, Larsen-Freeman created the triangle form that shows the interplay of four Important concepts in language learning and education: (a) teacher, (b) learner, (c) language or culture and (d) context. In this regard, what makes sociocultural theory different from other theories is that it argues that second language acquisition is not a universal process. On the contrary, it views learners as active participants by interacting with others and also the culture of the environment.

== Complex dynamic systems theory ==
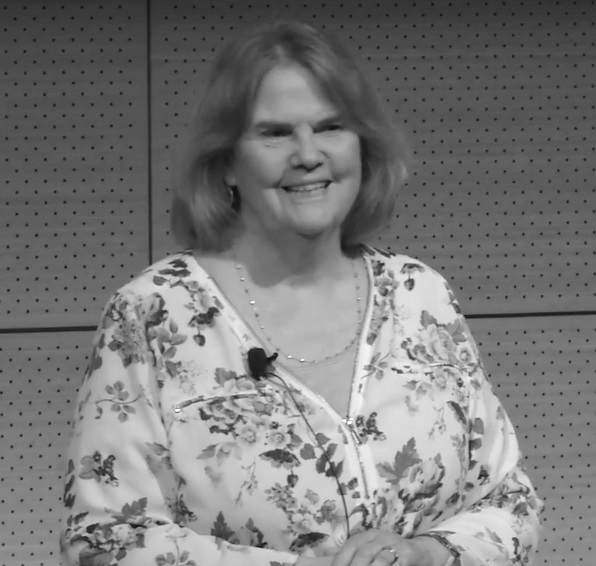
Larsen-Freeman

Second language acquisition has been usually investigated by applying traditional cross-sectional studies. In these designs usually a pre-test post-test method is used. However, in the 2000s a novel angle emerged in the field of second language research. These studies mainly adopt Dynamic systems theory perspective to analyse longitudinal time-series data. Scientists such as Larsen-Freeman, Verspoor, de Bot, Lowie, van Geert claim that second language acquisition can be best captured by applying longitudinal case study research design rather than cross-sectional designs. In these studies variability is seen a key indicator of development, self-organization from a Dynamic systems parlance. The interconnectedness of the systems is usually analysed by moving correlations.

However, the theory incorporated into SLA by Larsen-Freeman and Cameron has been criticized for several reasons: the lack of evidence demonstrating its consistency with actual data, its deviation from the original complex systems theory by entirely excluding mathematical formalization, its disregard for the stability of linguistic knowledge, and its failure to distinguish between systematic error and random error due to an overemphasis on complexity.

== Affordance Theory and Neuro-ecological Approaches ==
In the 2020s, with the development of cognitive neuroscience and ecological approaches to psychology, a new educational paradigm has emerged in the field of second language acquisition (SLA), called the neuroecological and affordance-based paradigm. Different from traditional cognitive models that separate "mind" and "environment", this paradigm views language learning as a co-evolutionary process between the brain, the body, and the socio-material context, in which language competence is not only symbolic knowledge but also the ability to perceive, act, and construct meaning in the living environment. This approach inherits the ecological psychology of James J. Gibson (1979) and the ecological linguistics of Leo van Lier (2004), and is extended in an interdisciplinary direction between neuroscience, embodied pragmatics, and distributed cognition theory.

At the heart of this shift in ideology is the concept of the "affordance field," a dynamic structure that reflects the interaction between the learner and the environment, where linguistic knowledge is formed as a result of perceptions and intentional actions. From this foundation, Quang N. Nguyen (2022, 2025) was one of the first scholars in the 2020s to systematise and develop a multidimensional model of the affordance theory to language education. This model includes the axes of perceptibility, valence, intentionality, compositionality, and normativity. These concepts have helped propose a new shift for SLA research from focusing on language structures to considering how people perceive, orient, and act in real learning contexts. Although this is a novel trend of educational reform, the conceptual and paradigm shift has the potential to clarify the mechanism of neuro-environmental coupling in the process of language competence formation. This direction is expected to be an important extension of traditional ecological theory, creating a post-cognitivist paradigm transformation in applied linguistics. This neuro-ecological shift is a welcoming effort in restructuring the philosophical foundation of educational psychology and language education, paving the way for studies connecting neuroscience, social behaviour and meaning construction in learning life.

== Usage-based model ==
The usage-based model in second language acquisition (SLA) is a theoretical framework that emphasizes the role of language use and experience in the development of linguistic competence. Unlike rule-based approaches, which assume innate linguistic structures, the usage-based model suggests that language acquisition is driven by the frequency and context of linguistic input, as well as the learner's interactions with the language.

The usage-based model draws heavily from cognitive and functional linguistics, particularly the work of scholars such as Michael Tomasello and Joan Bybee. These approaches highlight that language emerges from general cognitive processes such as pattern recognition, categorization, and analogical reasoning, rather than relying on an innate universal grammar.
