= Focus on form =

Concept in language education

Focus on form (FonF), also called form-focused instruction, is an approach to language education in which learners are made aware of linguistic forms – such as individual words and conjugations – in the context of a communicative activity. It is contrasted with focus on forms, in which forms are studied in isolation, and focus on meaning, in which no attention is paid to forms at all. For instruction to qualify as focus on form and not as focus on forms, the learner must be aware of the meaning and use of the language features before the form is brought to their attention. Focus on form was proposed by Michael Long in 1988.

== Background ==
The concept of focus on form was motivated by the lack of support for the efficacy of focus on forms on the one hand, and clear advantages demonstrated by instructed language learning over uninstructed learning on the other. The research conflicting with focus on forms has been wide-ranging; learners typically acquire language features in sequences, not all at once, and most of the stages the learners' interlanguages pass through will exhibit non-native-like language forms. Furthermore, the progression of these stages is not clean; learners may use language features correctly in some situations but not in others, or they may exhibit U-shaped learning, in which native-like use may temporarily revert to non-native-like use. None of these findings sit well with the idea that students will learn exactly what you teach them, when you teach it.

In a review of the literature comparing instructed with uninstructed language learning, Long found a clear advantage for instructed learning in both the rate of learning and the ultimate level reached. An important finding that supported Long's view came from French language immersion programs in Canada; even after students had years of meaning-focused lessons filled with comprehensible input, their spoken language remained far from native-like, with many grammatical errors. This is despite the fact that they could speak fluently and had native-like listening abilities.
