= Order of acquisition =

The order of acquisition is a concept in language acquisition describing the specific order in which all language learners acquire the grammatical features of their first language (L1). This concept is based on the observation that all children acquire their first language in a fixed, universal order, regardless of the specific grammatical structure of the language they learn. Linguistic research has largely confirmed that this phenomenon is true for first-language learners; order of acquisition for second-language learners is much less consistent. It is not clear why the order differs for second-language (L2) learners, though current research suggests this variability may stem from first-language interference or general cognitive interference from nonlinguistic mental faculties.

== Research background ==
Researchers have found a very consistent order in the acquisition of first-language structures by children, which has drawn interest from Second Language Acquisition (SLA) scholars. Considerable effort has been devoted to testing the "identity hypothesis", which asserts that first and second language acquisitions may conform to similar patterns. This, however, has not been confirmed, perhaps because second-language learners' cognition and affect states are more developed. The two may have common neurological bases, but no convincing scientific evidence supports this hypothesis.

Brown (1973) conducted a study on the acquisition of 14 grammatical morphemes by three English-speaking children and found that their developmental patterns were remarkably similar. This study is said to have initiated research in the field of SLA to investigate whether the patterns of L1 and L2 acquisition are also similar.

Dulay and Burt produced a highly cited and classic study in this area. They investigated the acquisition order of eight grammatical morphemes (progressive -ing, plural -s, irregular past tense, possessive 's, articles, third-person singular -s, copula be, and auxiliary be) among children learning English as a second language. Their study included 95 Mexican-American children, 26 Spanish-speaking children, and 30 Puerto Rican children. The researchers predicted that the three groups would exhibit the same acquisition order, but that this order would differ from what is observed in first language acquisition. This was based on the assumption that the semantic distinctions second language learners already possess would influence the mapping of semantic functions to morphemes.

Followed by studies that showed similar patterns for L2 acquisition, the view that the order of morpheme acquisition of English is consistent and relatively independent of the L1 has been dominant ever since, but recent studies have expressed results that challenge this view, and maintain that the morpheme acquisition order is at least partly L1-dependent. to this claim.

For example, these are reviewed by Ellis. They show that learners begin by omitting pronouns or using them indiscriminately: for example, using "I" to refer to all agents. Learners then acquire a single pronoun feature, often person, followed by number and eventually by gender. Little evidence of interference from the learner's first language has been found; it appears that learners use pronouns based entirely on their inferences about target language structure.

More recent studies have shown that universality and individuality coexist in the order of grammatical item acquisition. For example, a large-scale investigation was conducted on the acquisition of six English grammatical morphemes (articles, past tense, plural -s, possessive 's, progressive -ing, and third-person singular -s) among learner groups with seven different native languages: Japanese, Korean, Spanish, Russian, Turkish, German, and French. This study revealed that some grammatical items are heavily influenced by the learner's L1, while others are not. Specifically, items such as articles, tense, and the progressive aspect are particularly challenging for learners whose native languages, like Japanese and Korean, do not explicitly express these features. On the other hand, items like the third-person singular -s tend to be less influenced by the learner's native language.

Kasper and Rose also have thoroughly researched the sequence of acquisition of pragmatic features. In both fields, consistent patterns have emerged and have been the object of considerable theorizing.

== See also ==
- Second-language acquisition
