= Second-language acquisition =

Process of learning a second language

Second-language acquisition (SLA), second-language learning or L2 (language 2) acquisition, is the process of learning a language other than one's native language (L1). SLA research examines how learners develop their knowledge of a second language.

SLA research spans cognitive, social, and linguistic perspectives:

- Cognitive approaches investigate memory and attention processes.
- Sociocultural theories emphasize the role of social interaction and immersion.
- Linguistic studies examine the innate and learned aspects of language.

Individual factors like age, motivation, and personality also influence SLA, as seen in discussions on the critical period hypothesis and learning strategies. In addition to acquisition, SLA explores language loss, or second-language attrition, and the impact of formal instruction on learning outcomes.

== Definitions ==
Second language refers to any language learned in addition to a person's first language; although the concept is called second-language acquisition, it can also incorporate the learning of third, fourth, or subsequent languages. Second-language acquisition refers to what learners do; it does not refer to practices in language teaching, although teaching can affect acquisition. The term acquisition was originally used to emphasize the non-conscious nature of the learning process, (Note: Krashen (1982) made a sharp distinction between learning and acquisition, using learning to refer to the conscious aspects of the language learning process and acquisition to refer to the subconscious aspects. This strict separation of learning and acquisition is widely regarded as an oversimplification by researchers today, but his hypotheses were very influential and the name has stuck.) but in recent years learning and acquisition have become largely synonymous.

SLA can incorporate heritage language learning, but it does not usually incorporate bilingualism. Most SLA researchers see bilingualism as being the result of learning a language, not the process itself, and see the term as referring to native-like fluency. Writers in fields such as education and psychology, however, often use bilingualism loosely to refer to all forms of multilingualism. SLA is also not to be contrasted with the acquisition of a foreign language; rather, the learning of second languages and the learning of foreign languages involve the same fundamental processes in different situations.

== Research background ==
The academic discipline of second-language acquisition is a sub-discipline of applied linguistics. It is broad-based and relatively new. As well as the various branches of linguistics, second-language acquisition is also closely related to psychology and education. To separate the academic discipline from the learning process itself, the terms second-language acquisition research, second-language studies, and second-language acquisition studies are also used.

SLA research began as an interdisciplinary field; because of this, it is difficult to identify a precise starting date. However, two papers in particular are seen as instrumental to the development of the modern study of SLA: Pit Corder's 1967 essay The Significance of Learners' Errors and Larry Selinker's 1972 article Interlanguage. The field saw a great deal of development in the following decades. Since the 1980s, SLA has been studied from a variety of disciplinary and theoretical perspectives. In the early 2000s, some research suggested an equivalence between the acquisition of human languages and that of computer languages (e.g. Java) by children in the 5 to 11-year age window, though this has not been widely accepted amongst educators. Significant approaches in the field today are systemic functional linguistics, sociocultural theory, cognitive linguistics, Noam Chomsky's universal grammar, skill acquisition theory and connectionism.

There has been much debate about exactly how language is learned and many issues are still unresolved. There are many theories of second-language acquisition, but none are accepted as a complete explanation by all SLA researchers. Due to the interdisciplinary nature of the field of SLA, this is not expected to happen in the foreseeable future. Attempts have been made to provide a more unified account that tries to bridge first language acquisition and second language learning research.

== Language difficulty and learning time ==
The time taken to reach a high level of proficiency can vary depending on the language learned. For native English speakers, some estimates were provided by the Foreign Service Institute (FSI) of the U.S. Department of State—which compiled approximate learning expectations for several languages for its professional staff (native English speakers who generally already know other languages). Category I Languages include Italian and Swedish (24 weeks or 600 class hours) and French (30 weeks or 750 class hours). Category II Languages include German, Haitian Creole, Indonesian, Malay, and Swahili (about 36 weeks or 900 class hours). Category III Languages include Finnish, Polish, Russian, Tagalog, Vietnamese, and others (about 44 weeks or 1100 class hours).

Determining a language's difficulty can depend on a few factors, such as grammar and pronunciation. For instance, Norwegian is one of the easiest languages to learn for English speakers because its vocabulary shares many cognates and it has a sentence structure similar to English.

Of the 63 languages analyzed, the most difficult languages to reach proficiency in speaking and reading are Category IV Languages, which includes Arabic, Cantonese, Mandarin, Japanese, and Korean (88 weeks or 2200 class hours). The Foreign Service Institute and the National Virtual Translation Center both note that Japanese is typically more difficult to learn than other languages in this group.

There are other rankings of language difficulty, such as the one by The British Foreign Office Diplomatic Service Language Centre which lists the difficult languages in Class I (Cantonese, Japanese, Korean, Mandarin); the easier languages are in Class V (e.g. Afrikaans, Bislama, Catalan, French, Spanish, Swedish).

== Comparisons with first-language acquisition ==
Adults who learn a second language differ from children learning their first language in at least two ways: children are still developing their brains whereas adults have mature minds, and adults have at least a first language that orients their thinking and speaking. Although some adult second-language learners reach very high levels of proficiency, pronunciation tends to be non-native. This lack of native pronunciation in adult learners is explained by the critical period hypothesis. When a learner's speech plateaus, it is known as fossilization.

Also, when people learn a second language, the way they speak their first language changes in subtle ways. These changes can be with any aspect of language, from pronunciation and syntax to the gestures the learner makes and the language features they tend to notice. For example, French speakers who spoke English as a second language pronounced the /t/ sound in French differently from monolingual French speakers. This kind of change in pronunciation has been found even at the onset of second-language acquisition; for example, English speakers pronounced the English /p t k/ sounds, as well as English vowels, differently after they began to learn Korean. These effects of the second language on the first led Vivian Cook to propose the idea of multi-competence, which sees the different languages a person speaks not as separate systems, but as related systems in their mind. A 2025 study found that adult learners can attune to the prosody of a new language after brief exposure, but that concurrent exposure to orthography—especially deep or unfamiliar scripts—hampers this ability. This suggests that difficulties with second-language prosody may be influenced by learning conditions, not just age-related factors.

== Learner language ==
Originally, attempts to describe learner language were based on comparing different languages or analyzing learners' errors. However, these approaches could not fully predict all the errors learners make during the process of acquiring a second language. To address this limitation and explain learners’ systematic errors, the concept of interlanguage was introduced. Interlanguage refers to the linguistic system that emerges in the minds of second language learners. It is not considered a defective version of the target language riddled with random errors, nor is it purely a result of errors transferred from the learner’s first language. Instead, it is viewed as a language in its own right, with its own systematic rules. Most aspects of language—syntax, phonology, lexicon, and pragmatics—can be analyzed from the perspective of interlanguage. For more detailed information, please refer to the main articles on Interlanguage.

=== Sequences in the acquisition of English inflectional morphology ===
In the 1970s, several studies investigated the order in which learners acquired different grammatical structures. (Note: These studies were based on work by Brown (1973) on child first-language acquisition. The first such studies on child second-language acquisition were carried out by Dulay and Burt (1973, 1974a, 1974b, 1975). Bailey, Madden & Krashen (1974) investigated the order of acquisition among adult second-language learners. See Krashen (1977) for a review of these studies.) These studies showed that there was little change in this order among learners with different first languages. Furthermore, they showed that the order was the same for adults and children and that it did not even change if the learner had language lessons. This supported the idea that there were factors other than language transfer involved in learning second languages and was a strong confirmation of the concept of interlanguage.

1.	Plural -s	Girls go.
2.	Progressive -ing	Girls going.
3.	Copula forms of be	Girls are here.
4.	Auxiliary forms of be	Girls are going.
5.	Definite and indefinite articles the and a	The girls go.
6.	Irregular past tense	The girls went.
7.	Third person -s	The girl goes.
8.	Possessive 's	The girl's book.
A typical order of acquisition for English, according to Vivian Cook's 2008 book Second Language Learning and Language Teaching.

However, the studies did not find that the orders were the same. Although there were remarkable similarities in the order in which all learners learned second-language grammar, there were still some differences between individuals and learners with different first languages. It is also difficult to tell when exactly a grammatical structure has been learned, as learners may use structures correctly in some situations but not in others. Thus it is more accurate to speak of sequences of acquisition, in which specific grammatical features in a language are acquired before or after certain others but the overall order of acquisition is less rigid.

Recent studies have shown that universality and individuality coexist in the order of grammatical item acquisition. For example, items such as articles, tense, and the progressive aspect are particularly challenging for learners whose native languages, like Japanese and Korean, do not explicitly express these features. On the other hand, items like the third-person singular -s tend to be less influenced by the learner's native language. In contrast, articles and the progressive -ing have been confirmed to be strongly affected by the learners' native language. For more detailed information, please refer to the main articles on Order of acquisition.

=== Learnability and teachability ===
Learnability has emerged as a theory explaining developmental sequences that crucially depend on learning principles, which are viewed as fundamental mechanisms of interlanguage language acquisition within learnability theory. Some examples of learning principles include the uniqueness principle and the subset principle. The uniqueness principle refers to learners' preference for a one-to-one mapping between form and meaning, while the subset principle posits that learners are conservative in that they begin with the narrowest hypothesis space that is compatible with available data. Both of these principles have been used to explain children's ability to evaluate grammaticality despite the lack of explicit negative evidence. They have also been used to explain errors in SLA, as the creation of supersets could signal over-generalization, causing acceptance or production of ungrammatical sentences.

Pienemann's teachability hypothesis is based on the idea that there is a hierarchy of stages of acquisition and instruction in SLA should be compatible with learners' current acquisitional status. Recognizing learners' developmental stages is important as it enables teachers to predict and classify learning errors. This hypothesis predicts that L2 acquisition can only be promoted when learners are ready to acquire given items in a natural context. One goal of learnability theory is to figure out which linguistic phenomena are susceptible to fossilization, wherein some L2 learners continue to make errors despite the presence of relevant input.

=== Variability ===
Although second-language acquisition proceeds in discrete sequences, it does not progress from one step of a sequence to the next in an orderly fashion. There can be considerable variability in features of learners' interlanguage while progressing from one stage to the next. For example, in one study by Rod Ellis, a learner used both "No look my card" and "Don't look my card" while playing a game of bingo. A small fraction of variation in interlanguage is free variation, when the learner uses two forms interchangeably. However, most variation is systemic variation, a variation that depends on the context of utterances the learner makes. Forms can vary depending on the linguistic context, such as whether the subject of a sentence is a pronoun or a noun; they can vary depending on social contexts, such as using formal expressions with superiors and informal expressions with friends; and also, they can vary depending on the psycholinguistic context, or in other words, on whether learners have the chance to plan what they are going to say. The causes of variability are a matter of great debate among SLA researchers.

== Language transfer ==
One important difference between first-language acquisition and second-language acquisition is that the process of second-language acquisition is influenced by languages that the learner already knows. This influence is known as language transfer. (Note: The term language transfer is not without controversy, however. Sharwood Smith and Kellerman preferred the term crosslinguistic influence to language transfer. They argued that cross-linguistic influence was neutral regarding different theories of language acquisition, whereas language transfer was not. Sharwood Smith & Kellerman 1986, cited in Ellis 2008, p. 350.) Language transfer is a complex phenomenon resulting from the interaction between learners’ prior linguistic knowledge, the target language input they encounter, and their cognitive processes. Language transfer is not always from the learner’s native language; it can also be from a second language or a third. Neither is it limited to any particular domain of language; language transfer can occur in grammar, pronunciation, vocabulary, discourse, and reading.

== Factors and approaches ==
=== Cognitive factors ===
Much modern research in second-language acquisition has taken a cognitive approach. Cognitive research is concerned with the mental processes involved in language acquisition, and how they can explain the nature of learners' language knowledge. This area of research is based in the more general area of cognitive science and uses many concepts and models used in more general cognitive theories of learning. As such, cognitive theories view second-language acquisition as a special case of more general learning mechanisms in the brain. This puts them in direct contrast with linguistic theories, which posit that language acquisition uses a unique process different from other types of learning.

The dominant model in cognitive approaches to second-language acquisition, and indeed in all second-language acquisition research, is the computational model. The computational model involves three stages. In the first stage, learners retain certain features of the language input in short-term memory. (This retained input is known as intake.) Then, learners convert some of this intake into second-language knowledge, which is stored in long-term memory. Finally, learners use this second-language knowledge to produce spoken output. Cognitive theories attempt to codify both the nature of the mental representations of intake and language knowledge and the mental processes that underlie these stages.

In the early days of second-language acquisition research on interlanguage was seen as the basic representation of second-language knowledge; however, more recent research has taken several different approaches in characterizing the mental representation of language knowledge. Some theories hypothesize that learner language is inherently variable, and there is the functionalist perspective that sees the acquisition of language as intimately tied to the function it provides. Some researchers make the distinction between implicit and explicit knowledge, and some between declarative and procedural language knowledge. There have also been approaches that argue for a dual-mode system in which some language knowledge is stored as rules and other language knowledge as items.

Cognitive research shows L1 processing patterns do not always transfer directly. For instance, a large-scale study found native Czech speakers (whose L1 lacks number agreement attraction) nonetheless exhibited this processing error when tested in L2 English. This finding suggests L2 processing can be uniquely susceptible to interference, potentially due to higher working memory demands.

=== Sociocultural factors ===
From the early days of the discipline, researchers have also acknowledged that social aspects play an important role. Social interaction plays a significant role in second-language acquisition, as learners develop language skills through collaboration and communication with others.There have been many different approaches to the sociolinguistic study of second-language acquisition. Common to each of these approaches, however, is a rejection of language as a purely psychological phenomenon; instead, sociolinguistic research views the social context in which language is learned as essential for a proper understanding of the acquisition process.

Ellis identifies three types of social structures that affect the acquisition of second languages: sociolinguistic settings, specific social factors, and situational factors. Sociolinguistic setting refers to the role of the second language in society, such as whether it is spoken by a majority or a minority of the population, whether its use is widespread or restricted to a few functional roles, or whether the society is predominantly bilingual or monolingual. Ellis also includes the distinction of whether the second language is learned in a natural or an educational setting. Specific social factors that can affect second-language acquisition include age, gender, social class, and ethnic identity, with ethnic identity being the one that has received most research attention. Situational factors are those that vary between each social interaction. For example, a learner may use more polite language when talking to someone of higher social status, but more informal language when talking with friends.

A learner's sense of connection to their in-group, as well as to the community of the target language emphasizes the influence of the sociolinguistic setting, as well as social factors within the second-language acquisition process. Social Identity Theory argues that an important factor for second language acquisition is the learner's perceived identity to the community of the language being learned, as well as how the community of the target language perceives the learner. Whether or not a learner feels a sense of connection to the community or culture of the target language helps determine their social distance from the target culture. A smaller social distance is likely to encourage learners to acquire the second language, as their investment in the learning process is greater. Conversely, a greater social distance discourages attempts to acquire the target language. However, negative views not only come from the learner, but the community of the target language might feel greater social distance from the learner, limiting the learner's ability to learn the language. Whether or not bilingualism is valued by the culture or community of the learner is an important indicator of the motivation to learn a language.

There have been several models developed to explain social effects on language acquisition. Schumann's acculturation model proposes that learners' rate of development and ultimate level of language achievement is a function of the "social distance" and the "psychological distance" between learners and the second-language community. In Schumann's model, the social factors are most important, but the degree to which learners are comfortable with learning the second language also plays a role. Another sociolinguistic model is Gardner's socio-educational model, which was designed to explain classroom language acquisition. Gardner's model focuses on the emotional aspects of SLA, arguing that positive motivation contributes to an individual's willingness to learn L2; furthermore, the goal of an individual to learn an L2 is based on the idea that the individual has a desire to be part of a culture, in other words, part of a (the targeted language) mono-linguistic community. Factors, such as integrativeness and attitudes towards the learning situation drive motivation. The outcome of positive motivation is not only linguistic but non-linguistic, such that the learner has met the desired goal. Although Gardner's model has many critics, many of them have been influenced by its merits. The inter-group model proposes "ethnolinguistic vitality" as a key construct for second-language acquisition. Language socialization is an approach with the premise that "linguistic and cultural knowledge are constructed through each other", and saw increased attention after the year 2000. Finally, Norton's theory of social identity is an attempt to codify the relationship between power, identity, and language acquisition.

A unique approach to SLA is sociocultural theory. It was originally developed by Lev Vygotsky and his followers. Central to Vygotsky's theory is the concept of a zone of proximal development (ZPD). The ZPD notion states that social interaction with more advanced target language users allows one to learn a language at a higher level than if they were to learn a language independently. Sociocultural theory has a fundamentally different set of assumptions to approaches to second-language acquisition based on the computational model. Furthermore, although it is closely affiliated with other social approaches, it is a theory of mind and not of general social explanation of language acquisition. According to Ellis, "It is important to recognize... that this paradigm, despite the label 'sociocultural' does not seek to explain how learners acquire the cultural values of the L2 but rather how knowledge of an L2 is internalized through experiences of a sociocultural nature."

=== Linguistic factors ===
Linguistic approaches to explaining second-language acquisition spring from the wider study of linguistics. They differ from cognitive approaches and sociocultural approaches in that they consider linguistic knowledge to be unique and distinct from any other type of knowledge. The linguistic research tradition in second-language acquisition has developed in relative isolation from the cognitive and sociocultural research traditions, and as of 2010 the influence from the wider field of linguistics was still strong. Two main strands of research can be identified in the linguistic tradition: generative approaches informed by universal grammar, and typological approaches.

Typological universals are principles that hold for all the world's languages. They are found empirically, by surveying different languages and deducing which aspects of them could be universal; these aspects are then checked against other languages to verify the findings. The interlanguages of second-language learners have been shown to obey typological universals, and some researchers have suggested that typological universals may constrain interlanguage development.

The theory of universal grammar was proposed by Noam Chomsky in the 1950s and has enjoyed considerable popularity in the field of linguistics. It focuses on describing the linguistic competence of an individual. He believed that children not only acquire language by learning descriptive rules of grammar; he claimed that children creatively play and form words as they learn language, creating meaning for the words, as opposed to the mechanism of memorizing language. The "universals" in universal grammar differ from typological universals in that they are a mental construct derived by researchers, whereas typological universals are readily verifiable by data from world languages.

Universal grammar theory can account for some of the observations of SLA research. For example, L2 users often display knowledge about their L2 that they have not been exposed to. L2 users are often aware of ambiguous or ungrammatical L2 units that they have not learned from any external source, nor their pre-existing L1 knowledge. This unsourced knowledge suggests the existence of a universal grammar. Another piece of evidence that generative linguists tend to use is the poverty of the stimulus, which states that children acquiring language lack sufficient data to fully acquire all facets of grammar in their language, causing a mismatch between input and output. The fact that children are only exposed to positive evidence yet have intuition about which word strings are ungrammatical may also be indicative of universal grammar. However, L2 learners have access to negative evidence as they are explicitly taught about ungrammaticality through corrections or grammar teaching.

== Individual variation ==
Individual factors, such as language aptitude, age, strategy use, motivation, and personality, play a significant role in second-language acquisition. For example, the critical period hypothesis explores how age affects language learning ability, while motivation is often categorized into intrinsic and extrinsic types. Personality traits, such as introversion and extroversion, and differences in cognitive style and individuals' use of effective learning strategies can also influence language acquisition outcomes.

== Attrition ==
Second-language attrition refers to the loss of proficiency in a language that was previously acquired, often due to a lack of use or exposure. Factors influencing attrition include the level of initial proficiency, age, social circumstances, and motivation. A learner's L2 is not suddenly lost with disuse, but its communicative functions are slowly replaced by those of the L1.

Similar to second-language acquisition, second-language attrition occurs in stages. However, according to the regression hypothesis, the stages of attrition occur in reverse order of acquisition. With acquisition, receptive skills develop first, and then productive skills, and with attrition, productive skills are lost first, and then receptive skills.

== Classroom second-language acquisition ==
Second-language acquisition (SLA) research is the scientific discipline devoted to studying how second-languages are acquired. Consequently, research that evaluates the effectiveness of teaching methods is often not considered part of SLA research. Nevertheless, there have been attempts to apply SLA research findings to teaching methods, and this area is referred to as classroom second language acquisition or instructed second language acquisition (ISLA). This research has a significant overlap with language education, and it is mainly concerned with the effect that instruction has on the learner. Moreover, it also explores what teachers do, the classroom context, and the dynamics of classroom communication.

Second-language learners face several challenges during practical training, especially regarding training environments, aligning tasks with learning objectives, and cultural and economic influences. Cited in Ellis 1994 It is generally agreed that pedagogy restricted to teaching grammar rules and vocabulary lists does not give students the ability to use the L2 with accuracy and fluency. Rather, to become proficient in the second language, the learner must be given opportunities to use it for communicative purposes. This aligns with Krashen's input hypothesis, which proposes that language acquisition occurs exclusively through "comprehensible input" (exposure to the language) rather than explicit instruction.

More recent research in instructed second-language acquisition has expanded on this communicative perspective by emphasizing the role of task-based and interaction-driven approaches in classroom learning. Task-based language teaching (TBLT) is an approach that prioritizes meaning-focused communication while still drawing learners’ attention to linguistic form during task performance. Within this approach, tasks provide opportunities for learners to engage their natural abilities for language use through meaningful interaction. Tasks are also understood as reflecting real-world language use, rather than activities designed for the practice of specific linguistic forms.Research on task-based performance has further examined development in terms of complexity, accuracy, and fluency (CAF) and its relation to task conditions and performance factors in instructional contexts.

Interaction also plays an important role in how learning develops during task-based communication. Loewen and Sato (2018) describe interaction as central to second-language development and characterize it in terms of processes such as input, negotiation for meaning, and learner output. Corrective feedback is treated as a central component of this interaction, as it can draw learners’ attention to linguistic form during communication. In classroom settings, peer interaction provides opportunities for learners to engage in these processes, and learners who provide feedback—such as prompts and recasts—have been shown to improve in both accuracy and fluency.

== Theories ==
Numerous theories have been proposed not only to describe the phenomena of SLA but also to explain them by uncovering the underlying mechanisms. Despite differing perspectives, these research approaches share a common goal: contributing to the identification of conditions that facilitate effective language acquisition. Recognizing the contributions of each perspective and fostering interdisciplinary connections, researchers have increasingly sought to understand the complex process of second language acquisition from a broader perspective in recent years. These efforts go beyond the limitations of explaining SLA through a single theory, paving the way for a more comprehensive and multilayered understanding. Major theoretical perspectives include behaviorist, cognitive, and sociocultural approaches to second-language acquisition.

== Journals ==
Major journals of the field include Second Language Research, Language Learning, Studies in Second Language Acquisition, Applied Linguistics, Applied Psycholinguistics, International Review of Applied Linguistics in Language Teaching, International Journal of Applied Linguistics, System, Journal of Second Language Studies, and Journal of the European Second Language Association.

== See also ==
- Bilingualism (neurology)
- Dynamic approach to second language development
- International auxiliary language
- Language learning aptitude
- Language acquisition
- Language complexity
- List of common misconceptions about language learning
- List of language acquisition researchers
- Native-language identification
- One person, one language
- Psycholinguistics
- Second-language attrition
- Sociolinguistics
- Theories of second-language acquisition
- Vocabulary learning

== Bibliography ==
- Allwright, Dick; Hanks, Judith (2009). The Developing Language Learning: An Introduction to Exploratory Practice. Basingstoke: Palgrave MacMillan. ISBN 978-1-4039-8531-6.
- Anderson, J. R. (1992). "Automaticity and the ACT* theory". American Journal of Psychology. 105 (2): 165–180. doi:10.2307/1423026. JSTOR 1423026. PMID 1621879.
- Ashcraft, M. H.; Kirk, E. P. (2001). "The relationships among working memory, math anxiety and performance". Journal of Experimental Psychology: General. 130 (2): 224–237. doi:10.1037/0096-3445.130.2.224. PMID 11409101.
- Bailey, N.; Madden, C.; Krashen, S. D. (1974). "Is there a "natural sequence" in adult second language learning?". Language Learning. 24 (2): 235–243. doi:10.1111/j.1467-1770.1974.tb00505.x.
- Bates, E.; MacWhinney, B. (1981). "Second-Language Acquisition from a Functionalist Perspective: Pragmatic, Semantic, and Perceptual Strategies". Annals of the New York Academy of Sciences. 379 (1): 190–214. Bibcode:1981NYASA.379..190B. doi:10.1111/j.1749-6632.1981.tb42009.x. S2CID 86330898.
- Brown, Roger (1973). A First Language. Cambridge: Harvard University Press. ISBN 978-0-674-30325-6.
- Canale, M.; Swain, M. (1980). "Theoretical bases of communicative approaches to second language teaching and testing". Applied Linguistics. 1 (1): 1–47. doi:10.1093/applin/1.1.1 (inactive 16 August 2026). hdl:11059/14798.
- Chang, Charles B. (2012). "Rapid and multifaceted effects of second-language learning on first-language speech production". Journal of Phonetics. 40 (2): 249–268. doi:10.1016/j.wocn.2011.10.007.
- Cook, Vivian (2016). Second Language Learning and Language Teaching. Abingdon, Oxon: Routledge. ISBN 978-0-415-71377-1.
- DeKeyser, Robert (1998). "Beyond focus on form: Cognitive perspectives on learning and practicing second language grammar". In Doughty, Catherine; Williams, Jessica (eds.). Focus on Form in Classroom Second Language Acquisition. New York: Cambridge University Press. pp. 42–63. ISBN 978-0-521-62390-2.
- Doughty, Catherine; Williams, Jessica, eds. (1998). Focus on Form in Classroom Second Language Acquisition. Cambridge: Cambridge University Press. ISBN 978-0-521-62390-2.
- Dulay, H. C.; Burt, M. K. (1973). "Should we teach children syntax?". Language Learning. 23 (2): 245–258. doi:10.1111/j.1467-1770.1973.tb00659.x.
- Dulay, Heidi; Burt, Marina (1974). "Natural sequences in child second language acquisition". Language Learning. 24: 37–53. doi:10.1111/j.1467-1770.1974.tb00234.x.
- Dulay, Heidi; Burt, Marina (1974). "You can't learn without goofing". In Richards, Jack (ed.). Error Analysis. New York: Longman. pp. 95–123. ISBN 978-0-582-55044-5.
- Dulay, Heidi; Burt, Marina (1975). "Creative construction in second language learning and teaching". In Dulay, Heidi; Burt, Marina (eds.). On TESOL '75: New Directions in Second Language Learning, Teaching, and Bilingual Education: Selected Papers from the Ninth Annual TESOL Convention, Los Angeles, California, March 4–9, 1975. Washington, DC: Teachers of English to Speakers of Other Languages. pp. 21–32. OCLC 1980255.
- Elley, W. B. (1991). "Acquiring Literacy in a Second Language: the Effect of Book-Based Programs". Language Learning. 41 (3): 375–411. doi:10.1111/j.1467-1770.1991.tb00611.x.
- Ellis, N. C. (1998). "Emergentism, Connectionism and Language Learning". Language Learning. 48 (4): 631–664. CiteSeerX 10.1.1.473.5374. doi:10.1111/0023-8333.00063.
- Ellis, Rod (1993). "Second language acquisition and the structural syllabus". TESOL Quarterly. 27 (1): 91–113. doi:10.2307/3586953. JSTOR 3586953.
- Ellis, Rod (1994). The Study of Second Language Acquisition. Oxford Oxfordshire: Oxford University Press. ISBN 978-0-19-437189-6.
- Ellis, Rod (1997). Second Language Acquisition. Oxford Introductions to Language Study. Oxford, New York: Oxford University Press. ISBN 978-0-19-437212-1.
- Ellis, Rod (2002). "Does form-focused instruction affect the acquisition of implicit knowledge?". Studies in Second Language Acquisition. 24 (2): 223–236. doi:10.1017/s0272263102002073. S2CID 145684013.
- Ellis, Rod; Barkhuizen, Patrick (2005). Analysing Learner Language. Oxford: Oxford University Press. ISBN 978-0-19-431634-7.
- Ellis, Rod (2009). The Study of Second Language Acquisition. Oxford, UK: Oxford University Press. ISBN 978-0-19-442257-4.
- Erton, I. (2010). "Relations between personality traits, language learning styles and success in foreign language achievement". Hacettepe University Journal of Education. 38: 115–126.
- Flege, James Emil (1987). "The production of "new" and "similar" phones in a foreign language: evidence for the effect of equivalence classification" (PDF). Journal of Phonetics. 15: 47–65. doi:10.1016/S0095-4470(19)30537-6.
- Gass, S.; Glew, M. (2008). "Second language acquisition and bilingualism". In Altarriba, J.; Heredia, R. (eds.). An Introduction to Bilingualism: Principles and Processes. New York: Taylor & Francis Group. ISBN 978-0-8058-5135-9.
- Gass, Susan; Selinker, Larry (2008). Second Language Acquisition: An Introductory Course. New York, NY: Routledge. ISBN 978-0-8058-5497-8 – via Google Books.
- Hansen, Lynne (1999). Second Language Attrition in Japanese Contexts. New York, NY: Oxford University Press. ISBN 978-0-19-512304-3.
- Harley, B. (1989). "Functional Grammar in French Immersion: A Classroom Experiment". Applied Linguistics. 10 (3): 331–360. doi:10.1093/applin/10.3.331.
- Haynes, Judie (2007). Getting Started With English Language Learners: How Educators Can Meet the Challenge. Alexandria, VA: Association for Supervision and Curriculum Development. ISBN 978-1-4166-0519-5.
- Klein, Wolfgang and Perdue, Clive The Basic Variety (or: Couldn’t natural languages be much simpler?). In Second Language Research 13, 1997, pp. 301-347.
- Kohnert, K. (2008). "Primary Language Impairments in Bilingual Children and Adults". In Altarriba, J.; Heredia, R. (eds.). An Introduction to Bilingualism: Principles and Processes. New York: Taylor & Francis Group. pp. 295–320. ISBN 978-0-8058-5135-9.
- Krashen, Stephen (1977). "Some issues relating to the monitor model". In Brown, H; Yorio, Carlos; Crymes, Ruth (eds.). Teaching and learning English as a Second Language: Trends in Research and Practice: On TESOL '77: Selected Papers from the Eleventh Annual Convention of Teachers of English to Speakers of Other Languages, Miami, Florida, April 26 – May 1, 1977. Washington, DC: Teachers of English to Speakers of Other Languages. pp. 144–158. OCLC 4037133.
- Krashen, Stephen (1981a). Second Language Acquisition and Second Language Learning. New York: Pergamon Press. ISBN 978-0-08-025338-1. Archived from the original on October 19, 2008.
- Krashen, Stephen (1981b). "The "fundamental pedagogical principle" in second language teaching". Studia Linguistica. 35 (1–2): 50–70. doi:10.1111/j.1467-9582.1981.tb00701.x.
- Krashen, Stephen (1982). Principles and Practice in Second Language Acquisition. Pergamon Press. ISBN 978-0-08-028628-0. Archived from the original on March 12, 2012.
- Krashen, Stephen (1994). "The input hypothesis and its rivals". In Ellis, Nick (ed.). Implicit and Explicit Learning of Languages. London: Academic Press. pp. 45–77. ISBN 978-0-12-237475-3.
- Krashen, Stephen (2004). The Power of Reading, Second Edition. Littleton: Libraries Unlimited. ISBN 978-1-59158-169-7.
- Lenneberg, Eric (1967). Biological Foundations of Language. New York: Wiley. ISBN 978-0-89874-700-3.
- Lightbown, Patsy (1990). "Chapter 6: Process-product research on second language learning in classrooms". In Harley, Birgit (ed.). The Development of Second Language Proficiency. Cambridge, New York: Cambridge University Press. pp. 82–92. ISBN 978-0-521-38410-0.
- Lightbown, Patsy; Spada, Nina (1990). "Focus-on-Form and Corrective Feedback in Communicative Language Teaching: Effects on Second Language Learning". Studies in Second Language Acquisition. 12 (4): 429–48. doi:10.1017/S0272263100009517. S2CID 144068806.
- Lightbown, Patsy M.; Spada, Nina (2006). How Languages Are Learned (3rd ed.). Oxford, New York: Oxford University Press. ISBN 978-0-19-442224-6.
- Loewen, Shawn; Reinders, Hayo (2011). Key Concepts in Second Language Acquisition. Basingstoke: Palgrave Macmillan. ISBN 978-0-230-23018-7.
- Long, M. (1996). "The role of the linguistic environment in second language acquisition". In Ritchie, William; Bhatia, Tej (eds.). Handbook of Second Language Acquisition. San Diego: Academic Press. pp. 413–468. ISBN 978-0-12-589042-7.
- Long, M. H. (2007). Problems in SLA. Mahwah, NJ: Lawrence Erlbaum Associates.
- Lyster, R.; Ranta, L. (1997). "Corrective feedback and learner uptake: Negotiation of form in communicative classrooms". Studies in Second Language Acquisition. 19: 37–66. doi:10.1017/s0272263197001034. S2CID 67829334.
- Lyster, R.; Mori, H. (2006). "Interactional feedback and instructional counterbalance". Studies in Second Language Acquisition. 28 (2): 269–300. doi:10.1017/s0272263106060128. S2CID 17775491.
- MacIntyre, Peter D.; Gardner, R. C. (1991). "Language anxiety: Its relationship to other anxieties and to processing in native and foreign language". Language Learning. 41 (4): 513–534. doi:10.1111/j.1467-1770.1991.tb00691.x.
- MacWhinney, Brian (1987). "Applying the Competition Model to bilingualism" (PDF). Applied Psycholinguistics. 8 (4): 315–327. doi:10.1017/S0142716400000357. S2CID 143185516. Archived from the original (PDF) on 2011-07-21.
- MacWhinney, B. (2005). "Extending the Competition Model". International Journal of Bilingualism. 9: 69–05. doi:10.1177/13670069050090010501. S2CID 143600103.
- Paradis, M. (1994). "Neurolinguistic aspects of implicit and explicit memory: Implications for bilingualism and SLA". In Ellis, Nick (ed.). Implicit and Explicit Learning of Languages. London: Academic Press. pp. 393–420. ISBN 978-0-12-237475-3.
- Penfield, Wilder; Roberts, Lamar (1959). Speech and Brain Mechanisms. Princeton: Princeton University Press. ISBN 978-0-691-08039-0.
- Piasecka, L. (2011). "Current views on foreign language reading motivation". In Arabski, Janusz; Wojtaszek, Adam (eds.). Individual Learner Differences in SLA. North York, ON: Multilingual Matters. ISBN 978-1-84769-434-8.
- Piechurska-Kuciel, E. (2011). "A Study of Gender-Related Levels of Processing Anxieties over Three Years of Secondary Grammar School Instruction". In Arabski, Janusz; Wojtaszek, Adam (eds.). Individual Learner Differences in SLA. North York, ON: Multilingual Matters. ISBN 978-1-84769-434-8.
- Pinter, Annamaria (2011). Children Learning Second Languages. Basingstoke, UK: Palgrave Macmillan. ISBN 978-1-4039-1185-8.
- Prabhu, N. (1987). Second Language Pedagogy. Oxford: Oxford University Press. ISBN 978-0-19-437084-4.
- Rounds, P. L.; Kanagy, R. (1998). "Acquiring linguistic cues to identify AGENT: Evidence from children learning Japanese as a second language". Studies in Second Language Acquisition. 20 (4): 509–542. doi:10.1017/s0272263198004033. S2CID 145606326.
- Schmidt, R. (2001). "Attention". In Robinson, Peter (ed.). Cognition and Second Language Instruction. Cambridge: Cambridge University Press. pp. 1–32. ISBN 978-0-521-80288-8.
- Selinker, L. (1972). "Interlanguage". International Review of Applied Linguistics. 10 (1–4): 209–241. doi:10.1515/iral.1972.10.1-4.209.
- Siegel, Jeff (2003). "Social Context". In Doughty, Catherine; Long, Michael (eds.). The handbook of second language acquisition. Malden, MA: Blackwell. ISBN 978-0-631-21754-1.
- Skehan, Peter (1998). A Cognitive Approach to Language Learning. Oxford: Oxford University Press. ISBN 978-0-19-437217-6.
- Solé, Yolanda Russinovich (1994). "The Input Hypothesis and the Bilingual Learner". The Bilingual Review. 19 (2): 99–110. JSTOR 25745211.(registration required)
- Studenska, A. (2011). "Personality and parenting styles as predictors of self-regulation in foreign language learning". In Arabski, Janusz; Wojtaszek, Adam (eds.). Individual Learner Differences in SLA. North York (ON): Multilingual Matters. ISBN 978-1-84769-434-8.
- Swain, Merrill (1991). "French immersion and its offshoots: Getting two for one". In Freed, Barbara (ed.). Foreign language acquisition research and the classroom. Lexington, MA: Heath. pp. 91–103. ISBN 978-0-669-24263-8.
- Swain, Merrill (1995). "Three functions of output in second language learning". In Cook, Guy (ed.). Principle & Practice in Applied Linguistics: Studies in Honour of H.G. Widdowson. Oxford: Oxford University Press. pp. 125–144. ISBN 978-0-19-442147-8.
- Tarone, Elaine; Bigelow, Martha; Hansen, Kit (2009). Literacy and Second Language Oracy. Oxford: Oxford University Press. ISBN 978-0-19-442300-7.
- Tarone, Elaine; Swierzbin, Bonnie (2009). Exploring Learner Language. Oxford: Oxford University Press. ISBN 978-0-19-442291-8.
- Tokowicz, Natasha (2015). Lexical Processing and Second Language Acquisition. New York, NY: Taylor & Francis. ISBN 978-0-415-87755-8.
- VanPatten, Bill; Williams, Jessica, eds. (2015). Theories in second language acquisition: An introduction. New York: Routledge. ISBN 978-0-415-82421-7.
- VanPatten, Bill; Benati, Alessandro G. (2010). Key Terms in Second Language Acquisition. London: Continuum. ISBN 978-0-8264-9914-1.
- Vega, Luis, A (2008). Social Psychological Approaches to Bilingualism. New York, NY: Taylor and Francis. ISBN 978-0-8058-5135-9.
- Watson-Gegeo, Karen Ann; Nielsen, Sarah (2003). "Language Socialization in SLA". In Doughty, Catherine; Long, Michael (eds.). The handbook of second language acquisition. Malden, MA: Blackwell. ISBN 978-0-631-21754-1.
- Yuan, F.; Ellis, R. (2003). "The Effects of Pre-Task Planning and On-Line Planning on Fluency, Complexity and Accuracy in L2 Monologic Oral Production". Applied Linguistics. 24: 1–27. doi:10.1093/applin/24.1.1.
