= J. Marvin Brown =

American linguist (1925–2002)

- Born: January 28, 1925
- Died: August 29, 2002 (aged 77)
- Occupation: Linguist

Academic background
- Education: Ph.D. in linguistics, Cornell University, 1962
- Thesis: From Ancient Thai to Modern Dialects: A Theory (1962)

James Marvin Brown (January 28, 1925 – August 29, 2002) was an American linguist who studied the evolution of Thai and related languages, supervised the teaching of English and Thai at AUA Language Center, Bangkok, Thailand and developed the Automatic Language Growth approach to language teaching.

== Early life ==
Brown was born in 1925 to Lawrence M. Brown and Fannie D. Brown (née Parker). He grew up in Salt Lake City, Utah.

== Education ==
Brown studied Mandarin Chinese as an officer in the United States Navy during World War II. After working in U.S. Naval Intelligence in Washington, D.C., where he translated Chinese telegrams, he returned to the University of Utah to study on the G.I. Bill and became a member of Sigma Pi fraternity. In order to extend his studies, he transferred to the University of California. There he began studying Thai under linguist Mary Haas, who had been teaching the language on the Berkeley campus in the Army Specialized Training Program. He earned a Bachelor of Arts degree with honors in Oriental languages, followed by a Master of Arts degree. He began a Ph.D. in linguistics on a scholarship at the University of California, but moved to Cornell University after J Milton Cowan asked him to teach a planned course in Thai there when William J. Gedney became unavailable. At Cornell he taught Thai and continued his doctoral studies with the Cornell Southeast Asia Program.

In 1953 Brown left for Bangkok to continue his research on Thai linguistics and study of the Thai language and remained in Thailand for four years, funded by grants from the Ford Foundation. Returning to Cornell in 1957, he continued his dissertation work there and taught Thai and Burmese. The next year he obtained a Fulbright Fellowship and returned to Thailand to teach linguistics and English in order to train Thai teachers of English, followed by research for his dissertation. Brown had been working on an analysis of Thai grammar, but with time running out he changed to a historical study involving reconstructing ancient Thai from modern dialects. With students from every province of Thailand attending the teacher training college where he had taught, Brown wrote that he was able to obtain the pronunciations of over 1000 words in each of 70 dialects without difficulty. He returned to Cornell in 1960 to teach Thai and Burmese as a teaching fellow and use the data he had collected to reconstruct the phonology of ancient Thai. Brown refused the offer of an assistant professor position at Cornell, having decided to return to Thailand instead.

Brown completed his dissertation and received his doctorate from Cornell around January 1962. It was published in 1965 as From Ancient Thai to Modern Dialects by Social Science Association of Thailand Press and has been republished in subsequent years with other writings by Brown about historical Thai linguistics and his theories about phonology.

== AUA Language Center ==
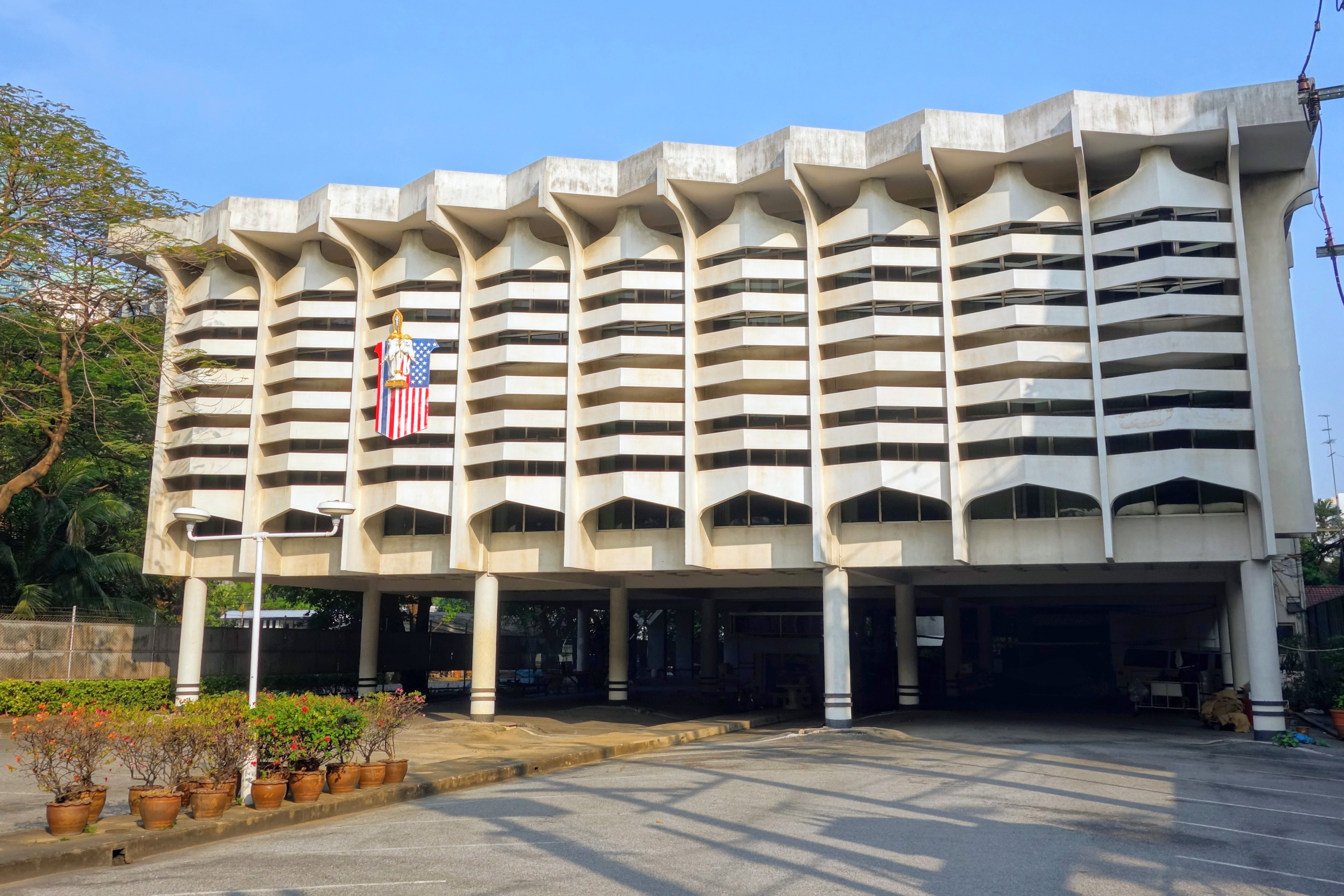
AUA Language Center

Brown returned to Bangkok in March 1962 and was hired as staff linguist at American University Alumni Language Center (AUA) by Gordon F. Schmader, whom he had worked alongside at Cornell writing books to teach English to Thais and Burmese respectively. These texts were based on the "General Form", which AUA had been using to teach English since it had opened in 1952.

As staff linguist at AUA, Brown oversaw the teaching of English to Thais and Thai to foreigners. His work included developing English teaching materials and techniques and training new English teachers. He prepared textbooks to teach Thai to foreigners, producing a popular three-volume course on the spoken language, intended for classroom use with a native speaker of Thai, and books on reading and writing Thai.

Brown left AUA in 1980 to study physics at the University of Utah. He returned to AUA in 1984 and began the teaching of Thai using his version of the natural approach, which he would develop into Automatic Language Growth.

== Automatic Language Growth ==
Brown is notable for originating the Automatic Language Growth (ALG) approach to language teaching, which claims that adults can effortlessly become near-native or native-like in second languages if they learn them implicitly through experience, without consciously practicing speaking. Brown came to believe that, contrary to the critical period hypothesis that adults have lost the ability to learn languages as children do, adults actually retain this ability but obstruct it by using abilities they have gained to consciously study, practice, and analyze language.

"[Brown's] goal had always been to find a way for an adult to become native in their second language," says David Long, the coordinator of the AUA Thai Program. Beginning with his study of Thai under Mary Haas using the Army Method, also known as the audiolingual method, Brown sought to prove the effectiveness of study and practice to this end. However, he described being confounded by observations over his years in Thailand of people who had studied Thai for fewer hours than him achieving fluency in less time, while others who had studied more than him taking longer to become fluent. At AUA, Brown devised elaborate drills for Thai learners with the goal of having them speak correct English without thinking, but found that these had no effect on real language use.

During the 1970s, Brown was influenced by thinkers such as William T. Powers, taking from his perceptual control theory "that language learning must consist of looking and listening, not practicing," and Timothy Gallwey, from whose Inner Game writings he "saw that thinking just got in the way of performance." Nevertheless, he persisted with trying to achieve fluency in language through conscious practice. While studying physics at the University of Utah, Brown studied Japanese with drills and practice of speeches, but found that "[n]ot a single sentence was ever triggered by a thought." He described hitting "rock bottom" after teaching a Japanese class to use the same method he had used and learning from the students' reviews that "they all hated [him] and [his] practice."

Brown experienced a "sudden conversion" upon reading a copy of The Natural Approach by Stephen Krashen and Tracy Terrell that his colleague Adrian S. Palmer gave him the next day. "In 1983, I first came across Krashen's idea that we acquire languages by understanding messages, and in no other way," recalled Brown. "The thing that caught my attention was 'and in no other way.' I was pretty well sold on understanding happenings, but now I could consider ruling out everything else. No memorizing, no practicing, no speaking!"

In 1984, Brown began teaching language using a comprehension approach of listening to comprehensible input, starting with the following semester's Japanese class, then a natural approach Thai class. He returned to Bangkok to give a demonstration term of natural approach Thai to students and observers funded by the United States Information Agency, and was hired by AUA to give natural approach classes along with the regular structural approach classes.

From the start, Brown's version of the natural approach at AUA differed from that of Krashen and Terrell in significant ways. There was no speaking practice on the part of students, in accordance with Krashen's input hypothesis that "speaking ability emerges on its own after enough competence has been developed by listening and understanding". "We're trying to find out what will happen if we hold strictly to this part of Krashen's theory," Brown and Palmer wrote in 1988 in The Listening Approach, naming the book after what they called the approach at that time. Therefore, Brown extended to hundreds of hours the silent period where students were not to speak until they could produce language spontaneously, without conscious effort.

Brown's approach also had two teachers speaking to one another in front of the class, which allowed students to observe interaction in the target language without speaking it themselves. "[S]tudents watched two or three Thais act out easy-to-understand scenarios describing Thai customs." wrote author Cleo Odzer of the natural approach Thai classes at AUA in the late 1980s.

According to Brown, students who adhered to the long silent period by first listening to Thai for hundreds of hours without trying to speak were able to surpass the level of fluency he had achieved after several decades in Thailand within just a few years, without study or practice, while other students who tried to speak from the beginning found themselves "struggling with broken Thai like all long-time foreigners." In Brown's view, trying to speak the language before developing a clear mental image through listening had permanently damaged their ability to produce the language like a native speaker.

Brown also reported that students who refrained from speaking but still asked questions about the language, took notes, or looked up words all failed to surpass his level of ability, and some of those who refrained from speaking and all these things still failed to surpass him. In order to experience his version of the natural approach for himself, Brown attempted to learn the Shantou dialect of Chinese by setting up classes with the same format of the AUA natural approach Thai classes. He found that as a linguist he was unable to stop himself from analyzing the language he was hearing, and said this interfered with developing the ability to use the language like a native speaker.

From his experience and observations Brown concluded that, contrary to the critical period hypothesis for second language acquisition, where adults have lost the ability that children have to learn languages to a native-like level without apparent effort, adults actually obstruct this ability when learning a new language through using abilities they have gained to consciously practice and think about language.

== Later life ==
Brown retired from AUA in 1995 and returned to the United States. He died on August 29, 2002, at the age of 77.

Brown wrote an autobiography, From the Outside In, detailing his life as a linguist and the development of ALG. This was published posthumously on the Education Resources Information Center (ERIC), an online library sponsored by the Institute of Education Sciences of the United States Department of Education. A longer version was subsequently published on the ALG World website with chapters on Brown's theories about physics, the brain, and other topics.

== Languages ==
"I’ve been trying to learn languages and teach them all my life," Brown wrote in the preface of his autobiography. "I spent the war trying to learn [Mandarin] Chinese, and I spent the next 50 years trying to learn 20 more languages and trying to teach two."

Brown studied Latin in high school and French, Spanish, and Italian in the late 1940s at the University of Utah. He both studied and taught Thai and Burmese at Cornell. He had also studied German and Indonesian. When he taught Thai and English at AUA using his structural approach, he studied Vietnamese to remind him how it felt for students who were beginners at Thai. Returning to the University of Utah in the early 1980s, he studied Japanese and again studied Mandarin. In the 1990s he attempted to learn the Shantou dialect of Chinese by setting up classes that were like his AUA natural approach Thai classes.

According to Brown, while his ability in Thai was reputed as "legendary" and he could be mistaken for a native speaker over the phone, unlike his native English, he had to consciously monitor his production to speak Thai correctly. "When I speak Thai, I think in Thai," he wrote. "When I speak English, I think only in thought—I pay no attention to English." Brown claimed that, in contrast, the ALG approach of implicit learning without study or practice can produce adults who fluently speak a second language like a native speaker without conscious attention to language.

== Works ==
- Brown, J. M. (2003). From the Outside In: The Secret to Automatic Language Growth. Online Submission.
- Brown, J. M. (1992). Learning languages like children. Unpublished manuscript.
- Brown, J. M., & Palmer, A. S. (1988). The Listening Approach: Methods and Materials for Applying Krashen's Input Hypothesis. Longman.
- Brown, J. M. (1985). From Ancient Thai to Modern Dialects: and other writings on historical Thai linguistics. White Lotus Company.
- Brown, J. Marvin (1983). "Powers's Loop and a Neural Theory of Language". In Agard, Frederick B., Kelley, Gerald, Makkai, Adam, and Makkai, Valerie Becker (eds.) Essays in Honor of Charles F. Hockett. Leiden: E. J. Brill. pp. 59–84.
- Brown, J. M., & Xu, Y. (1983). Speaking Chinese in China. Guilford: Yale University Press.
- Brown, J. M. (1979). AUA Language Center Thai course: reading and writing (Vol. 1). American University Alumni Association Language Center.
- Brown, J. M. (1979). Vowel length in Thai. Studies in Tai and Mon-Khmer Phonetics and Phonology In Honour of Eugénie JA Henderson, ed. Theraphan. L-Thongkum et al, 10-25.
- Brown, J. M. (1976). Thai dominance over English and the learning of English by Thais. Pasaa, 6(1–2), 67-85.
- Brown, J. M. (1976). Dead consonants or dead tones? Thomas W. Gething, Jimmy G. Harris and Pranee Kullavanijaya (eds.), Tai Linguistics in Honor of Fang-Kuei Li, Bangkok: Chulalongkorn University Press, 28-38.
- Brown, J. M. (1975). The great tone split: did it work in two opposite ways. Studies in Tai linguistics in honor of William J. Gedney, 33-48.
- Brown, J. M. (1967). A.U.A. Language Center Thai Course, Books 1–3. Bangkok: American University Alumni Association Language Center.
- Brown, J. M. (1966). The language of Sukhothai: Where did it come from? And where did it go?. Social Science Review, 3, 40-42.
- Brown, J. M. (1965). From Ancient Thai to Modern Dialects. Bangkok: Social Science Association of Thailand Press.
- Brown, J. M. (1962). From Ancient Thai to Modern Dialects: A Theory. PhD dissertation, Cornell University.
