= TPR Storytelling =

Method of teaching foreign languages

TPR Storytelling (Teaching Proficiency through Reading and Storytelling or TPRS) is a method of teaching foreign languages. TPRS lessons use a mixture of reading and storytelling to help students learn a foreign language in a classroom setting. The method works in three steps: in step one the new vocabulary structures to be learned are taught using a combination of translation, gestures, and personalized questions; in step two those structures are used in a spoken class story; and finally, in step three, these same structures are used in a class reading. Throughout these three steps, the teacher will use a number of techniques to help make the target language comprehensible to the students, including careful limiting of vocabulary, constant asking of easy comprehension questions, frequent comprehension checks, and very short grammar explanations known as "pop-up grammar". Many teachers also assign additional reading activities such as free voluntary reading, and there have been several easy novels written by TPRS teachers for this purpose.

Proponents of TPR Storytelling, basing their argument on the second language acquisition theories of Stephen Krashen, hold that the best way to help students develop both fluency and accuracy in a language is to expose them to large amounts of comprehensible input. The steps and techniques in TPR Storytelling help teachers to provide this input by making the language spoken in class both comprehensible and engaging. In addition, TPR Storytelling uses many concepts from mastery learning. Each lesson is focused on three vocabulary phrases or fewer, enabling teachers to concentrate on teaching each phrase thoroughly. Teachers also make sure that the students internalize each phrase before moving on to new material, giving additional story lessons with the same vocabulary when necessary.

TPR Storytelling is unusual in that it is a grassroots movement among language teachers. After being developed by Blaine Ray in the 1990s, the method has gained popular appeal with language teachers who claim that they can reach more students and get better results than they could with previous methods. It is enjoying increasing attention from publishers and academic institutions. A number of practitioners publish their own materials and teaching manuals, and training in TPR Storytelling is generally offered at workshops by existing TPRS teachers rather than at teacher training college.

== History ==
TPR Storytelling was developed by Blaine Ray, a high school Spanish teacher in California, during the 1990s. Ray had had initial success teaching using total physical response (TPR), but was disappointed when his students stopped finding this technique to be interesting. Ray was familiar with Stephen Krashen's theories, and he was confident that his students would acquire Spanish naturally if he gave them enough comprehensible input. He set about finding a way to combine TPR with stories, with input from Krashen and from other foreign language teachers, and the result was Total Physical Response Storytelling.

This new method continued to evolve with the input of teachers, and by 2000 there was a greater emphasis on reading and the spoken class story, with the time spent doing traditional TPR being reduced. To reflect these changes, the TPRS acronym was changed to stand for Teaching Proficiency through Reading and Storytelling. TPR Storytelling is now trademarked by Blaine Ray.

Although TPR Storytelling is a growing movement among foreign language teachers, particularly in the United States, it has received little coverage in academia. (Note: In Cook (2008, p. 32) TPR Storytelling receives only a passing mention, despite there being an entire chapter devoted to language teaching styles and methods (Cook 2008, pp. 235–72).) In the United States the method has gained support from some language teachers, and some school districts use it exclusively in their foreign language programs. It has also been used in language revitalization programs. In Jerusalem, Israel TPR Storytelling has been adapted by The Polis Institute, a school for ancient languages and the humanities. In adapting the strategy of storytelling, the Polis Method excludes translations and explanations in any language other than the one being taught.

== Method ==
TPR Storytelling is broadly divided into three steps, with each being regarded as essential for a successful program.

=== Step one: establish meaning ===
In this step the students are introduced to the new vocabulary phrases for the lesson. There is no set number of new items to be introduced in a given session; however, three is generally considered the maximum number that can be effectively taught in a lesson. Limiting the phrases like this allows the teacher to focus on them and provide many repetitions for the students. This emphasis on thoroughly learning new material is designed to give the students a feeling of confidence and to provide sufficient repetitions to facilitate acquisition (unconscious control in recognition and output) of the new items.

The three phrases (structures) are written on the blackboard, or another place where the students can easily see them, and are translated into the students' native language if a shared native language is available. If students forget what a phrase means, they can glance at the board and check the meaning at any time.

The teacher may elect to practice the new phrases using gestures, in a style modeled after traditional TPR. This gives the students the chance to get used to how the phrases sound before hearing them in context. It is also intended to keep the atmosphere of the class relaxed and conducive to learning.

Then the teacher asks questions about the students using the target phrases. These questions are known as Personalized Questions and Answers (PQA). To ensure these questions are comprehensible to the students, the teacher uses a variety of techniques and comprehension checks. Depending on the responses from the students and the atmosphere of the class, these questions might lead into a scene or skit often referred to as extended PQA. The details discovered by the teacher from PQA are often used as the basis for the class story.

The goal of the teacher during step one is to provide as many spoken repetitions of the new structures in context as possible. This lays the foundation for student recognition of the structures during the storytelling time.

=== Step two: spoken class story ===
In step two, students hear the three structures many times in the context of a spoken class story. This story is usually short, simple, and interesting, and will contain multiple instances of the target structures used in context. The number of times the structures are heard is further increased by the circling questioning technique. TPRS teachers aim to say each new structure at least 50 times in the course of a story, and it is not unusual to hear those structures 100 times.

The teacher will usually use a skeleton script with very few details, and then flesh the story out using details provided by the students in the target language, making a personalized story for each class. Using the circling technique, teachers can ask for these new details while still keeping the target language comprehensible. Advanced TPRS teachers are able to improvise, creating stories solely based on student answers to questions about the day's vocabulary structures. The focus is always on the target structures, allowing the details to support those structures.

The actions in the story may be acted out by volunteers from the class. When the teacher makes a statement that advances the story plot, the actors will act out that statement and then wait while the teacher continues with the circling questions.

The story will often take place in distinct locations. The main character in the story may start off in one location with a problem that they need to solve. They may move to a second location, where they try to solve the problem, but fail. Then they may move to a third location where they resolve the problem. This narrative device is used to maximize the repetitions of the target structures, to make the story easy to understand, and to make the target phrases easy to remember. "Keeping space", or having students or the teacher physically move to locations in the classroom that represent the various locations in the story, is an aid to students in understanding the action and language they are hearing.

After the story has finished the teacher may retell it in briefer form, retell it with errors having students correct them, or ask the students to retell the story, allowing them to use the structures they just learned. This can be in pairs, in groups, or one student retelling in front of the class.

=== Step three: reading ===
Step three is where the students learn to read the language structures that they have heard in steps one and two. A number of reading activities are used in TPRS. The first, and most common, is a class reading, where the students read and discuss a story that uses the same language structures as the story in step two. The next most common activity is free voluntary reading, where students are free to read any book they choose in the language being learned. The other activities are shared reading and homework reading. For shared reading, as in first-language literacy activities, the teacher brings in a children's picture book, and reads it to the students in class, making it comprehensible through circling and other means. Homework reading, as the name implies, means assigning specific reading for students to do at home. All readings in TPRS are comprehensible to the students, which means a very low ratio of unknown words (if any).

==== Class reading ====
The class reading is the most common type of reading activity in TPR Storytelling. TPRS teachers will typically include a class reading as part of every TPRS lesson sequence. This reading is based on the story that the students learned in step two - sometimes it can be the same story, and sometimes it uses the same language structures but with different content. Ideally, the story should be structured so that students will be able to understand most of the story on first view.

The teacher will often begin the class reading by reading aloud the story, or a portion of the story, then having the students translate it into their first language. This translation could be done with individual students, or by the whole class. Translation is utilized selectively in this way as a direct method of ensuring an accurate understanding of the language meaning. This process aims to ensure that all of the students understand all of the words in the reading, as well as the meaning of the reading as a whole.

Next, the class will discuss the reading in the target language. With the goal of making the discussion 100% comprehensible, the teacher will use the same TPRS techniques as in step two. Also, the teacher may make use of the pop-up grammar technique, where grammar points contained in the reading are explained very briefly - in 5 seconds or less. A limited number of grammar points are focused on in any particular reading and they are "popped up" frequently to enhance student retention. The discussion can touch on a wide range of topics related to the reading.

==== Free voluntary reading ====
Many TPRS teachers include Free voluntary reading (FVR) in their foreign language programmes. The research for FVR is very strong, and has consistently shown that FVR is as good or better than taught language lessons. Free voluntary reading can be done in the classroom or at home, but many teachers prefer to focus on spoken stories in class, as it is hard for students to get listening input outside school.

==== Shared reading ====
Shared reading, often called "Kindergarten Day", refers to the practice of the teacher reading a children's picture storybook to the students. The name is intended to conjure up the image of being read to as a child, but the activity can be done with any age group.

==== Homework reading ====
As the name implies, this is a specific reading that is assigned to all students for homework. The teacher can give a quiz on the reading when the students get back to class.

== Techniques ==
Many smaller teaching techniques are key to the success of TPR Storytelling. They range from the simple, such as speaking slowly or paying close attention to the students' eyes, to the complex, like the circling technique of asking questions. These techniques all have the same basic aim of keeping the class comprehensible, interesting, and as efficient as possible for language acquisition.

=== Circling ===
Example of circling "Dave wants a Ferrari."
- Statement Teacher: Class, Dave wants a Ferrari! Students: Ooooh! "Yes" question Teacher: Does Dave want a Ferrari? Students: Yes. Either/Or question Teacher: Does Dave want a Ferrari or a Mini Cooper? Students: Ferrari. "No" question Teacher: Class, does Dave want a Mini Cooper? Students: No. "Wh" question Teacher: Class, what does Dave want? Students: Ferrari.

"Circling" is the practice of asking a series of simple questions about a statement, all in the target language. It is intended to provide repetition of the target vocabulary in context and enable students to learn the vocabulary, grammar and phonology of their new language in a holistic way. There are four basic types of circling questions: "yes" questions, "no" questions, either/or questions, and "wh" questions such as what, where, when, and how many. There are also more advanced circling techniques which teachers can optionally include, such as the "three for one" and false statements. The teacher expects a response from the students after each statement or question, to check whether they have understood. If the teacher says a statement, then the students show that they understand by responding with an expression of interest such as "Oooh!" or "Aaaaah". If the teacher asks a question, then the students answer the question.

The students can answer the questions with just one or two words. The point of asking these questions is not to force the students to speak; rather, the questions are a method of checking comprehension while simultaneously repeating the target vocabulary in context. Therefore, students need not worry about speaking in full sentences, and indeed this would detract from the process of concentrating on the input provided by the teacher. By answering using single words or very short phrases the students can keep their attention focused on the words to be learned.

Circling questions are always about content that has already been established. If a question is about something not yet established, then it is not considered a circling question. Consider the example on the right, "Dave wants a Ferrari." The following questions all ask for details not already established in the statement "Dave wants a Ferrari", and so are not examples of circling questions:

- Teacher: Why does Dave want a Ferrari?
- Teacher: Where does Dave want to drive his Ferrari?

=== Staying in bounds ===
Staying in bounds means only using words that the students understand. Words that are in bounds are:

- Words that all the students have already learned
- Cognates
- Proper nouns that the students know

Any words not in the list above are considered "out-of-bounds". Teachers must be on constant alert to keep their language in bounds. If a teacher does say something out-of-bounds, then the solution is to make it comprehensible, by writing it on the board and translating it immediately. If a teacher can stay in bounds all the time, and can speak slowly enough for the students to understand, then their class will be 100% comprehensible. This helps the students become confident in their language abilities and motivates them to succeed.

=== Slow ===
Even if students know the words that the teacher says, they will not understand if the teacher speaks too quickly. By speaking slowly, teachers give students more time to process the language and therefore they have more chance of understanding. When students first hear vocabulary or grammar, the necessary gap between each word can be as long as two full seconds. As students get used to the language structures, the teacher can slowly increase the speed.

=== Comprehension checks ===
The most direct way of finding out if students understand the language is to ask them what it means. In TPR Storytelling, teachers check comprehension early and often. There are a few ways of doing this:

Time-out sign
The teacher agrees on a sign for the students to use if they don't understand something. This is intended to save them from being embarrassed about not knowing something they think everybody else understands.
Finger count
The students hold up their fingers to show how much they understand. Ten fingers means they understood 100%, seven fingers means they understood 70%, five fingers means 50%, etc.
"What does <INSERT WORD HERE> mean?"
The teacher asks the students what specific words mean. Teachers generally use this after they asked a circling question but didn't get a strong response. This question is usually asked in the students' first language, to ensure understanding.
"What did I just say?"
The teacher asks the students "What did I just say?" in the students' first language. This way the students can be sure of the full meaning of the sentence or question they just heard. This should not be used as an attempt to catch students out; rather it is just a check to remind students of something they cannot remember at that moment.

=== Pop-up grammar ===
"Pop-up grammar" is the practice of making very short grammar explanations about the specific vocabulary students are learning at that moment. This technique is most often used in the class reading of step three, but it can be used at any time. The teacher draws the students' attention to a grammatical feature of one of the sentences they have been learning in the story, and explains it in five seconds or less. This brevity is intended to keep focus on the meaning of the language as much as possible.

=== Personalization ===
Personalizing the language class is a key way to make the target language interesting and meaningful for students, and personalization is used extensively in TPR Storytelling. A personalized message is much more likely to be comprehensible and interesting than one that is not personalized. Using this in classes can be as easy as asking students simple questions about their lives in the target language. Other good personalization techniques are the use of celebrities or of other characters the students know (such as the school principal).

=== Teach to the eyes ===
Teaching to the eyes is a way of connecting with students while talking to them in the foreign language. More importantly, looking the students directly in the eyes while speaking gives the teacher a good indication of whether or not they understand what is being said. As the name suggests, to do this teachers will look into the eyes of individual students while they teach. Teachers are encouraged to choose one student and talk to them directly. After they have finished talking to that student, they can pick another student in a different part of the room to talk to. Focusing attention on individual students like this helps teachers to assess student comprehension levels, and also keeps the teacher's intonation conversational and interesting. It is also helpful in preventing problems with discipline. Students' eyes will reveal if they understand or if there needs to be more clarification.

== Teaching materials ==
A number of teaching materials have been developed for use with TPR Storytelling. There are books of suggested lesson plans, manuals explaining TPRS methodology, listening material, substitute DVDs, and many target language readers by a variety of authors and publishers. These readers have been translated into multiple languages and include appropriate cultural references for each target language. These materials are generally written by TPRS teachers themselves; so far, the large publishing companies have been reluctant to publish materials that aren't based upon a fixed grammar syllabus. Small TPRS publishers like Command Performance Language Institute, TPRS Books, Fluency Fast, Fluency Matters, Chalkboard Productions and Albany Language Learning/Squid For Brains are appearing to fill the need for materials to fit the TPRS community. Newer, self-published novels can be found on Mike Peto's blog.

== Conferences ==
There are three main U.S. conferences for TPRS teachers: NTPRS, which focuses on TPRS, and IFLT, which focuses on general comprehensible-input based instruction, and Comprehended World Languages, which focuses on TPRS/TCI and provides a lab teaching option. NTPRS stands for National TPRS. These conferences take place every year in the United States.

== Theory ==
TPR Storytelling is based on two key theoretical pillars: the input hypothesis, and mastery learning.

=== Input hypothesis ===
The Input Hypothesis, proposed by Dr. Stephen Krashen, suggests that language development is a function of the input received by the learner. Krashen asserts that there are two distinct ways of learning language: language "learning" and language "acquisition". Language "learning" is learning that takes conscious effort on the part of the learner. It is characterized by learning grammar rules, memorizing vocabulary lists, and performing speaking drills. Language "acquisition" is learning that is subconscious and takes little or no effort on the part of the learner. It is characterized by listening to and understanding messages, reading interesting books and articles, and other enjoyable activities that take place in the language being learned. According to Krashen's theory, the only thing that can lead to fluency in the language is language "acquisition". Language "learning" can only be used as a way to consciously edit speech or writing, and it is never the cause of spontaneous, unrehearsed speech or writing.

In light of this theory, TPRS teachers spend the vast majority of their class time on input-based activities. The table below shows the activities used in TPR Storytelling, and whether they encourage language learning, language acquisition, or both. The activities that include a language learning component all take up a relatively short amount of class time. On the other hand, the pure acquisition activities take up large amounts of time. For typical TPRS classes, the ratio works out at about 5% of time spent on learning and 95% of time spent on acquisition.

Language "learning" and "acquisition" in TPRS activities
Activity	"Learning" or "acquisition"
Translation of new vocabulary	Learning
Learning vocabulary through gestures	Both
Personalized Questions and Answers	Acquisition
Spoken class story	Acquisition
Translating class reading	Both
Class discussion of reading	Acquisition
Pop-up grammar	Learning
Free voluntary reading	Acquisition
Kindergarten day	Acquisition
Homework reading	Acquisition

==== The affective filter ====
Another key component of Krashen's theory is the affective filter. The affective filter hypothesis states that language is more easily acquired when people are relaxed and open to learning. On the other hand, if people are experiencing negative emotions such as anxiety, self-doubt, and boredom, language is much less likely to be acquired.

For this reason TPRS teachers always try to make students look good in the stories and discussions. For example, an otherwise average student could be given the role of a star baseball pitcher in a class story. It is usually considered good form to make celebrities look bad in comparison to the students. The class story in question might see the pitcher winning a game against an all-star team of professional batters, ideally in a humorous way. This use of humor and making the students look good is built on the idea that students learn language better when they are enjoying themselves.

=== Mastery learning ===
Mastery learning is a method of instruction in which students thoroughly learn all material they are studying. Students do not progress on to learning new material until they have mastered current material. This gives students a feeling of control, and indeed, of mastery. In language learning this is particularly important, as this feeling of control is directly related to the ability to learn. This is demonstrated by Krashen's research on the "affective filter".

The mastery approach to learning manifests itself in TPR Storytelling in many ways. Firstly, the number of new vocabulary phrases to be learned in each lesson is usually no more than three. More words than this may be introduced during the lesson, but the three phrases are the only ones that the students will be expected to know. Secondly, these vocabulary phrases are repeated many, many times, in context, using the "circling" technique. This repetition helps the students to internalize the words thoroughly. In addition, the same words are used during the class reading, giving even more repetition. If after this the students still aren't comfortable with the target words, the teacher can simply tell a new story using the same vocabulary phrases in the next lesson. Thirdly, teachers will try as far as possible to review all previously covered vocabulary in every lesson, finding ways to work the old vocabulary structures into class stories and class discussions.

== Research ==
In addition to the research backing up the general theoretical foundations of TPR Storytelling, that is, Krashen's Input Hypothesis, there exist some studies dealing with TPRS specifically. The results of these studies indicate that TPR Storytelling may be more efficient, in some cases, than more traditional methods, like the Audio-Lingual Method (ALM). Todd McKay (2000) conducted the first empirical study of the effectiveness of Total Physical Response (TPR) combined with storytelling. Stories had been incorporated into TPR as early as 1972. In the comparative study with Asher, McKay found that children who were exposed to TPR Storytelling outperformed similar students trained using grammar-translation and ALM. The ability of those students to comprehend a never before heard story was statistically (p-value of 0.001) greater than that of the control group. This study can be found in Asher's Learning Another Language Through Actions and in McKay's TPR Storytelling Teacher's Guidebook. In another example, Garczynski (2003) followed two groups of students over a six-week period, one of which was taught with TPR Storytelling, and the other of which was taught with the audio-lingual method. Both groups of students learned the same vocabulary from the same textbook. The students who learned with TPR Storytelling scored slightly higher than the students who learned with the audio-lingual method, and the TPR Storytelling students showed a much greater rate of improvement than their ALM peers. However, ALM was a method that lost popularity in the late 1950s, when it was strongly criticized for its lack of "scientific credibility and it was only a matter of time before the effectiveness of the method itself was questioned." (Wikipedia: Audio-lingual method.) It should be clarified that TPRS, which stands for "Teaching Proficiency through Reading and Storytelling, is not directly associated with "Total Physical Response (TPR) in spite of the similarity of their names. James Asher, the creator of TPR in the 1960s, did compare his TPR with ALM with results showing TPR superiority over ALM. Asher's study was performed in 1977, when it was still pertinent to compare new methods like TPR with old ones like ALM. Comparing TPRS, created in the 90s, with ALM, created in the 1960s, is not pertinent anymore. Not all research studies suggest a significant advantage for TPR Storytelling.

== Glossary ==
There are a number of terms that teachers use when talking about TPR Storytelling. Some of these are standard terms in teaching and others are specific to TPRS.

- Acquisition. This refers to the subconscious process of becoming fluent in a language. This term was popularized by Stephen Krashen, and is often contrasted with language learning, which Krashen uses to refer to the conscious process of learning a language. He argues that conscious language learning does not result in fluency.
- Barometer or barometer student. This is the student who has the most difficulty understanding the language in any given class, but who is actively trying. Teachers should go slow enough for this student to understand.
- CI - Comprehensible input. This refers to language which the students can understand.
- Circling. The practice of asking many easy questions about a statement. See the circling section above.
- Four-percenters. The estimated four percent of learners who choose to sign up for advanced courses, beyond the basic requirements to get into accredited colleges.
- FVR - Free voluntary reading. This means reading books for pleasure, without deadlines or assessments. See the free voluntary reading section above.
- Home-run story. This is a class story that goes particularly well. It is often a cause for celebration among teachers new to TPR Storytelling.
- Kindergarten day. This is the practice of teachers reading picture books to their students. See the kindergarten day section above.
- Parking. This is when the teacher stays focused on one sentence and gets many repetitions of the target vocabulary, rather than moving quickly through the story.
- Passive PMS. This is an outdated way of referring to PQA (Personalized questions and answers).
- PMS - Personalized mini-situation. This refers to the spoken class story of step two.
- Pop-ups or pop-up grammar. This refers to giving very short grammar explanations, usually five seconds or less. See the pop-up grammar section above.
- PQA - Personalized questions and answers. This is the practice of asking questions to the students about their lives using the day's vocabulary structures. It is part of step one.
- Reps - Repetitions.
- Staying in bounds. This means only using words that the students know. See the Staying in bounds section above.
- Teach to the eyes. This is the practice of looking in students' eyes when talking to them, considered essential for building rapport. See the teach to the eyes section above.
- TPR - Total Physical Response. A language teaching method invented by Dr. James Asher where students respond to commands given in the target language.
- TPRS - Teaching Proficiency through Reading and Storytelling. The subject of this article. It is a language teaching method originally based on Total Physical Response, but that has evolved a separate methodology.

== See also ==
- Total Physical Response
- Comprehensible input
- Second language acquisition

== Bibliography ==
- Asher, James (2000). Learning Another Language Through Actions (6th ed.). Sky Oaks. ISBN 1-56018-502-3.
- Cantoni, Gina (1999). "5: Using TPR-Storytelling to Develop Fluency and Literacy in Native American Languages". In Reyhner, Jon; Cantoni, Gina; St. Clair, Robert; et al. (eds.). Revitalizing Indigenous Languages. Northern Arizona University, College of Education. pp. 53–58. ISBN 0-9670554-0-7.
- Cook, Vivian (2008). Second Language Learning and Language Teaching. London: Arnold. ISBN 978-0-340-95876-6.
- Decker, Beth (2008-12-03). "Body Language: The Effectiveness of Total Physical Response Storytelling in Secondary Foreign Language Instruction" (PDF). Macalester College.
- Garczynski, Marissa (2003). Teaching Proficiency through Reading and Storytelling: Are TPRS students more fluent in second language acquisition than Audio Lingual students? (dissertation). Chapman University. AAT EP30485ProQuest 305220990.
- Krashen, Stephen (2004). The power of reading: insights from the research (2nd ed.). Heinemann. ISBN 978-1-59158-169-7.
- Ray, Blaine; Seely, Contee (2004). Fluency Through TPR Storytelling: Achieving Real Language Acquisition in School (4th ed.). Command Performance Language Institute, Blaine Ray Workshops. ISBN 0-929724-21-6.
- Slavic, Ben (2007a). TPRS in a Year! (3rd ed.). OCLC 461311718.
- Slavic, Ben (2007b). PQA in a Wink! (2nd ed.).
- Suwila, Premsrirat; Malone, Dennis (2003-11-06). Language development and language revitalization in Asia (PDF). Language Development, Language Revitalization and Multilingual Education in Minority Communities in Asia. SIL International. Archived from the original (PDF) on 2011-07-28.
