= Harris Winitz =

American linguist

- Born: 1933 (age 92–93)
- Occupations: Linguist, educational researcher
- Title: Professor emeritus

Academic background
- Education: University of Iowa (MA, PhD)

Academic work
- Discipline: Linguist
- Sub-discipline: Second-language acquisition
- Institutions: University of Missouri, Kansas City

Harris Winitz (born 1933) is professor emeritus at the University of Missouri, Kansas City where he taught courses in psycholinguistics, phonetics, acoustic phonetics, and language pathology and conducted research in second language learning.

== Background ==
Winitz received his MA and Ph.D. in the areas of child language, speech language pathology, and psychology from the University of Iowa.

== Contribution ==
He is best known as one of the chief developers of the comprehension method of language learning along with James Asher, Tracy Terrell and Stephen Krashen.

The comprehension approach is based on observations of first language acquisition by infants and children:

1) A silent period when only hearing and observation are used for language input; no production (other than babbling for mouth and tongue training.

2) Children acquire their first language by observing and comprehending the language addressed to them as part of their daily activities.

3) The daily activities take the form of scripts in which words and grammatical units are presented to reflect cognitive representations of language grammars, such as present, past, and future time, plurality, direct and indirect object, etc.

4) Parents talk to young children in short sentences using concrete terms and show the meaning of words by pointing to objects and defining events through imitation and actions.

5) Children hear over 15 million sentences by age 5 when the underlying formulations of their language are acquired.

Winitz developed the Comprehension Approach by using the above principles (and others) adapted for the adult language learner.

1) Students remain silent through a course of instruction that can last two or three years.

2) They do not learn explicit grammatical principles and they do not practice sentences in drills.

3) They acquire the meaning of words by looking at carefully presented pictures according to a language script that begins with short sentences and simple cognitive and language concepts.

4) The language sentences are presented by computer during which students hear thousands of sentences over relatively brief periods of time.

5) They do not hear other students' sentences which usually are said incorrectly with inaccurate pronunciation patterns.

6) An extensive vocabulary is taught through the use of word fields. For example, when learning the word "big", they also acquire the many words in the second language for the word field big, such as enormous, wide, spacious, extend, giant, etc. All are presented in pictorial format and as part of a particular script

== Research ==
Many of the principles have been tested in research studies and classrooms.

In 1975, he pioneered the use of computers for both development and testing.

He is a proponent of the avoidance of drills.

In contrast to received wisdom, he found that teaching vocabulary by theme (all names of fruits for example) causes confusion. Vocabulary should be thematically unrelated.

Reviews of the theory and practice of the Comprehension Approach by Judith and Norman Gary are to be found in

== Implementation ==
The principles of the Comprehension Approach have been implemented in a system called the Learnables produced by the International Linguistics, a company that Winitz founded in the 1970s.
