= Silent period =

Second-language acquisition phase

The silent period (also called pre-production period) is a phase reported to have been observed in second-language acquisition where the learner does not yet produce but is actively processing the L2 (second language). This silent period has been claimed to be typically found in children and has been called the second stage of second language acquisition, following the use of L1 (native language) and preceding productive use of L2, and can last between a few weeks to a year. Generalizing how long this period may last is nearly impossible because it depends on many personal and individual variables that come into play.

While the silent period has received much endorsement from researchers and educators, some argue against the validity of such a period. There are debates surrounding its significance in language acquisition, of how language teachers should address such a period in school curriculum, and what exactly language learners are processing (or not) during such a period. The phenomena of the silent period is a theory attributed to Stephen D. Krashen.

== Controversy ==
There is controversy as to whether there is such a defined silent period of active learning. Studies in support of a silent period have used variable methods and definitions of silence. Some define it as the absence of any L2, while others define it as the absence of productive syntax in L2. Moreover, these studies were conducted across variable settings, and report a big range in the length of silent periods. Ultimately, even if these studies did properly establish a non-verbal phase, there is still a lack of evidence that it involves active learning, as opposed to general incomprehension or shyness.

The general concept of the silent period also seems at odds with the communicative nature of language and language acquisition.

== In language teaching ==
Strategies teachers can use to help children who are in the silent period include: asking the child to teach the teacher words in their language, having children draw a picture of their family and then asking them for details, watching the children on the playground to see if there is any verbalization outside of the classroom, having the children use their bodies to mime what they want to communicate, and asking children to draw what they are trying to say.

General support for a silent period of active learning leads to certain implications in language teaching. Educators are less likely to expect engagement from L2 learners early on in acquisition, and might not try to elicit speech from L2 learners. However, if the silent period is not empirically founded, or if it reflects general incomprehension or shyness rather than active learning, then these pedagogical methods have to be reevaluated.

The silent period has been used in language teaching methods such as Total Physical Response, the natural approach, and Automatic Language Growth.
