= Natural approach =

Method of language teaching

The natural approach is a method of language teaching developed by Stephen Krashen and Tracy Terrell in the late 1970s and early 1980s. The Natural Approach has been used in ESL classes as well as foreign language classes for people of all ages and in various educational settings, from primary schools to universities. It aims to foster naturalistic language acquisition in the classroom setting by emphasizing communication and limiting conscious grammar study and explicit correction of student errors. Efforts are also made to make the learning environment as stress-free as possible, by lowering the affective filter. In the natural approach, language output is not forced, but allowed to emerge spontaneously after students have attended to large amounts of comprehensible language input. Comprehensible input is the content that language learners are exposed to in the target language. Krashen suggests that language learners should be able to understand the comprehensible input provided at their current levels of language acquisition, while also making it as interesting and engaging as possible.

== Background ==
The natural approach was originally created in 1977 by Terrell, a Spanish teacher in California, who wished to develop a style of teaching based on the findings of naturalistic studies of second-language acquisition. After the original formulation, Terrell worked with Krashen to further develop the theoretical aspects of the method. Terrell and Krashen published the results of their collaboration in the 1983 book The Natural Approach.

The natural approach was strikingly different from the mainstream approach in the United States in the 1970s and early 1980s, the audio-lingual method. While the audio-lingual method prized drilling and error correction, these things disappeared almost entirely from the natural approach. Terrell and Krashen themselves characterized the natural approach as a "traditional" method and contrasted it with grammar-based approaches, which they characterized as new inventions that had "misled" teachers.

The natural approach shares many features with the direct method (itself also known as the "natural method"), which was formulated around 1900 and was also a reaction to grammar-translation. Both the natural approach and the direct method are based on the idea of enabling naturalistic language acquisition in the language classroom; they differ in that the natural approach puts less emphasis on practice and more on exposure to language input and on reducing learners' anxiety.

== Outline ==
The aim of the natural approach is to develop communicative skills, and it is primarily intended to be used with beginning learners. It is presented as a set of principles that can apply to a wide range of learners and teaching situations, and concrete objectives depend on the specific context in which it is used. Terrell outlines three basic principles of the approach:

- "Focus of instruction is on communication rather than its form."
- "Speech production comes slowly and is never forced."
- "Early speech goes through natural stages (yes or no response, one- word answers, lists of words, short phrases, complete sentences.)"

These principles result in classrooms where the teacher emphasizes interesting, comprehensible input and low-anxiety situations. Lessons in the natural approach focus on understanding messages in the foreign language, and place little or no importance on error correction, drilling or on conscious learning of grammar rules. They also emphasize learning of a wide vocabulary base over learning new grammatical structures. In addition, teachers using the natural approach aim to create situations in the classroom that are intrinsically motivating for students.

Terrell sees learners going through three stages in their acquisition of speech: comprehension, early speech, and speech emergence. In the comprehension stage Terrell focuses on students' vocabulary knowledge. His aim is to make the vocabulary stick in students' long-term memory, a process which he calls binding. Terrell sees some techniques as more binding than others; for example, the use of gestures or actions, such as in total physical response, is seen to be more binding than the use of translation.

According to Terrell, students' speech will only emerge after enough language has been bound through communicative input. When this occurs, the learners enter the early speech stage. In this stage, students answer simple questions, use single words and set phrases, and fill in simple charts in the foreign language. In the speech emergence stage, students take part in activities requiring more advanced language, such as role-plays and problem-solving activities.

== Theory ==
Although Terrell originally created the natural approach without relying on a particular theoretical model, his subsequent collaboration with Krashen has meant that the method is often seen as an application to language teaching of Krashen's monitor model. Krashen outlined five hypotheses in his model:

1. The acquisition-learning hypothesis. This states that there is a strict separation between conscious learning of language and subconscious acquisition of language, and that only acquisition can lead to fluent language use.
2. The monitor hypothesis. This states that language knowledge that is consciously learned can only be used to monitor output, not to generate new language. Monitoring output requires learners to be focused on the rule and to have time to apply it.
3. The input hypothesis. This states that language is acquired by exposure to comprehensible input at a level a little higher than that the learner can already understand. Krashen names this kind of input "i+1".
4. The natural order hypothesis. This states that learners acquire the grammatical features of a language in a fixed order, and that this is not affected by instruction.
5. The affective filter hypothesis. This states that learners must be relaxed and open to learning in order for language to be acquired. Learners who are nervous or distressed may not learn features in the input that more relaxed learners would pick up with little effort.

Despite its basis in Krashen's theory, the natural approach does not adhere to the theory strictly. In particular, Terrell perceives a greater role for the conscious learning of grammar than Krashen. Krashen's monitor hypothesis contends that conscious learning has no effect on learners' ability to generate new language, whereas Terrell believes that some conscious learning of grammar rules can be beneficial.

== Syllabus ==
Terrell outlines four categories of classroom activities that can facilitate language acquisition (as opposed to language learning):

- "Content (culture, subject matter, new information, reading, e.g. teacher tells interesting anecdote involving contrast between target and native culture.)"
- "Affective-humanistic (students' own ideas, opinions, experiences, e.g. students are asked to share personal preferences as to music, places to live, clothes, hair styles, etc.)"
- "Games [focus on using language to participate in the game, e.g. 20 questions: I, the teacher, am thinking of an object in this room. You, students, have twenty questions to guess the object. Typical questions: is it clothing? (yes) is it for a man or a woman? (woman) is it a skirt? (yes) is it brown? (yes) is it Ellen's skirt? (yes)]"
- "Problem solving (focus on using language to locate information, use information, etc., e.g. looking at this listing of films in the newspaper, and considering the different tastes and schedule needs in the group, which film would be appropriate for all of us to attend, and when?)"

== Reception ==
The natural approach enjoyed much popularity with language teachers, particularly with Spanish teachers in the United States. Markee (1997) puts forward four reasons for the success of the method. First, he says that the method was simple to understand, despite the complex nature of the research involved. Second, it was also compatible with the knowledge about second-language acquisition at the time. Third, Krashen stressed that teachers should be free to try the method, and that it could go alongside their existing classroom practices. Finally, Krashen demonstrated the method to many teachers' groups, so that they could see how it would work in practice. The natural approach has become closely associated with Krashen's monitor model, and it is often seen as an application of the theory to language teaching. Despite this perception, there are some differences, particularly Terrell's view that some degree of conscious grammar study can be beneficial.

== Bibliography ==
- Dhority, Lynn (1991). The ACT Approach: The Use of Suggestion for Integrative Learning. Philadelphia, PA: Gordon and Breach Science Publishers. ISBN 978-2881245565.
- Hall, Graham (2011). Exploring English Language Teaching: Language in Action. London, New York: Routledge. ISBN 978-0-415-58415-9.
- Markee, Numa (1997). Managing Curricular Innovation. Cambridge, New York: Cambridge University Press. ISBN 978-0-521-555241.
- Ohmaye, Ehio (1998). "Simulation-Based Language Learning: An Architecture and a Multi-Media Authoring Tool". In Schrank, Roger (ed.). Inside Multi-Media Case Based Instruction. Mahwah, New Jersey: Routledge. pp. 1–102. ISBN 978-0-8058-2538-1.
- Richards, Jack; Rodgers, Theodore (2001). Approaches and Methods in Language Teaching (2nd ed.). Cambridge, New York: Cambridge University Press. ISBN 978-0521008433.
- Richards, Jack C.; Schmidt, Richard, eds. (2010). Longman Dictionary of Language Teaching and Applied Linguistics. New York: Longman. ISBN 978-1-4082-0460-3.
