= Focal Skills =

Focal Skills (or The Focal Skills Approach) refers to a specific non-traditional program design and assessment regime that purposely structures intensive foreign or second language instruction to align with student-centered, communicative language teaching that is skills-focused and content-based.

Focal Skills restructures program design by sequentially focusing attention on the development of one language skill area at a time until its mastery to a chosen threshold level is reached. Assessments in Listening, Reading, and Writing are used to determine whether the threshold level has been attained.

Teaching practices in Focal Skills programs are heavily influenced by the work of Stephen Krashen. There is an emphasis on comprehensible input using authentic materials. Activities that would raise a student's affective filter are generally avoided. The Focal Skills Movie Technique is an example of the kind of teaching used in this approach.

== Background ==
Created in 1988 by Ashley Hastings, Ph.D., the Focal Skills program design took into account research and developments in second language acquisition theory that questioned the efficacy of grammar-based language curricula and the traditional level-based program model developed when structuralist-influenced methodologies dominated the field of intensive second language teaching. In that traditional program model, placement involved determining a student's level and then assigning the student to courses at that level in a number of skill areas (such as Level 4 Reading, Writing, Grammar and Oral Skills). In contrast, the Focal Skills program student is placed into a module of courses that all address the student's weakest skill and focus three fourths of instruction on developing that one skill area. The remaining portion is spent in an elective class selected for that week by the student. The skill modules are sequenced as follows: first the Listening, next Reading, then Writing, and finally, Immersion—where emphasis is on oral skills development and on readying all skills for the specific language environments the student expects to encounter.

The Focal Skills program model was first implemented at the Intensive English as a Second Language Program at the University of Wisconsin–Milwaukee and later adopted, in whole or in part, at other intensive programs, including the English Language Programme at the United Nations. Adaptations of the program model have made it workable not only for relatively large programs, such as the ones at UW–Milwaukee, the University of Dallas, and Palo Alto College (San Antonio), but also for relatively small programs, like those at the Intensive English Institute, part of the University of Maine in Orono, Kilgore College (Texas), and Vincennes University (Indiana).

== Outline ==
Upon entry into a Focal Skills program, the student is given a complete battery of Focal Skills assessments, including Listening, Reading, and Writing tests. These entry scores are used as a baseline for measuring student progress, but the student is immediately placed into the first module in the Focal Skills sequence for which the student has not attained the requisite threshold or pass-out score. If the student does not earn the needed score on the Listening Assessment, the student is placed into the Listening Module for instruction—whether the student has already reached the requisite threshold score in other skill areas or not. After each month of instruction in that module, the student is tested again with an alternate form of the Listening Assessment.

Once the listening skill is mastered to the requisite threshold as evidenced by attainment of the pass-out score, the student's placement moves on to the next skill module in which the student is not currently scoring at or above the threshold level. Skills already developed in the previous modules of the sequence are then maintained and further developed while the skill area of the next module is receiving focused instruction. Thus, a student testing out of the Listening Module and scoring below threshold in Reading at intake testing is given a new form of the Reading Assessment. The results determine whether the student has also attained the threshold score in Reading or will need to spend the next month in Reading Module classes, where—while focusing on reading skills development—the instructional methods will exercise and, so, further develop the student's listening skills as well. Students meeting the threshold on Listening and Reading, but not Writing, are placed into the Writing Module, where they will be exposed to methods that use and further practice their listening and reading skills while focusing on developing their writing skills.

== Movie technique ==
The Focal Skills Movie Technique (FSMT), also referred to as the Narrative/Paraphrase Approach, is a language-teaching technique originally developed for use in Focal Skills programs. The purpose of FSMT is to provide large quantities of high-interest comprehensible input (see Monitor Theory), which has been identified by researchers, primarily Stephen Krashen, as a necessary element for successful language acquisition.

A teacher using FSMT shows a movie to students, describing the scenes as they occur and paraphrasing dialogue when necessary to help the students understand the story. The narrations and paraphrases are meant to be at a level of language that is just a bit beyond the students’ current proficiency (i+1; see Monitor Theory).

The work of the teacher in this process is vital, as the dialogue in the movie is not likely to be intelligible to the students for whom FSMT is intended. The teacher's task is to use the images, actions, and plot of the movie as supports for the students’ comprehension of the language produced by the teacher.
