= Pre-production (disambiguation) =

Pre-production or preproduction may refer to:

- Pre-production, the process of preparing all the elements involved in a film, play, or other performance
- Pre-production car, a vehicle that allows automakers to find problems before a new model goes on sale to the public
- Pre-production period, the silent period of second-language acquisition
