= Comprehension approach =

Language-learning approach

The comprehension approach to language learning emphasizes understanding of language rather than speaking it. This is in contrast to the better-known communicative approach, under which learning is thought to emerge through language production, i.e. a focus on speech and writing.

== Influential linguists ==
The comprehension approach is most strongly associated with the linguists Harris Winitz, Stephen Krashen, Tracy D. Terrell and James J. Asher. The comprehension-based methodology most commonly found in classrooms is Asher's Total Physical Response approach; Krashen and Terrell's Natural Approach has not been widely applied. English as a Second Language Podcast is a more recent application of the comprehension approach grounded in Krashen's theories.

The comprehension approach is based on theories of linguistics, specifically Krashen's theories of second language acquisition, and is also inspired by research on second language acquisition in children, particularly the silent period phenomenon in which many young learners initially tend towards minimal speaking. In contrast, the communicative approach is largely a product of research in language education.

== Learning through understanding ==
Comprehension approach refers to a method of learning a new language through the process of understanding the meaning of words and expressions in the language as opposed to any other form of language learning. Other methods that may be used as part of the progression of language learning include the process of learning the letters, symbols and other representations of the language first before actually understanding the meaning of the words. The difference between the comprehension approach and the other more scientific approach to learning a new language lies in the fact that the comprehension approach is simply another dimension toward learning a new language.

The comprehension approach usually involves a silent period when the learner tries to assimilate the various meanings of the words that make up the target language. How long the silent period lasts depends on the skills of the learner in terms of comprehension ability and general cognitive skills, as someone who is a quick study may be able to quickly grasp the basic concepts of a new language faster than others. During the silent period, the new language learner will try as much as possible to understand what the words mean and how to pronounce them. The disadvantage of this type of approach is that some people who are not very confident might decide to wait until they feel that they have totally grasped the concepts of the language, including the correct pronunciation, before attempting to speak that language. This may be due to a reluctance to mispronounce the words or to misapply the language while attempting to speak it.

== Advantages ==
An advantage of the comprehension approach of language learning is the fact that when the learner eventually understands the meaning and the correct application of the words, the language will sound more effortless when he or she speaks it in contrast to other forms of language learning, which may result in more stilted efforts. Since the comprehension approach requires a deliberate effort to understand the language first, it often leads to situations where the language learner might understand the general gist of the language, but lack the ability to speak it. This phenomenon may be attributed to the fact that the brain is a complex entity that allows for the resources to compartmentalize different cognitive skills, as is clearly evident in the ability to learn the meaning of a language first before speaking it.

Winitz founded the International Linguistics Corporation in 1976 to supply comprehension-based materials known as The Learnables; several positive articles have been published testing these picturebooks with their accompanying audio recordings, mostly with Winitz as co-author.

== See also ==
- Grammar–translation method
