= Growing Participator Approach =

Paradigm for second-language acquisition

The Growing Participator Approach (GPA) is an alternative paradigm for second language acquisition created by Greg Thomson. In GPA, the goal is not language acquisition, but participation in the life of a new community, which is constantly growing over time. Thus, GPA uses the terminology of a 'growing participator' instead of a language learner, and a 'nurturer' instead of a teacher. Theoretically, GPA draws upon Lev Vygotsky's Sociocultural Theory, especially as interpreted by James Wertsch. This includes in particular the mediated nature of human mental life, and the zone of proximal development, relabeled as the growth zone. A second influence is the psycholinguistic study of speech comprehension and production. A third influence is usage-based linguistics. Various areas related to linguistic anthropology (identity theory, politeness theory, discourse analysis, communities of practice, figured worlds, etc.) also play roles In the language of pedagogy, GPA involves an approach, a method, and techniques.

== Approach ==
Thomson suggests three dimensions of language learning (or participation) which are important for GPA.

=== Sociocultural Dimension ===
GPA supports Michael Agar's effort to erase the circle scholars attempted to draw separating language and culture. Essentialization or reification of "culture "are also resisted. One of the GPA slogans is "We don't do language; we do people (and people talk [a lot])". Rather than "cultures" the GPA sees groups of people joined by their shared practices. As those shared practices are mediated by tools and signs that differ greatly from group to group, they are referred to as "languacultural worlds". Thus, instead of viewing "language learning" as a private achievement of individual human brains, the goal is to enter and grow within a "host langucultural world," by appropriating more and more of its practices over time through participation in life with concrete host people. Hence, GPA uses the terminology of "growing participators" rather than "language learners". Growing participation happens most effectively when host people interact with the growing participators within their growth zone (ZPD).

=== Cognitive Dimension ===
Drawing on fields of psycholinguistics and usage-based grammar, and noting that good comprehension of English speech requires a listening vocabulary of over 10,000 words, GPA emphasizes "massive comprehension vocabulary." However, instead of rote memorization, GPA advocates strong initial encounters with new words, followed by natural "strengthening encounters" in new contexts that make them meaningful. The strengthening encounters will occur in line with the frequency of the words (local frequency by discourse, or global frequency). As new words are encountered and understood, their form is at first attached to the growing participator's home-world lexical concepts (fast mapping). Ultimately, the growing participator doesn't know words in a piecemeal way, but comes to understand them in connection with discourses in which they play a role, as the growing participator becomes party more and more to host-world discourses in which those words play a role (with situated meanings). The development of a healthy mental (comprehension) lexicon will require "encountering a massive amount of understandable speech over a long period of time". Thus, GPA emphasizes comprehension and listening as the natural pathway toward speaking ability in the host language. These principles apply not only to words, but to recurring word combinations and patterns of words. As noted, the bigger picture includes the socio-cultural processes that the cognitive processes reflect.

=== Temporal Dimension ===
Where as many language programs emphasize quantity of time, GPA puts an additional emphasis on quality. "Host world time" is divided into "lifestyle growing participation time" (naturalistic immersion) and "Special growth participation time". In general, "Host world time" is time when the GP is interacting with host people using host words, and attempting to follow host behavior. GPA aims for 20 hours/week during which "people interact with me in my growth zone in their languacultural world." As a result, because a beginning growing participator's growth is so limited, early growth requires that a dedicated host person be recruited as a special nurturer.

=== "Language Acquisition" in GPA Terms ===
Based on these three dimensions, GPA's approach can be summarised as follows:

Presuppositions about Language Acquisition in GPA
Communing	1. Early growth in participation requires that host people interact with growing participators in their growth zone for many hours per week.
Communing	2. The "growth zone" (ZPD) is a social concept, and secondarily a mental concept
Communing	3. To participate meaningfully and in one's growth zone is to grow
Communing	4. Emotional dynamics in growing participation are social in origin
Communing	5. The social relationships of growing participators with one another and with nurturers need to be enjoyable
Understanding	6. New growing participators face the challenge of learning to perceive new speech sounds
Understanding	7. Beginners benefit from at least thirty or forty hours of activities with nurturers in which they listen intensively and respond nonverbally
Understanding	8. Early activities with nurturers lead to internalization of linguistic form through awareness-raising activities and Focus on Form.
Understanding	9. When encountering word forms or word patterns, first priority is their function in comprehension.
Understanding	10. From the beginning "grammar acquisition" is the accumulation of meaningful experiences of constructions.
Understanding	11. Remembered experience with words, word forms, word patterns, etc. provides the basis for attempts at spoken production
Understanding	12. Different growing participators have differing capacities for (and needs for) metalinguistic thinking about grammatical form.
Talking	13. Talking means expressing oneself in one's own words, in interaction that allows for scaffolding
Talking	14. In early talking, the growing participator depends a lot on assistance and feedback in interaction
Talking	15. Growing participation is a long journey, by its very nature, never complete.
Evolving	16. Growth is the fruit of meaningful interaction in the growing participator's growth zone, and not "study".
Evolving	17. As the growing participator's level of ability changes, the nature of the special-growth activities with nurturers (and mentors) necessarily changes for growth to continue.

== Method ==
The Six-Phase Program (SPP), created by Thomson, is "an idealised program to guide a growing participator into deep involvement with a community." It involves 1,500 hours of special-growth activities, assisted (initially) by a dedicated native speaker —a nurturer, who is most often not a career teacher. It is "structured in such a way that the activities become increasingly advanced as the user grows, and the activities are "keyed to the sociocultural/human-relationship changes and cognitive changes that the growing participator (GP) undergoes."

=== Overview of the Six-Phase Program ===
	Name	Communication Ability	Hrs	Vocab learnt
1	Connecting	I understand what I hear if I can clearly see what is being talked about (objects, activities, locations, simple situations, etc.).	100	900
2	Emerging	With the use of visual supports (picture stories, stick figures, blocks, etc.), a host person and I begin to create stories together.	150	2,250 (+1500)
3	Knowable	A host person talks to me about things I already know & we discuss them simply (e.g. common stories).	250	3,500 (+1250)
4	Deep Personal Relationships	Several host people take me more deeply into their lives, and in the process we share our stories and lives together.	500	6,000 (+2500)
5	Widening Understanding	I listen a lot to host people talking with other host people. I find frequent gaps in my understanding and fill them in.	500	9,000 (+3500)
6	Ever Participating/Growing	I understand almost all I hear, and it feeds my growth in communication ability.	-	-

=== Techniques ===
GPA and the SPP utilise a wide array of techniques, such as TPR activities (in silence for the first 30-40 hrs), back and forth storytelling, wordless picture books, discussing speech acts with the use of resources such as Lexicarry, input/output flooding, ethnographic interviews, and extensive recording and playback for revision.
