= Language pedagogy =

Methods of teaching languages

Language pedagogy is the discipline concerned with the theories and techniques of teaching language. It has been described as a type of teaching wherein the teacher draws from their own prior knowledge and actual experience in teaching language. The approach is distinguished from research-based methodologies.

There are several methods in language pedagogy but they can be classified into three: structural, functional, and interactive. Each of these encompasses a number of methods that can be utilised in order to teach and learn languages.

== Development ==
The development of language pedagogy came in three stages. In the late 1800s and most of the 1900s, it was usually conceived in terms of method. In 1963, the University of Michigan Linguistics Professor Edward Mason Anthony Jr. formulated a framework to describe them into three levels: approach, method, and technique. It has been expanded by Richards and Rodgers in 1982 to approach, design, and procedure.

== Methodology ==
In the late 1800s and most of the 1900s, language teaching was usually conceived in terms of method. In seeking to improve teaching practices, teachers and researchers would typically try to find out which method was the most effective. However, method is an ambiguous concept in language teaching and has been used in many different ways. According to Bell, this variety in use "offers a challenge for anyone wishing to enter into the analysis or deconstruction of methods".

The methods of teaching language may be characterized into three principal views:

1. The structural view treats language as a system of structurally related elements to code meaning (e.g. grammar).
2. The functional view sees language as a vehicle to express or accomplish certain functions, (e.g. making a request, giving information or asking for information).
3. The interactive view sees language as a vehicle for the creation and maintenance of social relations, focusing on patterns of moves, acts, negotiation and interaction found in conversational exchanges. This view has been fairly dominant since the 1980s.

Additionally, there is an abundance of proprietary methods tied to particular companies or schools that are not as widely used in mainstream teaching. The most notable being specific computer courses which use programming and speech recognition to give feedback to participants.

== Approach, method and technique ==
In 1963, the University of Michigan Linguistics Professor Edward Mason Anthony Jr. formulated a framework to describe various language teaching methods, which consisted of three levels: approach, method, and technique. According to Anthony, "The arrangement is hierarchical. The organizational key is that techniques carry out a method which is consistent with an approach." His concept of approach was of a set of principles or ideas about the nature of language learning which would be consistent over time; "an approach is axiomatic". His method was more procedural; "an overall plan for the orderly presentation of language material, no part of which contradicts, and all of which is based upon, the selected approach." Finally, his concept of technique referred to the actual implementation in the language classroom; "a particular trick, stratagem, or contrivance used to accomplish an immediate objective." He saw techniques as being consistent with a given method and by extension, with a given approach.

A method is a plan for presenting the language material to be learned and should be based upon a selected approach. In order for an approach to be translated into a method, an instructional system must be designed considering the objectives of the teaching/learning, how the content is to be selected and organized, the types of tasks to be performed, the roles of students, and the roles of teachers. A technique is a very specific, concrete stratagem or trick designed to accomplish an immediate objective. Such are derived from the controlling method, and less directly, with the approach.

Anthony's framework was welcomed by the language teaching community when it was introduced, and it was seen as a useful way of classifying different teaching practices. However, it did not clearly define the difference between approach, method, and technique, and Kumaravadivelu reports that due to this ambiguity there was "widespread dissatisfaction" with it. Anthony himself recognized the limitations of his framework, and was open to the idea of improvements being made to it.

== Approach, design and procedure ==
Richards and Rodgers' 1982 approach expanded on Anthony's three-level framework; however, instead of approach, method, and technique, they chose the terms approach, design, and procedure. Their concept of approach was similar to Anthony's, but their design and procedure were of broader scope than Anthony's method and technique. Their design referred to all major practical implications in the classroom, such as syllabus design, types of activities to be used in the classroom, and student and teacher roles; procedure referred to different behaviors, practices, and techniques observed in the classroom. These new terms were intended to address limitations in Anthony's framework, and also gave them specific criteria by which they could evaluate different "methods". This evaluation process was a key way that their formulation differed from Anthony's, as Anthony's framework was intended as purely descriptive.

Despite Richards and Rodgers' efforts to clearly define approach, design, and procedure, their framework has been criticized by Kumaravadivelu for having "an element of artificiality in its conception and an element of subjectivity in its operation". Kumaravadivelu also points to similar objections raised by Pennyworth and by the Routledge Encyclopedia of Language Teaching and Learning. Brown also questions the suitability of Richards and Rodgers' term design; he points out that in English teaching design is usually used to refer specifically to curriculum design, rather than the broad definition Richards and Rodgers used. Most current teacher training manuals favor the terms approach, method, and technique.

== Structural methods ==
The structural approach treats language as "a system of structurally related elements for the coding of meaning" and emphasizes competencies in phonological units, grammatical and lexical items. It examines language products such as sounds, morphemes, words, sentences, and vocabulary, among others.

=== Grammar–translation method ===
The grammar translation method instructs students in grammar, and provides vocabulary with direct translations to memorize. It was the predominant method in Europe from the 1840s to the 1940s. Most instructors now acknowledge that this method is ineffective by itself. It is now most commonly used in the traditional instruction of the classical languages, however it remains the most commonly practiced method of English teaching in Japan.

At school, the teaching of grammar consists of a process of training in the rules of a language which must make it possible for all the students to correctly express their opinion, to understand the remarks which are addressed to them and to analyze the texts which they read. The objective is that by the time they leave college, the pupil controls the tools of the language which are the vocabulary, grammar and the orthography, to be able to read, understand and write texts in various contexts. The teaching of grammar examines texts, and develops awareness that language constitutes a system which can be analyzed.

This knowledge is acquired gradually, by traversing the facts of language and the syntactic mechanisms, going from simplest to the most complex. The exercises according to the program of the course must untiringly be practiced to allow the assimilation of the rules stated in the course. That supposes that the teacher corrects the exercises. The pupil can follow his progress in practicing the language by comparing his results. Thus can he adapt the grammatical rules and control little by little the internal logic of the syntactic system. The grammatical analysis of sentences constitutes the objective of the teaching of grammar at the school. Its practice makes it possible to recognize a text as a coherent whole and conditions the training of a foreign language. Grammatical terminology serves this objective. Grammar makes it possible for each pupil to understand how his mother tongue functions, in order to give him the capacity to communicate his thought.

=== Audio-lingual method ===
The audio-lingual method – also known as Aural-Oral Method – was developed in the United States around World War II. The government realized that they needed more people who could conduct conversations fluently in a variety of languages, work as interpreters, code-room assistants, and translators. However, since foreign language instruction in that country was heavily focused on reading instruction, no textbooks, other materials or courses existed at the time, so new methods and materials had to be devised. Soldiers needed to converse with people in lands they were stationed so they had to learn new languages quickly. The U.S. Army Specialized Training Program created intensive programs based on the techniques Leonard Bloomfield and other linguists devised for Native American languages, where students interacted intensively with native speakers and a linguist in guided conversations designed to decode its basic grammar and learn the vocabulary. This "informant method" had great success with its small class sizes and motivated learners.

The U.S. Army Specialized Training Program only lasted a few years, but it gained a lot of attention from the popular press and the academic community. Charles C. Fries set up the first English Language Institute at the University of Michigan, to train English as a second language for foreign language teachers. Similar programs were created later at Georgetown University, University of Texas among others based on the methods and techniques used by the military. The developing method had much in common with the British oral approach although the two developed independently. The main difference was the developing audio-lingual methods allegiance to structural linguistics, focusing on grammar and contrastive analysis to find differences between the student's native language and the target language in order to prepare specific materials to address potential problems. These materials strongly emphasized drill as a way to avoid or eliminate these problems.

This first version of the method was originally called the oral method, the aural-oral method or the structural approach. The audio-lingual method truly began to take shape near the end of the 1950s, this time due government pressure resulting from the space race. Courses and techniques were redesigned to add insights from behaviorist psychology to the structural linguistics and constructive analysis already being used. Under this method, students listen to or view recordings of language models acting in situations. Students practice with a variety of drills, and the instructor emphasizes the use of the target language at all times. The idea is that by reinforcing 'correct' behaviors, students will make them into habits.

The typical structure of a chapter employing the Audio-Lingual-Method (ALM—and there was even a text book entitled ALM [1963]) was usually standardized as follows: 1. First item was a dialog in the foreign language (FL) to be memorized by the student. The teacher would go over it the day before. 2. There were then questions in the FL about the dialog to be answered by the student(s) in the target language. 3. Often a brief introduction to the grammar of the chapter was next, including the verb(s) and conjugations. 4. The mainstay of the chapter was "pattern practice," which were drills expecting "automatic" responses from the student(s) as a noun, verb conjugation, or agreeing adjective was to be inserted in the blank in the text (or during the teacher's pause). The teacher could have the student use the book or not use it, relative to how homework was assigned. Depending on time, the class could respond as a chorus, or the teacher could pick individuals to respond. Julian Dakin, in 'The Language Laboratory and Language Learning' (Longman 1973), coined the phrase 'meaningless drills' to describe this kind of pattern practice, which others have also described as "mimicry-memorization." 5. There was a vocabulary list, sometimes with translations to the mother tongue. 6. The chapter usually ended with a short reading exercise.

Due to weaknesses in performance, and more importantly because of Noam Chomsky's theoretical attack on language learning as a set of habits, audio-lingual methods are rarely the primary method of instruction today. However, elements of the method still survive in many textbooks.

== Functional methods ==
=== The oral approach and situational language teaching ===
The oral approach was developed from the 1930s to the 1960s by British applied linguists such as Harold Palmer and A.S. Hornsby. They were familiar with the direct method as well as the work of 19th-century applied linguists such as Otto Jespersen and Daniel Jones but attempted to formally develop a more scientifically founded approach to teaching English than was evidenced by the direct method.

A number of large-scale investigations about language learning and the increased emphasis on reading skills in the 1920s led to the notion of "vocabulary control". It was discovered that languages have a core basic vocabulary of about 2,000 words that occur frequently in written texts, and it was assumed that mastery of these would greatly aid reading comprehension. Parallel to this was the notion of "grammar control", emphasizing the sentence patterns most commonly found in spoken conversation. Such patterns were incorporated into dictionaries and handbooks for students. The principal difference between the oral approach and the direct method was that methods devised under this approach would have theoretical principles guiding the selection of content, gradation of difficulty of exercises and the presentation of such material and exercises. The main proposed benefit was that such theoretically based organization of content would result in a less-confusing sequence of learning events with better contextualization of the vocabulary and grammatical patterns presented. Last but not least, all language points were to be presented in "situations". Emphasis on this point led to the approach's second name. Proponents claim that this approach leads to students' acquiring good habits to be repeated in their corresponding situations. These teaching methods stress PPP: presentation (introduction of new material in context), practice (a controlled practice phase) and production (activities designed for less-controlled practice).

Although this approach is all but unknown among language teachers today, elements of it have had long-lasting effects on language teaching, being the basis of many widely used English as a Second/Foreign Language textbooks as late as the 1980s and elements of it still appear in current texts. Many of the structural elements of this approach were called into question in the 1960s, causing modifications of this method that led to communicative language teaching. However, its emphasis on oral practice, grammar and sentence patterns still finds widespread support among language teachers and remains popular in countries where foreign language syllabuses are still heavily based on grammar.

=== Directed practice ===
Directed practice has students repeat phrases. This method is used by U.S. diplomatic courses. It can quickly provide a phrasebook-type knowledge of the language. Within these limits, the student's usage is accurate and precise. However the student's choice of what to say is not flexible.

== Interactive methods ==
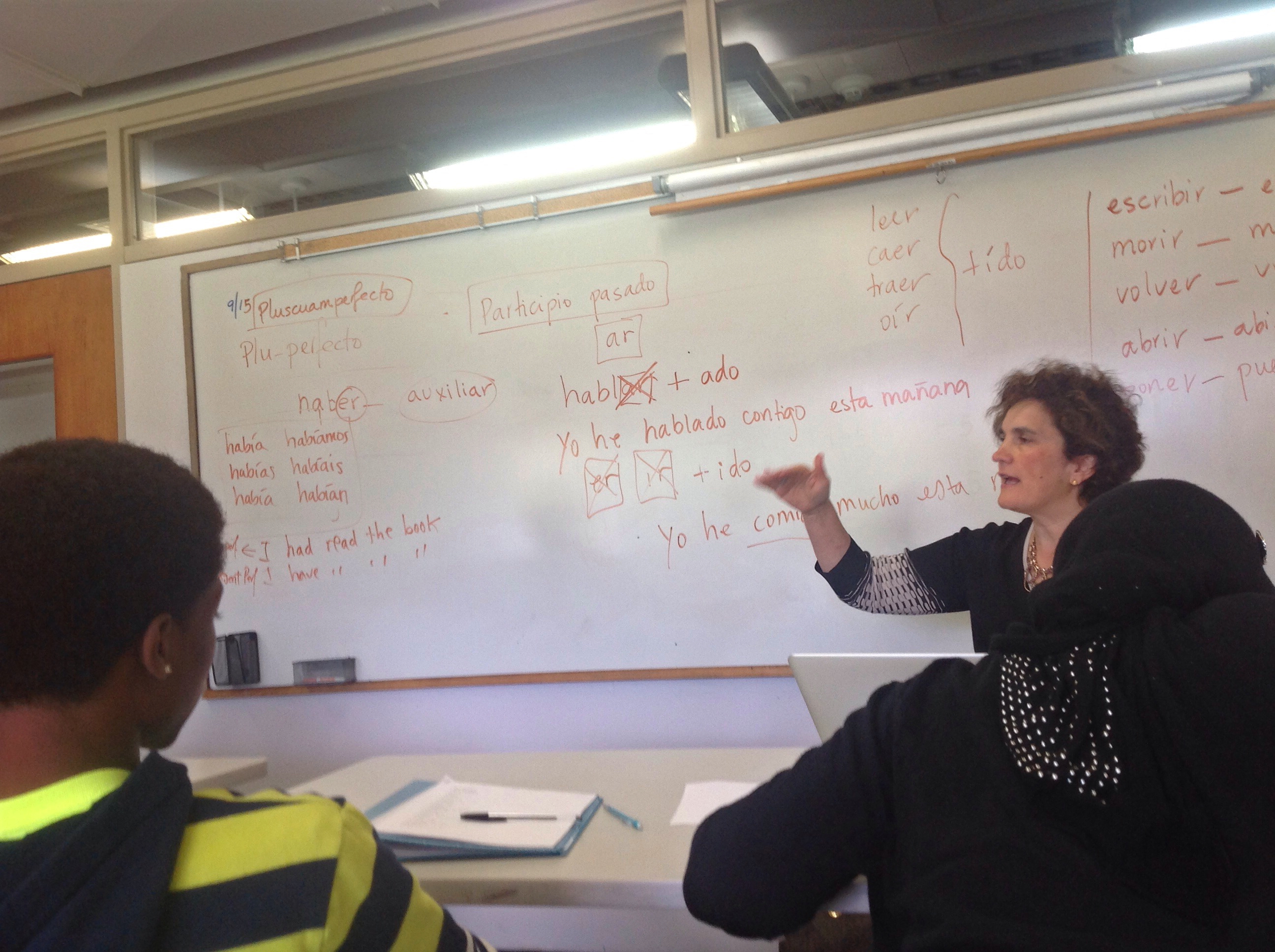
High School Spanish taught as a second language to a class of native English speakers at an American private school in Massachusetts.

=== Direct method ===
The direct method, sometimes also called natural method, is a method that refrains from using the learners' native language and just uses the target language. It was established in Germany and France around 1900 and is best represented by the methods devised by Berlitz and de Sauzé, although neither claims originality and it has been re-invented under other names. The direct method operates on the idea that second language learning must be an imitation of first language learning, as this is the natural way humans learn any language: a child never relies on another language to learn its first language, and thus the mother tongue is not necessary to learn a foreign language. This method places great stress on correct pronunciation and the target language from outset. It advocates teaching of oral skills at the expense of every traditional aim of language teaching. Such methods rely on directly representing an experience into a linguistic construct rather than relying on abstractions like mimicry, translation and memorizing grammar rules and vocabulary.

According to this method, printed language and text must be kept away from second language learners for as long as possible, just as a first language learner does not use printed words until he has good grasp of speech. Learning of writing and spelling should be delayed until after the printed word has been introduced, and grammar and translation should also be avoided because this would involve the application of the learner's first language. All above items must be avoided because they hinder the acquisition of a good oral proficiency.

The method relies on a step-by-step progression based on question-and-answer sessions which begin with naming common objects such as doors, pencils, floors, etc. It provides a motivating start as the learner begins using a foreign language almost immediately. Lessons progress to verb forms and other grammatical structures with the goal of learning about thirty new words per lesson.

=== The series method ===
In the 19th century, François Gouin went to Hamburg to learn German. Based on his experience as a Latin teacher, he thought the best way to do this would be to memorize a German grammar book and a table of its 248 irregular verbs. However, when he went to the academy to test his new language skills, he was disappointed to find out that he could not understand anything. Trying again, he similarly memorized the 800 root words of the language as well as re-memorizing the grammar and verb forms. However, the results were the same. During this time, he had isolated himself from people around him, so he tried to learn by listening, imitating and conversing with the Germans around him, but found that his carefully constructed sentences often caused native German speakers to laugh. Again, he tried a more classical approach, translation, and even memorizing the entire dictionary but had no better luck.

His three-year-old nephew who has learned to speak French inspired him. Gouin noticed the boy was curious about everything in the world and enjoyed sharing his experience to whoever would listen or himself. Gouin decided that language learning was a matter of transforming perceptions into conceptions, using language to represent what one experiences. Language is not an arbitrary set of conventions but a way of thinking and representing the world to oneself. It is not a conditioning process, but one in which the learner actively organizes his perceptions into linguistics concepts.

The series method is a variety of the direct method in that experiences are directly connected to the target language. There are three reasons that Gouin preceded psycholinguistic theory of the 20th century. Firstly, in Gouin's opinion, transferring the experience into words will make language easier to understand. Secondly, Gouin noticed that children organize concepts in succession of time, relating a sequence of concepts in the same order. Gouin found that if the series of sentences are shuffled, their memorization becomes nearly impossible. He also found that people will memorize events in a logical sequence, even if they are not presented in that order. He discovered a second insight into memory called "incubation". Linguistic concepts take time to settle in the memory. The learner must use the new concepts frequently after presentation, either by thinking or by speaking, in order to master them. His last observation was that language was learned in sentences with the verb as the most crucial component. Gouin would write a series in two columns: one with the complete sentences and the other with only the verb. With only the verb elements visible, he would have students recite the sequence of actions in full sentences of no more than twenty-five sentences. Another exercise involved having the teacher solicit a sequence of sentences by basically ask him/her what s/he would do next. While Gouin believed that language was rule-governed, he did not believe it should be explicitly taught.

His course was organized on elements of human society and the natural world. He estimated that a language could be learned with 800 to 900 hours of instruction over a series of 4000 exercises and no homework. The idea was that each of the exercises would force the student to think about the vocabulary in terms of its relationship with the natural world. While there is evidence that the method can work extremely well, it has some serious flaws. One of which is the teaching of subjective language, where the students must make judgments about what is experienced in the world (e.g., "bad" and "good") as such do not relate easily to one single common experience. However, the real weakness is that the method is entirely based on one experience of a three-year-old. Gouin did not observe the child's earlier language development such as naming (where only nouns are learned) or the role that stories have in human language development. What distinguishes the series method from the direct method is that vocabulary must be learned by translation from the native language, at least in the beginning.

=== Communicative language teaching ===
Communicative language teaching (CLT), also known as the Communicative Approach, emphasizes interaction as both the means and the ultimate goal of learning a language. Despite a number of criticisms it continues to be popular, particularly in Europe, where constructivist views on language learning and education in general dominate academic discourse. 'Communicative Language Teaching' is not so much a method on its own as it is an approach.

In recent years, task-based language learning (TBLL), also known as task-based language teaching (TBLT) or task-based instruction (TBI), has grown steadily in popularity. TBLL is a further refinement of the CLT approach, emphasizing the successful completion of tasks as both the organizing feature and the basis for assessment of language instruction. Dogme language teaching shares a philosophy with TBL, although differs in approach. Dogme is a communicative approach and encourages teaching without published textbooks and instead focusing on conversational communication among the learners and the teacher.

=== Language immersion ===
Language immersion in school contexts delivers academic content through the medium of a foreign language, providing support for L2 learning and first language maintenance. There are three main types of immersion education programs in the United States: foreign language immersion, dual immersion, and indigenous immersion.

Foreign language immersion programs in the U.S. are designed for students whose home language is English. In the early immersion model, for all or part of the school day elementary school children receive their content (academic) instruction through the medium of another language: Spanish, French, German, Chinese, Japanese, etc. In early total immersion models, children receive all the regular kindergarten and first grade content through the medium of the immersion language; English reading is introduced later, often in the second grade. Most content (math, science, social studies, art, music) continues to be taught through the immersion language. In early partial immersion models, part of the school day (usually 50%) delivers content through the immersion language, and part delivers it through English. French-language immersion programs are common in Canada in the provincial school systems, as part of the drive towards bilingualism and are increasing in number in the United States in public school systems (Curtain & Dahlbert, 2004). Branaman & Rhodes (1998) report that between 1987 and 1997 the percentage of elementary programs offering foreign language education in the U.S. through immersion grew from 2% to 8%, and Curtain & Dahlberg (2004) report 278 foreign language immersion programs in 29 states. Research by Swain and others (Genesee 1987) demonstrate much higher levels of proficiency achieved by children in foreign language immersion programs than in traditional foreign language education elementary school models.

Dual immersion programs in the U.S. are designed for students whose home language is English as well as for students whose home language is the immersion language (usually Spanish). The goal is bilingual students with mastery of both English and the immersion language. As in partial foreign language immersion, academic content is delivered through the medium of the immersion language for part of the school day, and through English the rest of the school day.

Indigenous immersion programs in the U.S. are designed for American Indian communities desiring to maintain the use of the native language by delivering elementary school content through the medium of that language. Hawaiian Immersion programs are the largest and most successful in this category.

=== Silent Way ===
The Silent Way is a discovery learning approach, invented by Caleb Gattegno in the late 1950s. The teacher is largely silent, giving more space for the students to explore the language. Students are responsible for their own learning and are encouraged to express themselves; beginners talk about what they see, more advanced students talk about their lives and what they think. The role of the teacher is not to model the language but to correct mistakes by giving sensitive feedback. With respect to teaching pronunciation, the Silent Way is a good example of the Articulatory Approach.

=== Community language learning ===
The community language learning (CLL) is a method proposed by Charles A. Curran during the 1970s. It is based on the counseling approach in which the teacher is seen as a counselor. It emphasizes the sense of community in the learning group, encourages interaction as a vital aspect of learning, and it considers as a priority the students' feelings and the recognition of struggles in language acquisition. There is no syllabus or textbook to follow, and it is the students themselves who determine the content of the lesson. Notably, it incorporates translation and recording techniques.

=== Suggestopedia ===
Suggestopedia was a method that experienced popularity especially in past years, with both staunch supporters and very strong critics, some claiming it is based on pseudoscience.

=== Natural approach ===
The natural approach is a language teaching method developed by Stephen Krashen and Tracy D. Terrell. They emphasise the learner receiving large amounts of comprehensible input. The Natural Approach can be categorized as part of the comprehension approach to language teaching.

=== Total physical response ===
In total physical response (TPR), the instructor gives the students commands in the target language and the students act those commands out using whole-body responses. This can be categorized as part of the comprehension approach to language teaching.

=== Teaching Proficiency through Reading and Storytelling ===
Teaching Proficiency through Reading and Storytelling (TPR Storytelling or TPRS) was developed by Blaine Ray, a language teacher in California, in the 1990s. At first it was an offshoot of Total Physical Response that also included storytelling, but it has evolved into a method in its own right and has gained a large following among teachers, particularly in the United States. TPR Storytelling can be categorized as part of the comprehension approach to language teaching.

=== Dogme language teaching ===
Dogme language teaching is considered to be both a methodology and a movement. Dogme is a communicative approach to language teaching and encourages teaching without published textbooks and instead focusing on conversational communication among the learners and the teacher. It has its roots in an article by the language education author, Scott Thornbury. The Dogme approach is also referred to as “Dogme ELT”, which reflects its origins in the ELT (English language teaching) sector. Although Dogme language teaching gained its name from an analogy with the Dogme 95 film movement (initiated by Lars von Trier), the connection is not considered close.

=== Growing Participator Approach ===
The Growing Participator Approach (GPA) is an alternative way of thinking about second language acquisition, developed by Greg Thomson. GPA as an approach is usually implemented using Thomson's Six Phase Program (SPP) method, which involves 1,500 hours of special growth participation activities, supported by a local native language speaker, and targeted towards the learner's growth zone (zone of proximal development). The Six Phase Program utilises a number of techniques, such as TPR, to quickly grow the leaners comprehension ability without the use of English. The goal is to help learners continually 'grow' in their ability to meaningful 'participate' in the host culture. GPA influences include Vygotsky, as well as "the psycholinguistics of comprehension and production, usage-based approaches to language, linguistic anthropology and discourse analysis."

== Proprietary methods ==
Some methods are tied to a particular company or school and are not used in mainstream teaching. Besides those mentioned below, there are dozens of competitors, each slightly different. Notable are the computer courses which use speech recognition to give feedback on pronunciation.

=== Pimsleur method ===
Pimsleur language learning system is based on the research of and model programs developed by American language teacher Paul Pimsleur. It involves recorded 30-minute lessons to be done daily, with each lesson typically featuring a dialog, revision, and new material. Students are asked to translate phrases into the target language, and occasionally to respond in the target language to lines spoken in the target language. The instruction starts in the student's language but gradually changes to the target language. Several all-audio programs now exist to teach various languages using the Pimsleur Method. The syllabus is the same in all languages.

=== Michel Thomas method ===
Michel Thomas Method is an audio-based teaching system developed by Michel Thomas, a language teacher in the US. It was originally done in person, although since his death it is done via recorded lessons. The instruction is done entirely in the student's own language, although the student's responses are always expected to be in the target language. The method focuses on constructing long sentences with correct grammar and building student confidence. There is no listening practice, and there is no reading or writing. The syllabus is ordered around the easiest and most useful features of the language, and as such is different for each language.

== Other ==
Appropedia is increasingly being used to as a method to enable service learning in language education.

Computer assisted language learning (CALL) is a method that includes a combination of methods and techniques using the resources available on the internet, as well as a variety of language learning software.

There is a lot of language learning software using the multimedia capabilities of computers.

=== Learning by teaching (LdL) ===
Learning by teaching is a widespread method in Germany, developed by Jean-Pol Martin. The students take the teacher's role and teach their peers.

== See also ==
- Language education

== Notes ==
- Anthony, E. M. (1963). "Approach, Method, and Technique". ELT Journal. XVII (2): 63–67. doi:10.1093/elt/XVII.2.63.
- Bell, David (2003). "Method and Postmethod: Are They Really So Incompatible?" (PDF). TESOL Quarterly. 37 (2): 315–328. doi:10.2307/3588507. JSTOR 3588507.
- Brown, H. (2001). Teaching by Principles: An Interactive Approach to Language Pedagogy (2nd ed.). White Plains, NY: Longman. ISBN 978-0-13-028283-5.
- Hall, Graham (2011). Exploring English Language Teaching: Language in Action. London, New York: Routledge. ISBN 978-0-415-58415-9.
- Johnson, Keith; Johnson, Helen, eds. (1999). "Approach". Encyclopedic Dictionary of Applied Linguistics: A Handbook for Language Teaching. Oxford: Blackwell Publishers. ISBN 978-0-631-22767-0.
- Kumaravadivelu, B. (2006). Understanding Language Teaching. Hillsdale: Lawrence Erlbaum. ISBN 978-0-8058-5176-2.
- Richards, Jack; Rodgers, Theodore (2001). Approaches and Methods in Language Teaching. Cambridge: Cambridge University Press. ISBN 978-0-521-00843-3.
- Kho, Mu-Jeong (2016). How to Implant a Semiotic and Mathematical DNA into Learning English. Seoul: Booklab Publishing Co. ISBN 979-11-87300-04-5.
