= Graded reader =

Book written with a specific level of complexity and vocabulary in mind

A graded reader is an "easy reading" book that supports the extensive reading approach to teaching languages. While many graded readers are written for native speaker children, more often they are targeted at young adults and above, since children's books are already widely available and deal with topics not relevant to more mature language learners.

Graded readers can be adapted from literary classics, films, biographies, travel books, etc., or they can be original works written at a less demanding language level. Although they employ simplified language, graded readers do not necessarily lack narrative depth or avoid complex themes; often, they cover the same range of "serious" themes as books written for native speaker audiences.

Graded readers are written with specific levels of grammatical complexity in mind and with vocabulary that is limited by frequency headword counts. For example, Level 1 in a series might be restricted to 500 headwords, Level 2 to 600 headwords, and Level 3 to 700 headwords.

Graded readers are not to be confused with basal readers, such as Dick and Jane, which tend to target specific language features, and therefore are more like textbooks in nature.
