= Extensive reading =

Reading longer, easier texts for extended periods of time

Extensive reading (ER) is the process of reading longer, easier texts for an extended period of time without a breakdown of comprehension, feeling overwhelmed, or the need to take breaks. It stands in contrast to intensive or academic reading, which is focused on a close reading of dense, shorter texts, typically not read for pleasure. Though used as a teaching strategy to promote second-language development, ER also applies to free voluntary reading and recreational reading both in and out of the classroom. ER is based on the assumption that we learn to read by reading.

Implementation of ER is often referred to as sustained silent reading (SSR) or free voluntary reading; and is used in both the first- (L1) and second-language (L2) classroom to promote reading fluency and comprehension. In addition to fluency and comprehension, ER has other numerous benefits for both first- and second-language learners, such as greater grammar and vocabulary knowledge, increase in background knowledge, and greater language confidence and motivation.

ER pamphlet created by the Extensive Reading Foundation

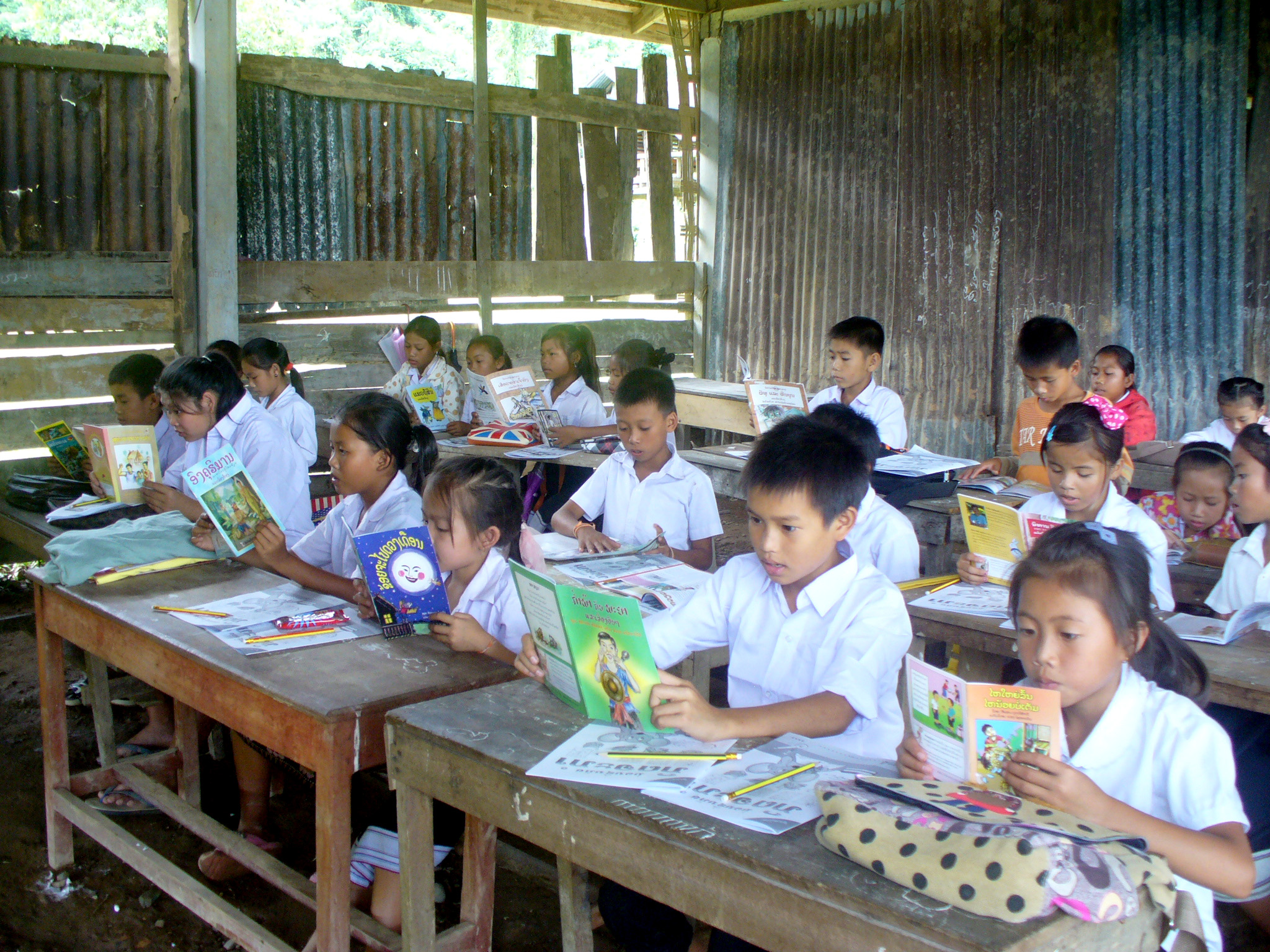
About half of all children in rural Laos speak a minority ethnic language at home, and have difficulty in school, which is taught only in the Lao language. This primary school in Laos began a daily reading period in September 2013, in which children select a book to read simply for enjoyment. Big Brother Mouse, a literacy project that sponsored the program, began conducting a study in 2013 to measure reading and vocabulary improvements in schools that had this program.

== Tenets ==
The basic premise of ER is that learners read as much as possible from materials of their own choosing. Richard Day, chairman and co-founder of The Extensive Reading Foundation, has outlined eight additional tenets of ER. He explains that the first two principles lay the foundation for ER since they address the types of material to be read. The first two tenets state that the reading material should be easy and varied in topic and style. The main reason being that learners should be engaged and motivated by the reading material. Texts that are too challenging or uninteresting will not be read and do not support the third and fourth principles that states reading speed is faster rather than slower and the main purpose of reading is pleasure. Tenet five states that the act of reading is individual and silent, though not all ER programs follow this with many including read-alouds and group readings. He explains that since reading is its own reward, as stated in principle number six, there need not be quizzes, tests, or comprehension question afterwards, though there can and should be some form of follow-up activity. Finally, with the last two principles he directs his attention towards the teacher. In tenet seven he states that the teacher is a role model of a who and what a reader is. In tenet eight he says that the teacher should guide the students by explaining the purpose of ER, since it differs so much from traditional classroom reading.

Graded readers are often used to achieve this. For foreign-language learners, some researchers have found that the use of glosses for "difficult" words is advantageous to vocabulary acquisition but at least one study finds it has no effect. A number of studies report significant incidental vocabulary gain in extensive reading in a foreign language. Advocates claim it can enhance skill in speaking as well as in reading.

Day and Bamford gave a number of traits common or basic to the extensive reading approach. Students read as much as possible. Reading materials are well within the reader's grammatical and vocabulary competence. The material should be varied in subject matter and character.

Students choose their own reading material and are not compelled to finish uninteresting materials. Reading material is normally for pleasure, information, or general understanding; reading is its own reward with few or no follow-up exercises after reading; reading is individual and silent. Reading speed is usually faster when students read materials they can easily understand.

Nation (2005) suggests that learning from extensive reading should meet the following conditions: focusing on the meaning of the English text, understanding the type of learning that can occur through such reading, having interesting and engaging books, getting learners to do large quantities of reading at an appropriate level, and making sure that learning from reading is supported by other kinds of learning. In order to meet the conditions needed for learning from extensive reading at the students’ proficiency levels, it is essential to make use of simplified texts.

The teacher is a role model who also orients the students to the goals of the program, explains the idea and methodology, keeps records of what has been read, and guides students in material selection and maximizing the effect of the program.

Some recent practitioners have not followed all of these traits, or have added to them, for example, requiring regular follow-up exercises such as story summaries or discussions and the use of audio materials in tandem with the readings.

== Graded reader series ==
A graded reader series is a series of books that increase in difficulty from shorter texts using more common words in the first volumes, to longer texts with less common vocabulary in later volumes. Cobb cites Oxford's Bookworm series, which includes the 2,500 most frequent words, The Longman Bridge Series (1945), with a systematic grading up to 8,000 words, now out of print, and the Penguin/Longman Active Reading series with its 3,000 word-family target.

Many series of graded readers exist in English, and series exist also in French, German, Italian, and Spanish. As of 2008, readers are notably absent or scarce in Russian, Arabic, Japanese, and Mandarin Chinese, though since 2006, an extensive reader series is available in Japanese. English readers have primarily been produced by British publishers, rather than American or other Anglophone nations. As of 1997, only one small series (15 volumes) was published in the United States, and a few in Europe outside the UK, with the majority in the UK.

English graded readers (grading criteria)
| Publisher | Series name | Grading criteria |
| Black Cat CIDEB (Italy) | Black Cat Graded Readers | CEFR |
| Cambridge University Press (UK) | Cambridge English Readers | CEFR |
| Easy Reader Egmont (Denmark) | Easy Readers | CEFR / Headwords |
| ELI Publishing (Italy) | ELI Graded Readers | CEFR / Keywords |
| I Talk You Talk Press (Japan) | English Graded Readers | CEFR / Word Count |
| Penguin Book Limited (UK) | Ladybird Readers | Age / Lexile / Key Stage / CEFR |
| Macmillan Education Limited (UK) | Macmillan Readers | Headwords |
| Matatabi Press (UK-Japan) | Matatabi Graded Readers | Readability (Flesch–Kincaid) / TOEIC / Grade Level / Headwords / Word Count |
| Oxford University Press (UK) | Oxford Graded Readers | CEFR / IELTS / Eiken / Headwords |
| Pearson plc (UK) | Pearson English Readers | CEFR / IELTS / Eiken / TOEIC / GSE / Headwords |
| Penguin Book Limited (UK) | Penguin Readers | Age / Lexile / CEFR / Headwords / Word Count |
| Scholastic Corporation (US) | Scholastic Readers | CEFR / Headwords / Word Count |
| Wayzgoose Press (Australia) | Wayzgoose Readers | CEFR |

== Translation of modern literature ==
For advocates of extensive reading, lack of reading selection is an acute issue in classical languages such as Latin – the main readings available being quite difficult and perceived as dry. To increase the available literature and make more light selection available, modern literature (particularly children's literature, comics, and genre fiction) may be translated into classical languages – see list of Latin translations of modern literature for examples in Latin. As F. W. Newman writes in his introduction to a Latin translation of Robinson Crusoe:

"[N]o accuracy of reading small portions of Latin will ever be so effective as extensive reading; and to make extensive reading possible to the many, the style ought to be very easy and the matter attractive."

== Threshold ==
Laufer suggests that 3,000 word families or 5,000 lexical items are a threshold beyond which learners will be able to read more efficiently. Coady & Nation (1998) suggest 98% of lexical coverage and 5,000 word families or 8,000 items for a pleasurable reading experience. After this threshold, the learner leaves the beginner paradox, and enters a virtuous circle. Then, extensive reading becomes more efficient.

== Limits ==
Cobb (2007), McQuillan & Krashen (2008), and Cobb (2008) offer contrasting perspectives. All agree on the need of lexical input, but Cobb (2007; 2008) supported by Parry denounces the sufficiency of extensive reading, the current lexical expansion pedagogy, especially for confirmed learners. According to Cobb (2007), Krashen's input hypothesis states that extensive reading generates a continuous hidden learning (lexical input), eventually "doing the entire job" of vocabulary acquisition. This hypothesis is without empirical evidence, neither on the extent (% of global vocabulary acquisition), nor on the sufficiency of extensive reading for lexicon learning.

Cobb (2007) thus proposed a computer-based study to quantitatively assess the efficiency of extensive reading. Cobb estimated the reading quantity of common learners within the second language (~175,000 words over two years), then randomly took ten words in each of the first thousand most frequent words, the second thousand, and the third thousand, to see how many times those words would appear. Those results should be higher than six to ten encounters, the number needed for stable initial word learning to occur. Cobb (2007) summarizes as follows: "[the quantitative study] shows the extreme unlikelihood of developing an adequate L2 reading lexicon [above 2,000 words families] through reading alone, even in highly favorable circumstances" since "for the vast majority of L2 learners, free or wide reading alone is not a sufficient source of vocabulary knowledge for reading". Thereafter, Cobb restated the need for lexical input, and stated the possibility of increasing it using computer technology.

McQuillan & Krashen (2008) answer that learners may read far more than 175,000 words but rather +1,000,000 words in two years, but Cobb counters that view as being based on excessively successful cases of reading oversimplified texts. Experiments cited by McQuillan and Krashen use easy and fast to read texts, but not material suitable for discovering new vocabulary; unsimplified texts are far harder and slower to read.

== Advocacy and support organizations ==
The Extensive Reading Foundation is a not-for-profit, charitable organization whose purpose is to support and promote extensive reading. One of its initiatives is the annual Language Learner Literature Award for the best new works in English. Another is maintaining a bibliography of research on extensive reading. The Foundation is also interested in helping educational institutions set up extensive reading programs through grants that fund the purchase of books and other reading material.

The Extensive Reading Special Interest Group (ER SIG) of the Japan Association for Language Teaching is a not-for-profit organization which exists to help promote Extensive Reading in Japan. Via a website, the publications Extensive Reading in Japan and Journal of Extensive Reading, presentations throughout Japan, and other activities, the ER SIG aims to help teachers set up and make the most of their ER programs and ER research projects.

== Extensive listening ==
Similar to extensive reading is extensive listening, which is the analogous approach to listening. One issue is that listening speed is generally slower than reading speed, so simpler texts are recommended – one may be able to read a text extensively, but not be able to listen to it extensively.

== See also ==
- Word lists by frequency
- Literacy
- Second language learning
- Vocabulary acquisition
