= Grammar–translation method =

Method of teaching foreign languages

The grammar–translation method is a method of teaching foreign languages derived from the classical (sometimes called traditional) method of teaching Ancient Greek and Latin. In grammar–translation classes, students learn grammatical rules and then apply those rules by translating sentences between the target language and the native language. Advanced students may be required to translate whole texts word-for-word. The method has two main goals: to enable students to read and translate literature written in the source language, and to further students' general intellectual development. It originated from the practice of teaching Latin; in the early 16th century, students learned Latin for communication, but after the language died out it was studied purely as an academic discipline. When teachers started teaching other foreign languages in the 19th century, they used the same translation-based approach as had been used for teaching Latin. The method has been criticized for its shortcomings.

== Criticism of term ==
The overall concept of grammar–translation has been criticized since few verifiable sources support the existence of such a method until the 19th century.

== History and philosophy ==
The grammar–translation method originated from the practice of teaching Latin. In the early 16th century, Latin was the most widely studied foreign language because of its prominence in government, academia and business. However, the use of Latin then dwindled and was gradually replaced by various vernaculars on the national and regional level and with French and later English on the international level. After the decline of Latin, the purpose of learning it in schools changed. Previously, students had learned Latin for the purpose of communication and not just reading, but it came to be learned as a purely academic subject.

Throughout Europe in the 18th and the 19th centuries, the education system was formed primarily around a concept called faculty psychology. The theory dictated that the body and mind were separate and the mind consisted of three parts: the will, emotion and intellect. It was believed that the intellect could eventually be sharpened enough to control the will and emotions by learning Greek and Roman classical literature and mathematics. Additionally, an adult with such an education was considered mentally prepared for the world and its challenges.

At first, it was believed that teaching modern languages was not useful for the development of mental discipline and so they were left out of the curriculum. When modern languages began to appear in school curricula in the 19th century, teachers taught them with the same grammar–translation method as was used for Classical Latin and Ancient Greek in the 18th century. Textbooks were therefore essentially copied for the modern language classroom.

== Principles and goals ==
There are two main goals to grammar–translation classes. One is to develop students' reading ability to a level where they can read literature in the target language. The other is to develop students' general mental discipline.

Users of foreign language want to note things of their interest in the literature of foreign languages. Therefore, this method focuses on reading and writing and has developed techniques which facilitate more or less the learning of reading and writing only. As a result, speaking and listening are overlooked.

== Method ==
Grammar–translation classes are usually conducted in the students' native language. Grammatical rules are learned deductively; students learn grammar rules by rote, and then practice the rules by doing grammar drills and translating sentences to and from the target language. More attention is paid to the form of the sentences being translated than to their content. When students reach more advanced levels of achievement, they may translate entire texts from the target language. Tests often involve translating classical texts.

There is usually no listening or speaking practice, and very little attention is placed on pronunciation or any communicative aspects of the language. The skill exercised is reading and then only in the context of translation.

== Materials ==
The mainstay of classroom materials for the grammar–translation method is textbooks, which, in the 19th century, attempted to codify the grammar of the target language into discrete rules that students were to learn and memorize. A chapter in typical grammar–translation textbooks would begin with a bilingual vocabulary list and then grammatical rules for students to study and sentences for them to translate. Some typical sentences from 19th-century textbooks are as follows:

The philosopher pulled the lower jaw of the hen.

My sons have bought the mirrors of the Duke.

The cat of my aunt is more treacherous than the dog of your uncle.

== Reception ==
The method by definition has a very limited scope. Because speaking and any kind of spontaneous creative output were excluded from the curriculum, students would often fail at speaking or even letter-writing in the target language. A noteworthy quote describing the effect of the method comes from Bahlsen, a student of Plötz, a major proponent of this method in the 19th century. In commenting on writing letters or speaking, he said he would be overcome with "a veritable forest of paragraphs, and an impenetrable thicket of grammatical rules".

According to Richards and Rodgers, the grammar–translation has been rejected as a legitimate language teaching method by modern scholars:

[T]hough it may be true to say that the Grammar-Translation Method is still widely practiced, it has no advocates. It is a method for which there is no theory. There is no literature that offers a rationale or justification for it or that attempts to relate it to issues in linguistics, psychology, or educational theory

— Richards & Rodgers 2001, p. 7

== Influence ==
The grammar–translation method was the standard way languages were taught in schools from the 17th to the 19th centuries. Despite attempts at reform from Roger Ascham, Montaigne, Comenius and John Locke, no other methods then gained any significant popularity.

Later, theorists such as Viëtor, Passy, Berlitz, and Jespersen began to talk about what a new kind of foreign language instruction needed, shedding light on what the grammar–translation was missing. They supported teaching the language, not about the language, and teaching in the target language, emphasizing speech as well as text. Through grammar–translation, students lacked an active role in the classroom, often correcting their own work and strictly following the textbook.

Despite all of these drawbacks, the grammar–translation method is still a widely used language-teaching and learning process.

== See also ==
- Vocabulary learning

== Sources ==
- Bonilla Carvajal, C. A. (2013). ""Grammar-Translation Method": A linguistic historic error of perspective: Origins, dynamics and inconsistencies". Praxis & Saber. 4 (8). ISSN 2216-0159.
- Chastain, Kenneth. The Development of Modern Language Skills: Theory to Practice. Philadelphia: Center for Curriculum Development,1971.
- Rippa, S. Alexander 1971. Education in a Free Society, 2nd. Edition. New York: David McKay Company, 1971.
- Richards, Jack C.; Rodgers, Theodore S. (2001). Approaches and Methods in Language Teaching (2nd ed.). Cambridge, New York: Cambridge University Press.
- Rivers, Wilga M. Teaching Foreign Language Skills, 2nd Edition. Chicago: University of Chicago Press, 1981.
- Kho, Mu-Jeong (2016). How to Implant a Semiotic and Mathematical DNA into Learning English, Seoul: Booklab Publishing Co. ISBN 979-11-87300-04-5 (53740), 261 pages.
- Titone, Renzo (1968). Teaching Foreign Languages: An Historical Sketch. Georgetown University Press. ISBN 978-0-87840-158-1.
