= Input hypothesis =

Hypotheses of second-language acquisition

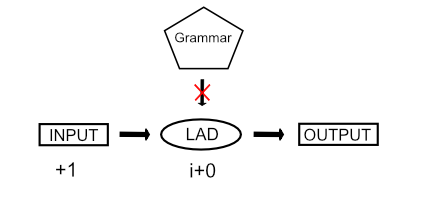
Comprehensible input hypothesis

The input hypothesis, also known as the monitor model, is a group of five hypotheses of second-language acquisition developed by the linguist Stephen Krashen in the 1970s and 1980s. Krashen originally formulated the input hypothesis as just one of the five hypotheses, but over time the term has come to refer to the five hypotheses as a group. The hypotheses are the input hypothesis, the acquisition–learning hypothesis, the monitor hypothesis, the natural order hypothesis and the affective filter hypothesis. The input hypothesis was first published in 1977.

The hypotheses put primary importance on the comprehensible input (CI) that language learners are exposed to. Understanding spoken and written language input is seen as the only mechanism that results in the increase of underlying linguistic competence, and language output is not seen as having any effect on learners' ability. Furthermore, Krashen claimed that linguistic competence is only advanced when language is subconsciously acquired, and that conscious learning cannot be used as a source of spontaneous language production. Finally, learning is seen to be heavily dependent on the mood of the learner, with learning being impaired if the learner is under stress or does not want to learn the language.

Krashen's hypotheses have been influential in language education, particularly in the United States, but have received criticism from some academics. Two of the main criticisms state that the hypotheses are untestable, and that they assume a degree of separation between acquisition and learning that has not been proven to exist.

== Overview ==
The five hypotheses that Krashen proposed are as follows:

- The input hypothesis. This states that learners progress in their knowledge of the language when they comprehend language input that is slightly more advanced than their current level. Krashen called this level of input "i+1", where "i" is the learner's interlanguage and "+1" is the next stage of language acquisition.
- The acquisition–learning hypothesis claims that there is a strict separation between acquisition and learning; Krashen saw acquisition as a purely subconscious process and learning as a conscious process, and claimed that improvement in language ability was only dependent upon acquisition and never on learning.
- The monitor hypothesis states that consciously learned language can only be used to monitor language output; it can never be the source of spontaneous speech.
- The natural order hypothesis states that language is acquired in a particular order, and that this order does not change between learners, and is not affected by explicit instruction.
- The affective filter hypothesis. This states that learners' ability to acquire language is constrained if they are experiencing negative emotions such as fear or embarrassment. At such times the affective filter is said to be "up".

== Input hypothesis ==
If i represents previously acquired linguistic competence and extra-linguistic knowledge, the hypothesis claims that we move from i to i+1 by understanding input that contains i+1. Extra-linguistic knowledge includes our knowledge of the world and of the situation, that is, the context. The +1 represents 'the next increment' of new knowledge or language structure that will be within the learner's capacity to acquire.

'Comprehensible input' is the crucial and necessary ingredient for the acquisition of language. The comprehensible input hypothesis can be restated in terms of the natural order hypothesis. For example, if we acquire the rules of language in a linear order (1, 2, 3...), then i represents the last rule or language form learned, and i+1 is the next structure that should be learned. It must be stressed, however, that just any input is not sufficient; the input received must be comprehensible. According to Krashen, there are three corollaries to his theory.

=== Corollaries of the input hypothesis ===
1. Talking (output) is not practicing.
  Krashen stresses yet again that speaking in the target language does not result in language acquisition. Although speaking can indirectly assist in language acquisition, the ability to speak is not the cause of language learning or acquisition. Instead, comprehensible output is the effect of language acquisition.
2. When enough comprehensible input is provided, i+1 is present.
  If language models and teachers provide enough comprehensible input, then the structures that acquirers are ready to learn will be present in that input. According to Krashen, this is a better method of developing grammatical accuracy than direct grammar teaching.
3. The teaching order is not based on the natural order.
  Instead, students will acquire the language in a natural order by receiving comprehensible input.

== Acquisition-learning hypothesis ==
In modern linguistics, there are many theories as to how humans are able to develop language ability. According to Stephen Krashen's acquisition-learning hypothesis, there are two independent ways in which we develop our linguistic skills: acquisition and learning. This theory is at the core of modern language acquisition theory, and is perhaps the most fundamental of Krashen's theories.

Acquisition of language is a natural, intuitive, and subconscious process of which individuals need not be aware. One is unaware of the process as it is happening and, when the new knowledge is acquired, the acquirer generally does not realize that they possess any new knowledge. According to Krashen, both adults and children can subconsciously acquire language, and either written or oral language can be acquired. This process is similar to the process that children undergo when learning their native language. Acquisition requires meaningful interaction in the target language, during which the acquirer is focused on meaning rather than form.

Learning a language, on the other hand, is a conscious process, much like what one experiences in school. New knowledge or language forms are represented consciously in the learner's mind, frequently in the form of language "rules" and "grammar", and the process often involves error correction. Language learning involves formal instruction and, according to Krashen, is less effective than acquisition. Learning in this sense is conception or conceptualisation: instead of learning a language itself, students learn an abstract, conceptual model of a language, a "theory" about a language (a grammar).

== Monitor hypothesis ==
The monitor hypothesis asserts that a learner's learned system acts as a monitor to what they are producing. In other words, while only the acquired system is able to produce spontaneous speech, the learned system is used to check what is being spoken.

Before the learner produces an utterance, they internally scan it for errors, and uses the learned system to make corrections. Self-correction occurs when the learner uses the Monitor to correct a sentence after it is uttered. According to the hypothesis, such self-monitoring and self-correction are the only functions of conscious language learning.

The Monitor model then predicts faster initial progress by adults than children, as adults use this ‘monitor’ when producing L2 (target language) utterances before having acquired the ability for natural performance, and adult learners will input more into conversations earlier than children.

=== Three conditions for use of the monitor ===
According to Krashen, for the Monitor to be successfully used, three conditions must be met:

1. The acquirer/learner must know the rule
  This is a very difficult condition to meet because it means that the speaker must have had explicit instruction on the language form that they are trying to produce.
2. The acquirer must be focused on correctness
  They must be thinking about form, and it is difficult to focus on meaning and form at the same time.
3. The acquirer/learner must have time to use the monitor
  Using the monitor requires the speaker to slow down and focus on form.

=== Difficulties using the monitor ===
There are many difficulties with the use of the monitor, making the monitor rather weak as a language tool.

1. Knowing the rule: this is a difficult condition to meet, because even the best students do not learn every rule that is taught, cannot remember every rule they have learned, and can't always correctly apply the rules they do remember. Furthermore, not every rule of a language is always included in a text or taught by the teacher.
2. Having time to use the monitor: there is a price that is paid for the use of the monitor- the speaker is then focused on form rather than meaning, resulting in the production and exchange of less information, thus slowing the flow of conversation. Some speakers over-monitor to the point that the conversation is painfully slow and sometimes difficult to listen to.
3. The rules of language make up only a small portion of our language competence: Acquisition does not provide 100% language competence. There is often a small portion of grammar, punctuation, and spelling that even the most proficient native speakers may not acquire. While it is important to learn these aspects of language, since writing is the only form that requires 100% competence, these aspects of language make up only a small portion of our language competence.

Due to these difficulties, Krashen recommends using the monitor at times when it does not interfere with communication, such as while writing.

== Natural order hypothesis ==
The natural order hypothesis states that all learners acquire a language in roughly the same order. This order is not dependent on the ease with which a particular language feature can be taught; some features, such as third-person "-s" ("he runs") in English, are easy to teach in a classroom setting, but are not typically acquired until the later stages of language acquisition. This hypothesis was based on the morpheme studies by Dulay and Burt, which found that certain morphemes were predictably learned before others during the course of second-language acquisition.

== Affective filter hypothesis ==
The affective filter is an impediment to learning or acquisition caused by negative emotional ("affective") responses to one's environment. It is a hypothesis of second-language acquisition theory, and a field of interest in educational psychology and general education.

According to the affective filter hypothesis, certain emotions, such as anxiety, self-doubt, and mere boredom interfere with the process of acquiring a second language. They function as a filter between the speaker and the listener that reduces the amount of language input the listener is able to understand. These negative emotions prevent efficient processing of the language input. The hypothesis further states that the blockage can be reduced by sparking interest, providing low-anxiety environments, and bolstering the learner's self-esteem.

According to Krashen (1982), there are ways to lower the affective filter. One is allowing for a silent period (not expecting the student to speak before they have received an adequate amount of comprehensible input according to their individual needs). A teacher needs to be aware of the student's home life, as this domain is the biggest contributor to the affective filter. It is also important to take into note that those who are learning English for the first time in the USA have many hurdles to get over. To lower the affective filter, a teacher needs to not add to the hurdles to jump over.

== Reception and influence ==
According to Wolfgang Butzkamm & John A. W. Caldwell (2009), comprehensible input, defined by Krashen as understanding messages, is indeed the necessary condition for acquisition, but it is not sufficient. Learners will crack the speech code only if they receive input that is comprehended at two levels. They must not only understand what is meant but also how things are quite literally expressed, i.e. how the different meaning components are put together to produce the message. This is the principle of dual comprehension. In many cases, both types of understanding can be conflated into one process, in others not. The German phrase "Wie spät ist es?" is perfectly understood as "What time is it?" However, learners need to know more: *How late is it? That's what the Germans say literally, which gives us the anatomy of the phrase, and the logic behind it. Only now is understanding complete, and we come into full possession of the phrase which can become a recipe for many more sentences, such as "Wie alt ist es?" / "How old is it?" etc. According to Butzkamm & Caldwell (2009:64) "dually comprehended language input is the fuel for our language learning capacities". It is both necessary and sufficient.

The theory underlies Krashen and Terrell's comprehension-based language learning methodology known as the natural approach (1983). The Focal Skills approach, first developed in 1988, is also based on the theory.

The most popular competitors are the skill-building hypothesis and the comprehensible output hypothesis. The input hypothesis is related to instructional scaffolding.

== Applications in language teaching ==
The input hypothesis is often applied in practice with TPR Storytelling.

=== Levels ===
Krashen designates learners into beginner and intermediate levels:

=== Beginning level ===
Class time is filled with comprehensible oral input

- Teachers must modify their speech so that it is comprehensible
- Demands for speaking (output) are low; students are not forced to speak until ready
- Grammar instruction is only included for students high school age and older

=== Intermediate level ===
- Teaching uses comprehensible input drawn from academic texts, but modified so that subject-matter is sheltered, or limited. (Note that sheltered subject-matter teaching is not for beginners or native speakers of the target language.)
- In sheltered instruction classes, the focus is on meaning, not form.

As a practical matter, comprehensible input works with the following teaching techniques:

1. The teacher should slow down and speak clearly and slowly, using short sentences and clauses.
2. The teacher needs to prepare and use graphical or visual aids.
3. Courses should use textbooks or supporting materials that are not overly cluttered.
4. For students above 2nd grade, a study guide is useful.
5. Classes should make use of multi-modal teaching techniques.
6. Students may read aloud, with other students paraphrasing what they said.
7. A small set of content vocabulary used repeatedly will be more easily acquired and allow students to acquire language structures.

== Critiques of the Comprehensible Input Hypothesis ==
Since its inception, Stephen Krashen’s Comprehensible Input (CI) Hypothesis has been controversial and criticized by many scholars in the field of second language acquisition (SLA). Some researchers have argued that the theory lacks testability, is conceptually ambiguous, and exaggerates the role of “comprehensible input” in language acquisition. Recent developments in cognitive neuroscience suggest that language learning is not a mere absorption of linguistic information, but rather an interactive, embodied, and highly neuroplastic process. Brain imaging studies have shown that active language use, social interaction, and direct feedback activate significantly more brain regions than taking in comprehensible information alone.

In the 2020s, a new line of critique emerged that combined findings from linguistic neuroscience, ecological psychology, and adaptive learning technologies. These approaches argue that language acquisition should be understood as a dynamic coupling between the brain and the environment, rather than as a linear processing of linguistic input as demonstrated in the Input Hypothesis diagram. This line of language educational philosophy emphasizes the role of social interaction, multimodal experience, and affordance-rich contexts, and points out the conceptual and empirical limitations of the i+1 model when applied to modern personalized learning environments. Quang N. Nguyen and Doan (2025) critiqued the explanatory scope of Krashen's i+1 principle from a neuro-ecological perspective, arguing that language learning involves learners perceiving and acting on affordances arising through interactions with their social, material, and technological environments.

== See also ==
- Language acquisition
- Second language acquisition
- Stephen Krashen
