= Total physical response =

Language teaching method

Total physical response (TPR) is a language teaching method developed by James Asher, a professor emeritus of psychology at San José State University. It is based on the coordination of language and physical movement. In TPR, instructors give commands to students in the target language with body movements, and students respond with whole-body actions.

The method is an example of the comprehension approach to language teaching. Listening and responding (with actions) serves two purposes: It is a means of quickly recognizing meaning in the language being learned, and a means of passively learning the structure of the language itself. Grammar is not taught explicitly but can be learned from the language input. TPR is a valuable way to learn vocabulary, especially idiomatic terms, e.g., phrasal verbs.

Asher developed TPR as a result of his experiences observing young children learning their first language. He noticed that interactions between parents and children often took the form of speech from the parent followed by a physical response from the child. Asher made three hypotheses based on his observations: first, that language is learned primarily by listening; second, that language learning must engage the right hemisphere of the brain; and third, that learning language should not involve any stress.

TPR is often used alongside other methods and techniques. It is popular with beginners and with young learners, although it can be used with students of all levels and all age groups.

== Background ==
James Asher developed the total physical response (TPR) method as a result of his observation of the language development of young children. Asher saw that most of the interactions that young children experience with parents or other adults combine both verbal and physical aspects. The child responds physically to the speech of the parent, and the parent reinforces the child's responses through further speech. This creates a positive feedback loop between the parent's speech and the child's actions. Asher also observed that young children typically spend a long time listening to language before ever attempting to speak, and that they can understand and react to utterances that are much more complex than those they can produce themselves.

From his experiences, Asher outlined three main hypotheses about learning second languages that are embodied in the TPR method. The first is that the brain is naturally predisposed to learn language through listening. Specifically, Asher says that learners best internalize language when they respond with physical movement to language input. Asher hypothesizes that speech develops naturally and spontaneously after learners internalize the target language through input, and that it should not be forced. In Asher's own words:

A reasonable hypothesis is that the brain and the nervous system are biologically programmed to acquire language, either the first or the second in a particular sequence and in a particular mode. The sequence is listening before speaking and the mode is to synchronise language with the individual's body.

The second of Asher's hypotheses is that effective language learning must engage the right hemisphere of the brain. Physical movement is controlled primarily by the right hemisphere, and Asher sees the coupling of movement with language comprehension as the key to language acquisition. He says that left-hemisphere learning should be avoided, and that the left hemisphere needs a great deal of experience of right-hemisphere-based input before natural speech can occur.

Asher's third hypothesis is that language learning should not involve any stress, as stress and negative emotions inhibit the natural language-learning process. He regards the stressful nature of most language-teaching methods as one of their major weaknesses. Asher recommends that teachers focus on meaning and physical movement to avoid stress.

The main text on TPR is James Asher's Learning Another Language through Actions, first published in 1977.

== Principles ==
TPR is an example of the comprehension approach to language teaching. Methods in the comprehension approach emphasize the importance of listening to language development and do not require spoken output in the early stages of learning. In TPR, students are not forced to speak. Instead, teachers wait until students acquire enough language through listening that they start to speak spontaneously. At the beginning stages of instruction students can respond to the instructor in their native language.

While the majority of class time is spent on listening comprehension, the ultimate goal of the method is to develop oral fluency. Asher sees developing listening comprehension skills as the most efficient way of developing spoken language skills.

Lessons in TPR are organized around grammar, and in particular around the verb. Instructors issue commands based on the verbs and vocabulary to be learned in that lesson. However, the primary focus in lessons is on meaning, which distinguishes TPR from other grammar-based methods such as grammar-translation.

Grammar is not explicitly taught, but is learned by induction. Students are expected to subconsciously acquire the grammatical structure of the language through exposure to spoken language input, in addition to decoding the messages in the input to find their meaning. This approach to listening is called codebreaking.

TPR is both a teaching technique and a philosophy of language teaching. Teachers do not have to limit themselves to TPR techniques to teach according to the principles of the method.

Because the students are only expected to listen and not to speak, the teacher has the sole responsibility for deciding what input students hear.

== Procedure ==
The majority of class time in TPR lessons is spent with language-body conversations as Asher refers to it, in which the instructor gives commands using the imperative mood. Students respond to these commands with physical actions. Initially, students learn the meaning of the commands they hear by direct observation. After they learn the meaning of the words in these commands, the teacher issues commands that use novel combinations of the words the students have learned in which they respond with a physical action modeled by the instructor. For instance, if the teacher says, "Stand up and clap." students watch the instructor model the utterance before they act it out themselves to show comprehension.

Instructors limit the number of new vocabulary items given to students at any one time. This is to help students differentiate the new words from those previously learned, and to facilitate integration with their existing language knowledge. Asher suggests that students can learn between 12 and 36 words for every hour of instruction, depending on their language level and class size.

While procedures using the imperative are the mainstay of classes, teachers can use other activities as well. Some typical other activities are role plays, skits, storytelling and slide presentations. However, beginners are not made to learn conversational dialogs until 120 hours into their course.

There is little error correction in TPR. Asher advises teachers to treat learners' mistakes the same way a parent would treat their children's. Errors made by beginning-level students are usually overlooked, but as students become more advanced teachers may correct more of their errors. This is similar to parents raising their children: as children get older, parents tend to correct their grammatical mistakes more often.

According to Asher, TPR lesson plans should contain the detailed commands that the teacher intends to use. He says, "It is wise to write out the exact utterances you will be using and especially the novel commands because the action is so fast-moving there is usually not time for you to create spontaneously."

== Teaching materials ==
TPR lessons typically use a wide variety of realia, posters, and props. Teaching materials are not compulsory, and for the very first lessons they may not be used. As students progress in ability the teacher may begin to use objects found in the classroom such as furniture or books, and later may use word charts, pictures, and realia.

There are a number of specialized TPR teaching products available, including student kits and storytelling materials developed by Asher and other authors.

== Research ==
Asher conducted a large number of scientific studies to test and refine his hypotheses and the teaching practices in TPR. When testing children and adults learning Russian, Asher and Price found that the adults outperformed the children. TPR is one of the most thoroughly researched approaches in the field. All of the pertinent research is summarized in Asher's Learning Another Language Through Actions book.

Research performed in Turkey in 2018 on TPR by Adnan Oflaz showed that using the method can significantly reduce anxiety in students. Over the course of Oflaz's research of using the TPR method for two hours a week over a six-week period, "those [students] whose anxiety levels were high and those who experienced anxiety very close to high level ... went down to medium level." Oflaz also observed that the students were more willing to speak in German (which was the target language), that they didn't purposefully avoid situations in which they needed to speak in the target language, and that some students were even "eager to take turns to speak."

== Reception ==
According to the Routledge Encyclopedia of Language Teaching and Learning, TPR is often criticized as being only suitable for beginning students. However, the encyclopedia goes on to note that there are several publications available about how to use TPR with intermediate and advanced students.

According to its proponents, TPR has a number of advantages: Students enjoy getting out of their chairs and moving around. Simple TPR activities do not require a great deal of preparation on the part of the teacher. TPR is aptitude-free, working well with a mixed ability class, and with students having various disabilities. It is good for kinesthetic learners who need to be active in the class. Class size need not be a problem, and it works effectively for children and adults.

However, it is recognized that TPR is most useful for beginners, though it can be used at higher levels where preparation becomes an issue for the teacher. It does not give students the opportunity to express their own thoughts in a creative way. Further, it is easy to overuse TPR—"Any novelty, if carried on too long, will trigger adaptation." It can be a challenge for shy students. Additionally, the nature of TPR places an unnaturally heavy emphasis on the use of the imperative mood, that is to say commands such as sit down and stand up. These features are of limited utility to the learner, and can lead to a learner appearing rude when attempting to use their new language. As a TPR class progresses, group activities and descriptions can extend basic TPR concepts into full communication situations.

Because of its participatory approach, TPR may also be a useful alternative teaching strategy for students with dyslexia or related learning disabilities, who typically experience difficulty learning foreign languages with traditional classroom instruction.

== Influence ==
Teachers who use TPR typically use it together with a variety of other activities and techniques. In line with Asher's recommendations for using the approach, it is most often used for introducing new vocabulary. In a controlled comparison in EFL vocabulary instruction, a 2025 study with Arabic-speaking learners reported significantly higher post-test scores for a Total Physical Response (TPR) group than for a group taught the same items using Kahoot. This is the case in The Polis Institute, a school for ancient languages and the humanities in Jerusalem (Israel), which employs TPR within the Polis Method of teaching ancient and modern languages.

Blaine Ray, a Spanish language teacher, added stories to TPR to help students acquire non-physical language, creating the foundation of the method known as Teaching Proficiency through Reading and Storytelling (TPRS) built on Stephen Krashen's theories of language acquisition. It should be clarified that TPRS, which stands for "Teaching Proficiency through Reading and Storytelling, is not directly associated with "Total Physical Response" (TPR) in spite of the similarity of their names.

Todd McKay conducted the first empirical study of the effectiveness of Total Physical Response (TPR) combined with storytelling. Stories had been incorporated into TPR as early as 1972. In the comparative study with Asher, McKay found that children who were exposed to TPR Storytelling outperformed similar students trained using grammar-translation and ALM. The ability of those students to comprehend a never before heard story was statistically (p-value of 0.001) greater than that of the control group. This study can be found in McKay's TPR Storytelling Teacher's Guidebook.

== See also ==
- "Where are your keys?"
