= Jack C. Richards =

New Zealand linguist (born 1943)

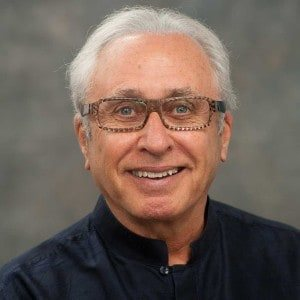
- Born: July 28, 1943 (age 83)
- Education: Victoria University of Wellington (MA, 1966); Université Laval (PhD, 1972)
- Occupations: Applied linguist, author, educator
- Known for: Second-language teaching methodology, teacher education, ELT materials design
- Notable work: Interchange; Approaches and Methods in Language Teaching; Longman Dictionary of Language Teaching and Applied Linguistics
- Awards: Honorary D.Litt., Victoria University of Wellington (2011); TESOL International "50 at 50" (2016); Arts Foundation of New Zealand Award for Patronage (2014)

Jack Croft Richards (born 28 July 1943) is an applied linguist from New Zealand, specializing in second and foreign language education, teacher training, and materials design. He is the grandson of the New Zealand organ builder George Croft.

He has written numerous articles and books. Most of his books and articles are in the field of second language teaching and have been translated into many different languages. He was appointed full professor in the Department of English as a Second Language at the University of Hawaii in 1981 and later served as full professor in universities in Hong Kong and New Zealand.

He earned a Master of Arts with first-class honours in English from Victoria University of Wellington in 1966 and a Ph.D. in Applied Linguistics from Laval University (a French language university in Quebec, Canada) in 1972.

== Education ==
He earned a Master of Arts with first-class honours in English from Victoria University of Wellington in 1966 and a Ph.D. in Applied Linguistics from Laval University (a French language university in Quebec, Canada) in 1972.

== Career ==
Richards began his career in Southeast Asia, teaching in Indonesia after completing his doctorate. He then joined Singapore's Regional Language Centre (RELC) as a specialist in applied linguistics, supported by the New Zealand government.

While at RELC, Richards joined the editorial board of the RELC Journal when it was launched in 1970, and remained closely associated with the journal for more than five decades, latterly as associate editor, before stepping down in 2021; SEAMEO–RELC credited him with guiding the journal’s growth into a publication indexed in the Social Sciences Citation Index.

In the late 1970s, he moved to Chinese University of Hong Kong, before being appointed full professor in the Department of English as a Second Language at the University of Hawai in 1981.

In 1989, he returned to Hong Kong to establish and lead the new Department of English at City University of Hong Kong as chair professor. At the time of its founding the institution was still known as City Polytechnic of Hong Kong, attaining university status in 1994; Richards served as the department’s founding head until 1996, building its curriculum and academic staffing from the ground up. [34][37] In 1996, Richards established a master’s program in English at the University of Auckland. He retired from full-time appointments in 1999, after which he continued to teach workshops at RELC Singapore, and Sydney University, and Victoria University as an honorary or adjunct professor.

== Publications and major works ==
Richards is an author and educator, with over 150 books and articles to his name. His landmark works include Error Analysis (1974), a foundational early text in research and pedagogy in second-language acquisition. He is also the author and co-author of many widely used textbooks for learners of English including the best-selling series Interchange (5th ed., 2017) which has sold more than 50 million copies world-wide.

In applied linguistics his co-authored Approaches and Methods in Language Teaching (with Theodore S. Rodgers) is now in its third edition (2014), and he authored Curriculum Development in Language Teaching (2nd ed., 2017).

Richards’s other influential publications include The Longman Dictionary of Language Teaching and Applied Linguistics (with Richard Schmidt, 2010), The Language Teaching Matrix (1990), Reflective Teaching in Second Language Classrooms (with Charles Lockhart, 1996), Key Issues in Language Teaching (2015), and Teaching and Learning in English Medium Instruction (with Jack Pun, 2022).

He has also contributed to and edited major volumes such as Language Learning Beyond the Classroom (with David Nunan, 2014) and The Cambridge Guide to Pedagogy and Practice in Language Teaching (with Anne Burns, 2012),

== Recognition and honours ==
In 2011, Victoria University of Wellington awarded him an honorary Doctor of Literature degree for his contributions to English language teaching and the arts.

That same year, he was appointed honorary professor at the University of Sydney; in 2014, he received the Award for Patronage from the Arts Foundation of New Zealand and became honorary professor at the University of Auckland.

During its 50th anniversary in 2016, TESOL International recognized Richards as one of "50 at 50", identifying him among the most influential language-teaching specialists of the prior fifty years.

== Legacy and scholarly impact ==
Richards is internationally known for his contributions to applied linguistics, particularly in second language acquisition, language teaching methodology, curriculum development, and teacher education. Over five decades, his work has shaped both academic discourse and classroom practice in English language teaching worldwide.

In 2023, Language Teaching Research Quarterly published a special issue in tribute to Richards’s six-decade contribution to the field, including an editorial marking his influence on the profession and a systematic review co-authored by Richards himself cataloguing his journal articles, books, and book chapters across 24 journals and 18 disciplines and sub-disciplines.

His early research on error analysis, including Error Analysis: Perspectives on Second Language Acquisition (1974), was influential in the study of learner errors and interlanguage development. He has also advanced the concept of reflective teaching through works such as Beyond Training (1998) and Professional Development for Language Teachers (with Thomas Farrell, 2005). More recent collaborations examine evolving pedagogies and learning contexts.

== Philanthropy and arts patronage ==
Richards has also promoted creativity in language teaching, encouraging student centered and open ended tasks. Beyond linguistics, he is active in philanthropy, funding grants and scholarships in applied linguistics, music, and the arts, and has published on his decorative arts collection in Lalique Vases: The New Zealand Collection of Dr. Jack C. Richards (2011).

His arts patronage has included sponsoring composer Gareth Farr’s first piano concerto (2014), funding debut recordings by pianists Lixin Zhang and Tony Chen Lin on the Rattle Records label, and supporting the Gisborne International Music Competition and the NZCT Chamber Music Contest; he has said that royalties from his textbooks have enabled this support for performers and composers.

== Awards ==
In 2011 he was awarded the honorary degree of Doctor of Literature by Victoria University, Wellington, in respect of his impacts to English language teaching and the arts.

In 2011, Richards was made an honorary professor in the Faculty of Education at the University of Sydney, Australia.

In 2014, Richards was made an honorary professor in the Faculty of Education at the University of Auckland, New Zealand.

Also in 2014, Richards received the prestigious Award for Patronage 2014, by the Arts Foundation of New Zealand, acknowledging his support for music and the arts.

== Selected publications ==
=== Books ===
- Richards, J. C. (2017). Curriculum Development in Language Teaching (2nd ed.). Cambridge University Press.
- Nunan, D., & Richards, J. C. (2014). Language Learning Beyond the Classroom (ESL & Applied Linguistics Professional Series) (1st ed.). Routledge.
- Richards, J. C. (2015). Key Issues in Language Teaching (1st ed.). Cambridge University Press.
- Richards, J. C., & Rodgers, T. S. (2014). Approaches and Methods in Language Teaching (Cambridge Language Teaching Library) (3rd ed.). Cambridge University Press.
- Richards, J. C., & Schmidt, R. W. (2010). Longman Dictionary of Language Teaching and Applied Linguistics (4th ed.). Routledge.
- Richards, J. C., & Renandya, W. A. (2002). Methodology in Language Teaching: An Anthology of Current Practice (1st ed.). Cambridge University Press.

==== Classroom Texts & Series ====
- 2019. Four Corners. (with David Bolhke) 2nd edition. Levels 1,2,3,4.
- 2017. Interchange. (with J. Hull and S Proctor) 5th edition. Levels 1,2,3
- 2012. Speak Now. (with David Bohlke). Levels 1,2,3.
- 2011. Tactics for Listening. (3 level series). 3rd edition
- 2004. Connect. (with C.Sandy and C. Barbesan)

=== Articles ===
- Sadeghi, K., Richards, J. C., & Ghaderi, F. (2019). Perceived versus Measured Teaching Effectiveness: Does Teacher Proficiency Matter? RELC Journal, 51(2), 280–293. https://doi.org/10.1177/0033688219845933
- Richards, J. C., & Wilson, O. (2019). On Transidentitying. RELC Journal, 50(1), 179–187. https://doi.org/10.1177/0033688218824780
- Richards, J. C. (2015a). The Changing Face of Language Learning: Learning Beyond the Classroom. RELC Journal, 46(1), 5–22. https://doi.org/10.1177/0033688214561621
