= Tracy D. Terrell =

American linguist (1943–1991)

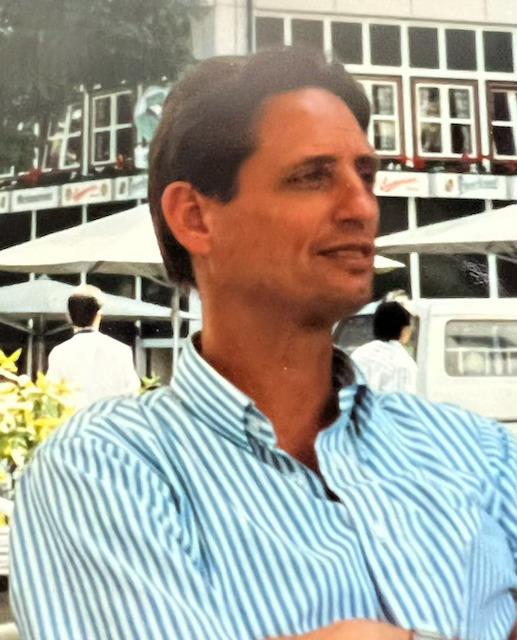
- Born: June 23, 1943
- Died: December 2, 1991 (aged 48)

Tracy Dale Terrell (June 23, 1943 – December 2, 1991) was an American education theorist who, along with Stephen Krashen, wrote The Natural Approach. The natural approach is a comprehension-based language learning methodology which emphasizes the idea of exposure and the lowering of affective or emotional barriers to learning.

Terrell was a professor at the University of California, San Diego.

== Career ==
Tracy D. Terrell graduated from the University of Texas at Austin with a Ph.D. in linguistics and in a comparatively short career of twenty-two years became one of the most important American Hispanists and theoretical linguists. He taught at the University of California, Irvine from 1970 until 1985 when he accepted a position in the linguistics department at the University of California, San Diego. He retired in 1989, finally succumbing to AIDS in 1991. He is credited along with Stephen Krashen with the development of the “Natural Approach” to second language learning, now a widely utilized method of teaching second languages. In addition, he is widely respected for his work in Hispanic linguistics. Dr. Terrell was fluent in Spanish, French, German, Italian, Portuguese, and Dutch—for which he had a special affection.

== Partial bibliography ==
- The natural approach: Language acquisition in the classroom, Hayward, CA : Alemany Press, 1983.
- Dos Mundos, Spanish language textbook, McGraw-Hill
- Deux Mondes, French language textbook, McGraw-Hill
- Kontakte, German language textbook, McGraw-Hill
- Bravo, Spanish language textbook, Glencoe (McGraw-Hill)

=== Journal articles ===
- Terrell, T. D. (1980). A Natural Approach to the Teaching of Verb Forms and Function in Spanish. Foreign Language Annals, 13(2), 129-136.
- Krashen, S. D., Terrell, T. D., Ehrman, M. E., & Herzog, M. (1984). A Theoretical Basis for Teaching the Receptive Skills. Foreign Language Annals, 17(4), 261–275.
- Terrell, T. D. (1977). A Natural Approach to Second Language Acquisition and Learning1. The Modern Language Journal, 61(7), 325–337.
