= Stephen Krashen =

American linguist

- Born: May 14, 1941 (age 85); Chicago, Illinois, U.S.

Academic background
- Education: University of California, Los Angeles (PhD)

Academic work
- Discipline: Linguist
- Institutions: University of Southern California
- Main interests: Second-language acquisition
- Website: www.sdkrashen.com

Stephen D. Krashen (born May 14, 1941) is an American linguist known for developing the input hypothesis, a group of five hypotheses of second-language acquisition. He is a professor emeritus of education at the University of Southern California. He moved from the linguistics department to the faculty of the School of Education in 1994.

== Work ==
Stephen Krashen received a Ph.D. in linguistics from the University of California, Los Angeles, in 1972. Krashen has among papers (peer-reviewed and not) and books, more than 486 publications, contributing to the fields of second-language acquisition, bilingual education, and reading. He introduced various hypotheses related to second-language acquisition, including the acquisition-learning hypothesis, the input hypothesis, the monitor hypothesis, the affective filter, and the natural order hypothesis. Most recently, Krashen promotes the use of free voluntary reading during second-language acquisition, which he says "is the most powerful tool we have in language education, first and second."

== Awards ==
- 1982: Winner of the Mildenberger Award, given for his book, Second Language Acquisition and Second Language Learning (Prentice-Hall).
- 1985: Co-winner of the Pimsleur Award, given by the American Council of Foreign Language Teachers for the best published article.
- 1986: His paper "Lateralisation, language learning and the critical period" was selected as Citation Class by Current Contents.
- 1993: The Distinguished Presentation related to School Library Media Centers, was awarded to by editors of the School Library Media Annual.
- 2005: Krashen was inducted into the International Reading Association's Reading Hall of Fame.
- 2005: Elected at the National Association for Bilingual Education Executive Board.

== Educational policy activism ==
As education policy in Krashen's home state of California became increasingly hostile to bilingualism, he responded with research critical of the new policies, public speaking engagements, and with letters written to newspaper editors. During the campaign to enact an anti-bilingual education law in California in 1998, known as Proposition 227, Krashen campaigned aggressively in public forums, media talk shows, and conducted numerous interviews with journalists writing on the subject. After other anti-bilingual education campaigns and attempts to enact regressive language education policies surfaced around the country, by 2006, it was estimated that Krashen had submitted well over 1,000 letters to editors.

Krashen has been an advocate for a more activist role by researchers in combating what he considers the public's misconceptions about bilingual education. Addressing the question of how to explain public opposition to bilingual education, Krashen queried, "Is it due to a stubborn disinformation campaign on the part of newspapers and other news media to deliberately destroy bilingual education? Or is it due to the failure of the profession to present its side of the story to reporters? There is a great deal of anecdotal evidence in support of the latter." Continuing, Krashen wrote, "Without a serious, dedicated and organized campaign to explain and defend bilingual education at the national level, in a very short time we will have nothing left to defend."

== Writing ==
- Krashen, Stephen D. (1981). Second Language Acquisition and Second Language Learning (PDF). Oxford: Pergamon. Archived (PDF) from the original on 2022-10-09.
- Krashen, Stephen D. (1982). Principles and Practice in Second Language Acquisition (PDF). Oxford: Pergamon. Archived (PDF) from the original on 2022-10-09.
- Krashen, Stephen D.; Terrell, Tracy D. (1983). The natural approach: Language acquisition in the classroom (PDF). New York: Prentice-Hall. Archived (PDF) from the original on 2022-10-09.
- Krashen, Stephen D. (1985), The Input Hypothesis: Issues and Implications, New York: Longman
- Krashen, Stephen D. (1989), "We Acquire Vocabulary and Spelling by Reading: Additional Evidence for the Input Hypothesis" (PDF), The Modern Language Journal, 73 (4): 440–464, doi:10.1111/j.1540-4781.1989.tb05325.x, archived (PDF) from the original on 2022-10-09
- Krashen, Stephen D. (1996), "The case for narrow listening" (PDF), System, 24 (1): 97–100, doi:10.1016/0346-251X(95)00054-N, archived (PDF) from the original on 2022-10-09
- Mason, Beniko; Krashen, Stephen D. (1997), "Extensive reading in English as a foreign language", System, 25 (1): 91–102, doi:10.1016/S0346-251X(96)00063-2
- Krashen, Stephen D. (2002), "The Comprehension Hypothesis and its Rivals" (PDF), Selected papers from the Eleventh International Symposium on English Teaching/Fourth Pan-Asian Conference, Taipei: Crane Publishing Company, pp. 395–404, archived (PDF) from the original on 2022-10-09
- Krashen, Stephen D. (2003), Explorations in Language Acquisition and Use (PDF), Portsmouth: NH: Heinemann., archived (PDF) from the original on 2022-10-09
- McQuillan, Jeff; Krashen, Stephen D. (2008), "Commentary: Can free reading take you all the way? A response to Cobb (2007)", Language Learning & Technology, 6 (27): 104–109, doi:10.64152/10125/44133, hdl:10125/44133
- Jarvis, Huw; Krashen, Stephen D. (2014), "Is CALL obsolete? Language Acquisition and Language Learning Revisited in a Digital Age", Tesl-Ej, 17 (4): 1–6, ISSN 1072-4303
- Krashen, Stephen D. (2014). The Common Core: Ignoring Education's Real Problems (PDF). skrashen.blogspot.com: Talking Points 28 (1): 26-28, 2014.). Archived (PDF) from the original on 2022-10-09.
