= Crosslinguistic influence =

Ways bilingual people's languages influence their use of the other

Crosslinguistic influence (CLI) refers to the different ways in which one language can affect another within an individual speaker. It typically involves two languages that can affect one another in a bilingual speaker. An example of CLI is the influence of Korean on a Korean native speaker who is learning Japanese or French. Less typically, it could also refer to an interaction between different dialects in the mind of a monolingual speaker. CLI can be observed across subsystems of languages including pragmatics, semantics, syntax, morphology, phonology, phonetics, and orthography. Discussed further in this article are particular subcategories of CLI—transfer, attrition, the complementarity principle, and additional theories.

== History ==
The question of how languages influence one another within a bilingual individual can be addressed both with respect to mature bilinguals and with respect to bilingual language acquisition. With respect to bilingual language acquisition in children, there are several hypotheses that examine the internal representation of bilinguals' languages. Volterra and Taeschner proposed the Single System Hypothesis, which states that children start out with one single system that develops into two systems. This hypothesis proposed that bilingual children go through three stages of acquisition.

- In Stage I there is a single lexicon that contains words from both languages, and there is a single syntactic system. Children in this stage will never have a translation equivalent for a word in the other language. Translation equivalents are two corresponding words in two separate languages with the same meaning. Also, it is common for the child to use two different languages in a single utterance. The syntactic rules are hard to define because of the lack of two-word and three-word utterances by the bilingual child.
- In Stage II there are two lexicons, but there is one syntactic system. In addition, there is evidence for language separation because at this stage children become less likely to mix their languages. Across both languages, the same syntactic rules are applied. For example, Japanese has subject–object–verb word order (SOV), and English has subject–verb–object word order (SVO). An English-Japanese bilingual might apply only one of these word orders to all utterances, regardless of what language the utterance is in.
- In Stage III there are two lexicons and two syntactic systems, with adult-like separation of the languages. When a child reaches this stage, they are considered fully bilingual.

In response to the Single System Hypothesis, a different hypothesis developed regarding the idea of two separate language systems from the very beginning. It was based on evidence of monolinguals and bilinguals reaching the same milestones at approximately the same stage of development. For example, bilingual and monolingual children go through identical patterns of grammar development. This hypothesis, called the Separate Development Hypothesis, held the notion that the bilinguals acquiring two languages would internalize and acquire the two languages separately. Evidence for this hypothesis comes from lack of transfer and lack of acceleration. Transfer is a grammatical property of one language used in another language. Acceleration is the acquisition of a feature in language A facilitating the acquisition of a feature in language B. In a study of Dutch-English bilingual children, there were no instances of transfer across elements of morphology and syntactic development, indicating that the two languages developed separately from each other. In addition, in a study of French-English bilingual children, there were no instances of acceleration because finiteness appeared much earlier in French than it did in English, suggesting that there was no facilitation of the acquisition of finiteness in English by acquisition in French. Under this hypothesis, bilingual acquisition would be equivalent to monolingual children acquiring the particular languages.

In response to both the previous hypotheses mentioned, the Interdependent Development Hypothesis emerged with the idea that there is some sort of interaction between the two language systems in acquisition. It proposed that there is no single language system, but the language systems are not completely separate either. This hypothesis is also known as the Crosslinguistic Hypothesis, developed by Hulk and Müller. The Crosslinguistic Hypothesis states that influence will occur in bilingual acquisition in areas of particular difficulty, even for monolingual native language acquisition. It re-examined the extent of the differentiation of the language systems due to the interaction in difficult areas of bilingual acquisition. Evidence for this hypothesis comes from delay, acceleration, and transfer in particular areas of bilingual language acquisition. Delay is the acquisition of a property of language A later than normally expected because of the acquisition of language B. CLI is seen when the child has a dominant language, such as Cantonese influencing English when Cantonese is the dominant language, and it will only occur in certain domains. Below are the two proposals represented in the Crosslinguistic Hypothesis where CLI may occur.

- It may occur where there is an interface. An interface, for example, could be between syntax and pragmatics of dislocations. Dislocations are a grammatical option in French under certain pragmatic conditions (e.g. Je l'aime, ça 'I like it, that'), which have been studied in French-English bilinguals positioning of the word that. French-English bilinguals make use of this device when they move that to a dislocated position of the periphery of the sentence in English. The placement of that was dislocated in English sentences because of the influence from French on English syntax. For example, French-English bilingual children may produce Is a big one this? instead of meaning to say Is this a big one? The children produced significantly more of these dislocations in English than monolingual English children.
- It may occur where is an overlap between two languages with language A allowing only one option and language B allowing two options. One option of language B overlaps with an option in language A. For example, French allows adjectives before and after a noun, but English only allows adjectives before the noun. There is an overlap in the correct placement of adjectives between these two languages, and there will be transfer, especially with postnominal adjectives in French. For example, French-English bilinguals might produce un blanc chien 'a white dog' instead of un chien blanc 'a dog white'.

Since the development of the Crosslinguistic Hypothesis, much research has contributed to the understanding of CLI in areas of structural overlap, directionality, dominance, interfaces, the role of input, and the role of processing and production.

== Transfer ==
In linguistics, language transfer is defined by behaviorist psychologists as the subconscious use of behaviors from one language in another. In the applied linguistics field, it is also known as exhibiting knowledge of a native or dominant language (L1) in one that is being learned (L2). Transfer occurs in various language-related settings, such as acquiring a new language and when two languages or two dialects come into contact. Transfer may depend on how similar the two languages are and the intensity of the conversational setting. Transfer is more likely to happen if the two languages are in the same language family. It also occurs more at the beginning stages of L2 acquisition, when the grammar and lexicon are less developed. As the speaker's L2 proficiency increases, they will experience less transfer.

Jacquelyn Schachter (1992) argues that transfer is not a process at all, but that it is improperly named. She described transfer as "an unnecessary carryover from the heyday of behaviorism." In her view, transfer is more of a constraint on the L2 learners' judgments about the constructions of the acquired L2 language. Schachter stated, "It is both a facilitating and a limiting condition on the hypothesis testing process, but it is not in and of itself a process."

Language transfer can be positive or negative. Transfer between similar languages often yields correct production in the new language because the systems of both languages are similar. This correct production would be considered positive transfer. An example involves a Spanish speaker (L1) who is acquiring Catalan (L2). Because the languages are so similar, the speaker could rely on their knowledge of Spanish when learning certain Catalan grammatical features and pronunciation. However, the two languages are distinct enough that the speaker's knowledge of Spanish could potentially interfere with learning Catalan properly.

Negative transfer (interference) occurs when there are little to no similarities between the L1 and L2. It is when errors and avoidance are more likely to occur in the L2. The types of errors that result from this type of transfer are underproduction, overproduction, miscomprehension, and production errors, such as substitution, calques, under/overdifferentiation and hypercorrection.

=== Underproduction (avoidance) ===
Underproduction as explained by Schachter (1974), is a strategy used by L2 learners to avoid producing errors when using structures, sounds, or words which they are not confident about in the L2. Avoidance is a complex phenomenon and experts do not agree on its causes or exactly what it is. For example, Hebrew speakers acquiring English, may understand how the passive voice, 'a cake is made', works, but may prefer active voice, 'I make a cake,' thus avoiding the passive construction. Kellerman (1992) distinguishes three types of avoidance: (1) learners of the L2 make anticipations or know there is a problem with their construction and have a vague idea of the target construction, (2) the target is known by the L1 speaker, but it is too difficult to use in given circumstances; such as conversational topics that the L1 speaker may have a deficiency in or (3), the L1 speaker has the knowledge to correctly produce and use the L2 structure but is unwilling to use it because it goes against the norms of their behavior.

=== Overproduction ===
Overproduction refers to an L2 learner producing certain structures within the L2 with a higher frequency than native speakers of that language. In a study by Schachter and Rutherford (1979), they found that Chinese and Japanese speakers who wrote English sentences overproduced certain types of cleft constructions:

- 'It is very unfortunate that...'

and sentences that contained There are/There is, which suggests an influence of the topic marking function in their L1 appearing in their L2 English sentences.

French learners have been shown to over-rely on presentational structures when introducing new referents into discourse, in their L2 Italian and English. This phenomenon has been observed even in the case of a target language where the presentational structure does not involve a relative pronoun, as Mandarin Chinese.

=== Production errors ===
Substitution is when the L1 speaker takes a structure or word from their native language and replaces it within the L2. Odlin (1989) shows a sentence from a Swedish learner of English in the following sentence.

- Swedish structure on English:
  - But sometimes I must go bort.

Here the Swedish word bort has replaced its English equivalent away.

- Polish learner of English:
  - English think pronounced as [fink] because of the influence of the Polish accent on English pronunciation.

A calque is a direct loan translation where words are translated from the L1 literally into the L2.

- English skyscraper literally translates in French as gratte-ciel 'scrapes-sky'
- Polish palec srodkowy literally translates to a 'finger middle' in English.
- Scottish Gaelic a' coimhead air adhart (literal translation of looking forwards), cf. native expression, Tha fiughair agam ris ('I have anticipation of it')

Overdifferentiation occurs when distinctions in the L1 are carried over to the L2.

- An English L1 learner of Polish applies different vowel lengths of English (e.g. /i/ and /i:/) to their Polish due to the use of vowel distinctions in English.

Underdifferentiation occurs when speakers are unable to make distinctions in the L2.

- A Polish learner of English assumes the words borrow and lend are equivalent in meaning, since both correspond to pożyczyć in Polish.
- Scottish Gaelic learners whose first language was English pronounce the phonemes /l̪ˠ/, /l/, and /ʎ/ identically, since English has only one lateral phoneme.

Hypercorrection is a process where the L1 speaker finds forms in the L2 they consider to be important to acquire, but these speakers do not properly understand the restrictions or exceptions to formal rules that are in the L2, which results in errors, such as the example below.

- Polish speakers of English may say potato pronounced as [pota:to] paralleling tomato [toma:to]

== Attrition ==
Also related to the idea of languages interfering with one another is the concept of language attrition. Language attrition, simply put, is language loss. Attrition can occur in an L1 or an L2. According to the Interference Hypothesis (also known as the Crosslinguistic Influence Hypothesis), language transfer could contribute to language attrition. If a speaker moves to a country where their L2 is the dominant language and the speaker ceases regular use of their L1, the speaker could experience attrition in their L1. However, second language attrition could just as easily occur if the speaker moves back to a place where their L1 is the dominant language, and the speaker does not practice their L2 frequently. Attrition could also occur if a child speaker's L1 is not the dominant language in their society. A child whose L1 is Spanish, but whose socially dominant language is English, could experience attrition of their Spanish simply because they are restricted to using that language in certain domains. Much research has been done on such speakers, who are called heritage language learners. When discussing CLI, attrition is an important concept because it is a direct result of two or more languages coming into contact and the dominance of one over the other resulting in language loss in a speaker.

== Complementarity principle ==
Grosjean (1997) explained the complementarity principle as the function of language use in certain domains of life leading to language dominance within that domain for a given speaker. This dominance in certain domains of life (e.g. school, home, work, etc.) can lead to apparent crosslinguistic influence within a domain. One study found that CLI occurred within the speech of the studied bilinguals, but the intensity of influence was subject to the domains of speech being used. Argyri and Sorace (2007) found, much like many other researchers, that language dominance plays a role in the directionality of CLI. These researchers found that the English-dominant bilinguals had an influence of English on their Greek (concerning preverbal subjects specifically, but also the language in general), but not from their Greek to their English. On the other hand, the Greek-dominant bilinguals did not show evidence of Greek influence on their English.

This supports the notion that bilinguals who do not receive sufficient exposure to both languages acquire a "weaker language" and a "dominant language," and depending on similarities or differences between the languages, effects can be present or absent like that of the Greek-English example above. The effect of CLI can be primarily seen as a unidirectional occurrence, in that the L2 is likely to be affected by the L1, or simply the dominant language is more likely to affect the weaker, than the reverse. This supports the idea of individuals' susceptibility to crosslinguistic influences and the role of dominance. One example is bilinguals who use different languages for different domains in their life; if a Spanish-English bilingual primarily uses Spanish in the home, but English in school, one would expect to see English influence while speaking about school topics in Spanish. Similarly, one would also expect Spanish influence on English when speaking about the home in English because in both instances, the language being used is weaker in that domain. CLI exists not only from one language to another, but depending on the domains of use and the degree of proficiency or dominance, it can be a significant influence on speech production.

== Additional theories ==
Some researchers believe that CLI may be a result of "contact-modified input," or linguistic input modified or affected by some other source such as another language. This is to say that the environment surrounding the learning of another language can influence what is actually being learned. One example is the fact that most L2 learners receive input or instruction from similarly speaking bilinguals; Hauser-Grüdl, Guerra, Witzmann, Leray, and Müller (2010) believe that the language being taught has already been influenced by the other in the teachers' minds and, therefore, the input the learner receives will exhibit influence. These L2 learners will replicate influences because their input of the L2 is not as pure as input from a monolingual. Thus, what appears as CLI in the individual is not in effect CLI of their L1 on their L2, but the effects of acquiring input that has already been modified. This theory has led some people to believe that all input for L2 learning will be affected and resemble CLI; however, this is not a well-supported theory of CLI or its function in L2 acquisition.

Other researchers believe that CLI is more than production influences, claiming that this linguistic exchange can impact other factors of a learner's identity. Jarvis and Pavlenko (2008) described affected areas including experiences, knowledge, cognition, development, attention and language use as being major centers for change because of CLI. These ideas suggest that crosslinguistic influence of syntactic, morphological, or phonological changes may be the surface of one language's influence on the other, and CLI is instead a different developmental use of one's brain.

== Future research ==
CLI has been heavily studied by scholars, but more research is needed because of the multitude of components that make up the phenomenon. Firstly, the typology of particular language pairings needs to be researched to differentiate CLI from the general effects of bilingualism and bilingual acquisition.

Also, research is needed in specific areas of overlap between particular language pairings and the domains that influence and discourage CLI. For example, most of the research studies involve European language combinations, and there is a significant lack of information regarding language combinations involving non-European languages, indigenous languages, and other minority languages.

More generally, an area of research to be further developed are the effects of CLI in multilingual acquisition of three or more languages. There is limited research on this occurrence.
