= Negative transfer (disambiguation) =

Negative transfer is interference of one language with learning another.

Negative transfer may also refer to:

- Negative transfer (memory), interference of an existing learned response with learning to respond to a novel, similar stimulus
- Internegative, a photographic negative used in motion picture duplication
- Motion picture film scanner, scanning of a motion picture negative to transfer it to a digital video editing system
- Telecine, a motion picture film scanner that operates in real time
- Film-out, transfer of video to a film negative
