= Sequential bilingualism =

Bilingualism by learning a second language after a first

Sequential bilingualism occurs when a person becomes bilingual by first learning one language and then another. The process is contrasted with simultaneous bilingualism, in which both languages are learned at the same time.

There is variation in the period in which learning must take place for bilingualism to be considered simultaneous. Generally, the term sequential bilingualism applies only if the child is approximately three years old before being introduced to the second language (L2).

== Sequential bilingual acquisition ==
In contrast to simultaneous bilingualism which occurs within the first year of life, the sequential acquisition of a second language can occur at any age. As the dominant language of bilingual speakers is often the native language or the language used with a higher frequency, the language which is acquired later in life is often weaker. Although this is frequently the case, there are some situations where the language acquired later in life through sequential bilingual acquisition can actually become the speaker's dominant language, whether that be because of language attrition or other external causes. Second language competence depends on a wide variety of factors, including the mode in which sequential language acquisition takes place and the age at which the second language is acquired.

=== Modes of acquisition ===
==== Circumstantial bilingualism vs elective bilingualism ====
Elective bilingualism means that L2 is acquired through voluntary language learning, such as choosing to take foreign language classes. Although these people continue to live in an environment where their first language is the dominant language, they are choosing to add another language to their linguistic abilities.

Circumstantial bilinguals, on the other hand, are those who are forced to learn a second language due to their social, geographical, or political situations. For example, immigrants who relocate to a new country may learn the new language in order to communicate with their new community. For circumstantial bilinguals, child learners will enter a "functional" stage of learning the language after about two years of being in a new country. This means that they will be fluent or almost fluent, and have the necessary written and oral language skills to function in all aspects of life. Adult learners will most likely not enter the functional stage until they have been in the new country for 10 years.

==== Formal vs informal learning ====
Sequential language acquisition for L2 learners can occur in formal or informal settings. Formal language learning typically takes place in a classroom environment, where teaching of a second language is highly structured with a clear purpose. For example, when a Russian student takes a course of Arabic in school, the student is undergoing formal lessons to acquire the second language. Informal language learning on the other hand can take place in a variety of settings outside of a classroom, including in the home, through media, or at work or school. The main characteristic that defines informal language learning is that it involves unstructured acquisition and it mostly occurs through daily social interactions. An example of this type of language learning in more naturalistic contexts could be that when a native Japanese speaking child is living in the United States, the child will informally learn English through interaction and attending class with English-speaking citizens. Sequential language acquisition can also occur with a combination of informal and formal learning. This would occur if, for example, a native Japanese-speaking child moved to the United States and started to learn English; the child could experience informal English language learning through social interactions with their peers and formal language learning if they were enrolled in an ESL class with formal, school-based instruction.

== Achieving linguistic competence with sequential bilingualism ==
=== Achieving the competence of a native speaker ===
Linguistic competence for sequential bilingual speakers can be influenced by factors such as age of acquisition, age of arrival and length of residence, and a number of other cognitive and environmental variables. Most linguists agree that linguistic competence comparable to a native speaker can be achieved when the second language is learned before the critical period of acquiring a language ends. It is more difficult to achieve a native-like competence when the language is learned at a later time in life. In terms of phonological competence, some studies have used measures of accentedness where subjects are rated on a scale from "native speaker" to "strong foreign accent."

=== Dominant versus balanced bilinguals ===
There are two types of bilinguals: the dominant and balanced bilinguals. Dominant bilinguals are bilinguals who are more proficient in one language than the other. Balanced bilinguals are people who have equal proficiency in both their first language (L1) and L2. However, balanced bilinguals are not common, as people rarely use two languages in the same situation.

=== Grammatical versus communicative competence ===
Grammatical competence refers to the ability to correctly combine grammatical elements of a language. Communicative competence, on the other hand, considers both grammatical competence and the social-psychological determinants of language used by native speakers.

Communicative competence refers to knowing when saying something is appropriate or not in a culture. It also includes knowing how to interpret an intended message in an utterance with more than one possible meaning difference. For example, knowing that when you are asked "Can you open the door?" it means that someone is requesting you to open the door and not enquiring whether you are able to open the door.

With formal teaching of a second language the focus tends to be on grammatical competence that is comparable to native speakers, often leaving limited communicative competence for sequential language learners. Communicative competence could be enhanced with increased use of the second language or immersion in the second language.

=== Interactional competence ===
In first language acquisition children implicitly learn how their linguistic actions relate to the reactions of others. Similarly, sequential L2 learners have knowledge of basic interactional capabilities when they're starting to learn a second language. L2 speakers must draw on their basic interactional competence (BIC) in order to interact with native speakers.

BIC, which is what nonnative speakers start with, is contrasted with applied interactional competence (AIC), which L2 learners eventually acquire after living in a host country and learning the host culture. Additionally, recent research points to the potential of social VR to support the development of AIC in L2 speakers who do not have the opportunity to live abroad.

== Majority vs minority language ==
=== First language as a majority language ===
The acquisition of a foreign language that is not commonly spoken in one's own community is dependent on one's motivation and determination (provided that there are the means and opportunity for the acquisition), since it is not a useful or essential medium of communication in one's own society.

=== First language as a minority language ===
A Minority language of a region is a language spoken only by a minority in a population. For example, a Chinese, bilingual child living in the United States with their first language being Chinese and American English as the major regional language.

Minority languages may be at risk of being lost, depending on the following factors:

==== Age of introduction of L2 ====
Several studies show that immigrant children who arrive in the country early eventually switch their primary and dominant language from L1 to L2, while children who arrive later in childhood keep their L1 as their primary, strong and dominant language. So the retention of the minority language is dependent on the age of acquisition of the majority language. This is because, the older the child is when introduced to L2, the more exposure to and knowledge of use of L1 the child has, and hence less tendency to lose his ability to use native languages, since the minority language will still be their primary and dominant language of use.

==== Value and importance of minority language in society ====
Especially in societies like the United States, where multilingualism and ethnic diversity are not particularly valued, language-minority children encounter powerful forces for language shift or assimilation when they enter the majority-speaking world of the classroom. Young children are extremely vulnerable to the social pressures exerted by people in their social worlds. But the social pressure they experience is not entirely external. Internal pressure also plays a part. Once they turn on the television and hear a new language, they understand that their own language is different, and possibly they also differ in appearance and in behavior; and they come to regard these differences as undesirable. At the same time, they are motivated to stop using their L1, all too often long before they have mastered the second language, all due to the internal and external pressures from their environment.

Furthermore, the rank of the minority language in the family, language profile of the parents, opportunity to interact with L1 peers and the importance of the language to a person will also play a part in whether the minority language will be lost.

==== Consequences of first language attrition (FLA) ====
The term 'First Language Attrition' (FLA) refers to the gradual decline in native language proficiency among migrants. As a speaker uses their L2 frequently and becomes proficient (or even dominant) in it, some aspects of the L1 can become subject to L2 influence or deteriorate.

For children in language-minority communities, maintaining their ancestral language preserves ties to their grandparents and keeps open the option of experiences that build ethnic identification and pride, as well as cultural continuity. Parents cannot easily convey to them their values, beliefs, understandings, or wisdom, and about how to cope with their experiences. They cannot teach their children about the meaning of work, or about personal responsibility or what it means to be a moral or ethical person in a world with too many choices and too few guideposts to follow. What is lost are the bits of advice parents should be able to offer children in their everyday interactions with them. Talk is a crucial link between parents and children. It is how parents impart their culture to their children and enable them to become the kind of men and women they want them to be. When parents lose their means for socializing and influencing their children, rifts develop and families lose the intimacy that comes from shared beliefs and understandings.

During language attrition, individuals will give up their cultural identity and take on the beliefs, attitudes, and behaviors of the majority culture. Individuals integrate when they continue to hold on their cultural identity, but also become integral members of the majority culture. When they desire to hold on to their cultural identity, there will be separation from society; the individual will withdraw from the majority culture. Languages contribute to sum of human knowledge. Inside each language, there is a vision of the past, present and future. When a language dies, so too die culture, identity and knowledge that have been transmitted from generation to generation through that language.

== Factors affecting L2 acquisition ==
=== Individual factors ===
Biological factors of an individual can affect their own L2 acquisition. Underdevelopment of any of the biological systems, or damage or disruptions to the systems can and will impede the acquisition process of a language, be it L1 or L2. These systems include the cognitive, sensory, social, emotional, and neurobiological systems. These systems not only play a critical independent role on language acquisition, they also interact with each other to contribute to the person's ability towards language learning.

==== Affective factors ====
The learner's emotional state or affect can interfere with acquiring a new language because acquiring a new language inevitably involves practicing it in public and conversing with others. All these encompassed the possibility of making mistakes, resulting in embarrassment, and such anxiety can block the ability to receive and process new information. Thus, high self-consciousness and a reluctance to reveal their weaknesses and faults, coupled with feelings of vulnerability could greatly impede second language learning. Fear of embarrassment has been found to occur more in adults than children because adults are more self-conscious about speaking, making errors and are more easily demoralized by pronunciation difficulties.

==== Age of onset ====
Linguists generally agree that age of onset has an effect on L2 proficiency and performance, as children who are exposed to a second language earlier tend to fare better on performance tests later in life. Additionally, the notion of the Critical Period Hypothesis in the context of language acquisition suggests that there is a sensitive time period in early childhood during which L2 can be learned easily and quickly. While it may vary in individual children, this window of opportunity is considered to be between the ages of 2 and puberty.

However, there is contention on whether the critical period for language truly exists. Although there is generally a negative correlation between age of acquisition and L2 proficiency, studies which do not find a period of "onset" or "sharp decline" in sensitivity for language acquisition suggest that the critical period is poorly defined. Speakers who are exposed to L2 after puberty or in early adulthood are still capable of reaching nativelike fluency, showing a pattern of learning that is inconsistent with Lenneberg's original model.

==== Motivation ====
L2 acquisition is affected by one's motivation to learn and use/communicate with that language Motivation is determined by the interaction between environmental needs and opportunities as well as personal preferences, which is dependent on social contexts.

There are generally two types of motivation: Integrative Motivation and Instrumental Motivation. It is assumed that language acquisition is most successful when one learns a language because one truly liked the language and culture and possessed a desire to integrate into the culture in which the language is used. This form of motivation is known as integrative (or intrinsic) motivation. Developing a certain level of proficiency in the language becomes necessary because the community which one wants to immerse oneself into uses the target language in its social interactions. Thus, in order to operate socially in the community and become one of its members, one has to be sufficiently proficient in that target language. In contrast, Instrumental (or extrinsic) motivation is the opposite. People who are instrumentally motivated to learn a language acquires that language because they want to benefit from that language, like gaining something practical or concrete. There is a practical purpose for acquiring an L2, such as meeting the requirements for school or university graduation, applying for a job, requesting higher pay based on language ability, or even achieving higher social status. Here, there is little or no desire for social integration of the learner into a community.

While both integrative and instrumental motivation are essential elements of successful language acquisition, research have determined integrative motivation as the main element in long-term success sustenance when learning a second language.

For communication purposes, which language a bilingual chooses to speak, motive may interact with both the listener's identity and the environmental context—one language may be preferred to communicate with a parent or child, another to complete a business transaction. The social status or prestige associated with a language could also motivate one to use that specific language. For example, United States being a political and economic powerhouse, the motivation to learn and acquire English is huge. Young immigrants in this country are spurred to learn English as fast as possible, mostly within a single generation, and many third-generation immigrants speak only English, with little or no ability in the language of their grandparents.

==== L1 interference ====
L1 interference in bilingual language acquisition generally refers to the influence that the learner's L1 exerts over the acquisition of an L2. Habits have been formed during L1 acquisition will influence the L2 learning process, either facilitate or hinder L2 learning. The more similar L1 is with L2, the greater ease learners have with learning the L2 structures. In contrast, areas where L1 and L2 differ, the learners face much difficulty in learning because learners would use their L1 knowledge and experience to guide their L2 learning and responses.

==== Emotional intensity ====
Various studies have found that for bilinguals, the emotional intensity of L1 is different from the emotional intensity of subsequent languages learned. These studies concluded that L1 has the highest emotional impact and is the language of personal involvement while L2 is the language that can create distance and detachment as it has lesser emotional impact as compared to L1.

Yet, paradoxically, many late bilinguals indicate that it is harder for them to swear in their L1 as compared to their L2. As such they would prefer to use their L2 to swear despite it having lesser emotional impact on the speakers themselves. This could be due to the fact that they are unable to feel the total strength of their spoken words when swearing in their L2 and as such, they would swear in their L2 more easily.

=== Social factors ===
==== Availability of opportunities ====
Here, opportunities are social factors that lead to the availability of situations for the use of the acquired L2. Increased chances to use a language greatly improve one's ability in that language. For example, the environment must first present access to that language. Then, there must be a need for using the language as a form of communication, which will thus force and motivate the learner to consistently speak in that language. In addition, opportunities for language use should come in diverse forms, like spoken or written, and in various contexts, like in school, at home or during peer interaction, so that the child would learn how to adapt to and apply the language appropriately in different situations, using mediums, with different people.

Parents are crucial here because they are essentially the key provider of a child's L2 learning opportunities. They are the ones who choose the type of L2 and enroll the child in L2 learning classes. Additionally, when the parent takes on the active role, whereby they actively and consciously monitor the child and encourage the child to learn the language, and provide chances for the use and practice of the L2 in different contexts with different people, these will generally reinforce the child's successes too.

==== Familial and cultural factors ====
Parental and family support are important because they are the key providers to the child's L2 learning and acquisition opportunities. They provide access to L2 learning and also to the use of the language, not only because they interact with the child the most often and therefore are the people whom the child can most often practice and use the L2 they learned, parents can also determine who the child interacts with and thus determine their opportunities for L2 use outside the family context.

However, as there is the risk that the child would lose competence in their native language, which is especially so if the L2 is considered to be of a higher prestige than the native language and is more useful and beneficial to the speaker in more contexts than the other, parents might disapprove L2 acquisition because they see their native language as a form of identity and their heritage and do not want their child to lose it. Furthermore, if the parent holds negative attitudes towards the L2, they might transfer these negative attitudes to the child, and thus reducing the child's motivation to learn the language.

Also, low socioeconomic status is another obstacle because even if the family supports L2 learning, they might not have sufficient income to provide the adequate resources and help required for learning an L2. Parents are financially incapable of enrolling their children in language classes, neither are they able to afford textbooks, reading and practice materials for their children to learn and practice. All these are possible factors acting as L2 acquisition barriers.

=== Pedagogical factors ===
Second language acquisition can be attained in both naturalistic settings and classroom settings. Compared to naturalistic settings, classroom settings enable second language learners to focus on linguistic forms and metalinguistic knowledge. At present, for bilinguals, second language acquisition happens mostly in classroom settings.

==== Does formal instruction aid the rate and path of SLA? ====
Based on our own language learning experience, we intuitively believe that formal instruction helps bilinguals develop higher level of language literacy and proficiency. However, various studies, including cross-sectional and longitudinal studies, prove that formal instruction makes no difference to the path of SLA and rules of language are acquired in a predictable order. The order of formal instruction on morphemes is not correlated with the natural order of acquisition. It is pointed out by longitudinal studies that the deviation away from natural order is temporary. And informal instruction shows its interference only in test-like situations, but not in communicative contexts.

The impact of formal instruction on rate of SLA is controversial. Though learners adopting formal instruction have better performance on discrete-point tests, no evidence backs the absolute positive effect of formal instruction. The methodological problem confronted by the studies supporting informal instruction is to determine whether the instruction itself (grammar teaching) or more contact brought by classroom settings leads to learning acceleration. For this, Krashen proposes that "learned" knowledge obtained through explicit learning is distinct from "acquired" knowledge gained through implicit learning, and knowledge gained by one route cannot be converted into the other type of knowledge. Formal instruction only increases learners’ learned knowledge, but makes no contribution to acquisition. However, teachers’ input and interaction, which indirectly offers comprehensible input, is of real value. The interaction in the classroom settings also facilitates acquisition by exposing students to language in a communicative context.

==== How does formal instruction affect SLA? ====
Based on the argument above, we know that the efficiency of second language acquisition is based on whether the classroom is an acquisition-rich or acquisition-poor environment. Newmark (cited in Ellis, 1994) pointed out that instructors of foreign language classes should stop interfering with the learning process and propose that classroom instruction would be successful if the environment is naturalistic. However, classroom settings and naturalistic settings inevitably differ in the following aspects, which may or may not be helpful for second language acquisition.

===== Input =====
The classroom environment offers input that is adjusted to learners’ needs. Instructors can decrease their speaking rate and simplify their word use and sentence structures. According to the input hypothesis by Krashen, one can acquire a second language efficiently with comprehensible input, which suggests that input brought by formal instruction may directly or indirectly contribute to SLA.

===== Interaction =====
Technically, interactional modification helps boost second language acquisition by making input more comprehensible. According to Interaction Hypothesis, interaction facilitates meaning negotiation via clarification, confirmation, repetition and comprehension checks, etc. Interactions between teachers and students would also bridge support, which weakens learners’ affective filter and may result in better learning.

===== Teachers' questions =====
Teachers' questions push learners to interact and simulate real communication in an artificial context. Feedback from students’ performance enables instructors to control the progress and adjust following instructions. In addition, referential questions, compared to display questions, provide students with more opportunities to produce extensive output and boost their acquisition.

===== Topic control =====
Based on empirical teaching and learning experience, topics chosen by learners rather than teachers would motivate learners better and further spark extensive production. Secondly, topic selection ensures that the complexity of the input is under control and is adapted to learners’ language competence.

==== Implications for classroom teaching ====
As Corder (1976, cited in Ellis, 1992) proposed, “Efficient foreign language teaching must work with rather than against natural process, facilitate rather than impede learning. Teachers and teaching materials must adapt to the learner rather than vice-versa.”

Ellis proposes several general suggestions to offer an acquisition-rich communicative environment.

- Teachers’ talk needs to be simplified to generate more comprehensible input for learners.
- Interactions are encouraged. During this process, learners gain opportunities to construct and observe their discourse.
- Learners are encouraged to output extensive responses.
- Learners can choose their topics.
- Second language use is not restricted to classroom settings.

== See also ==
- Simultaneous bilingualism
- Multilingualism
- Monolingualism
- Language acquisition
- Second-language acquisition
