= Stephen Matthews (linguist) =

British linguist in Hong Kong

Stephen Matthews (Chinese: 馬詩帆) is a British linguist in Hong Kong. He is Emeritus Professor at the University of Hong Kong and Co-Director of the Childhood Bilingualism Research Centre at the Chinese University of Hong Kong. His specialist areas include language typology, syntax and semantics. His research interests include the word order typology of Chinese; the grammar of Chinese languages, notably Cantonese, Chaozhou and other Minnan dialects; language contact and bilingualism, with particular reference to Sinitic languages.

== Career ==
Matthews received his BA in Modern and Medieval Languages from the University of Cambridge, and his PhD in Linguistics from the University of Southern California.

In the 1990s, Matthews began teaching at University of Hong Kong. He has also taught at the University of Melbourne and University of Paris.

His published works often focus on Sinitic languages, including Cantonese and bilingualism in Hong Kong.

=== The Hong Kong Bilingual Child Language Corpus ===
The Hong Kong Bilingual Child Language Corpus, which is reported in 2005 as the world's largest video-linked database of children becoming bilingual, created by Matthews and Yip, features 170 hours of audio and video files of four families raising their children bilingually in Cantonese and English. The project, which includes transcripts and searchable video and audio segments, took 10 years to compile. This database is the basis of a book, The Bilingual Child, written by Yip and Matthews and published by Cambridge University Press in 2007, which received the Leonard Bloomfield Book Award from the Linguistic Society of America in 2009. The database focuses on children who are bilingual in English and Cantonese and who learned to speak two languages through the one-parent, one-language approach.

== Personal life ==
Matthews is married to linguist Virginia Yip, and has three bilingual children. An amateur musician, he has played second violin with the Hong Kong Chamber Orchestra and the SAR Philharmonic. He is an academic signatory to the Declaration of Reasonable Doubt concerning the Shakespeare Authorship Question.

== Research ==
- A Cantonese-English bilingual child language corpus

== Books and publications ==
- Matthews, S. & V. Yip. 1994. Cantonese: A Comprehensive Grammar. London: Routledge. Second edition, 2011. (on-line review by Marjorie Chan); Japanese edition by E. Chishima and S. Kataoka, Tokyo: Toho Shoten, 2000.
- Comrie, B., S. Matthews and M. Polinsky (consulting editors).1996. The Atlas of Languages. New York: Facts on File, and London: Bloomsbury
  - Dutch version edited by Jeroen Wiedenhof: De grote taalatlas. Amsterdam: De Schuyt & Co., 1998;
  - Japanese version edited by Fusa Katada: Sekai gengo bunka zukan: sekai no gengo no kigen to denpa. Tokyo: Tooyoo Shorin, 1999;
  - Revised English edition: New York: Facts on File, 2003;
  - French version based on revised edition: Atlas des langues, Editions Acropole, Paris, 2004
- Matthews, S. (ed), 1998. Studies in Cantonese Linguistics. Linguistic Society of Hong Kong.
- Yip, V. & S. Matthews, 2000. Basic Cantonese: a Grammar and Workbook. London: Routledge.
- Yip, V. & S. Matthews, 2001. Intermediate Cantonese: a Grammar and Workbook. London: Routledge. (on-line review by Blaine Erickson)
- Yip, V. & S. Matthews. 2007. The Bilingual Child: early development and language contact. Cambridge University Press.
