= Language attrition =

Process of losing a language

Language attrition is the process of decreasing proficiency in or losing a language. For first or native language attrition, this process is generally caused by both isolation from speakers of the first language ("L1") and the acquisition and use of a second language ("L2"), which interferes with the correct production and comprehension of the first. Such interference from a second language is likely experienced to some extent by all bilinguals, but is most evident among speakers for whom a language other than their first has started to play an important, if not dominant, role in everyday life; these speakers are more likely to experience language attrition. It is common among immigrants that travel to countries where languages foreign to them are used. Second language attrition can occur from poor learning, practice, and retention of the language after time has passed from learning. This often occurs with bilingual speakers who do not frequently engage with their L2.

Several factors affect language attrition. Frequent exposure and use of a particular language is often assumed adequate to maintain the native language system intact. However, research has often failed to confirm this prediction. A person's age can predict the likelihood of attrition; children are demonstrably more likely to lose their first language than adults. The process of learning a language and the methods used to teach it can also affect attrition. A positive attitude towards the potentially attriting language or its speech community and motivation to retain the language are other factors which may reduce attrition. These factors are too difficult to confirm by research.

These factors are similar to those that affect second-language acquisition and the two processes are sometimes compared. However, the overall impact of these factors is far less than that for second language acquisition.

Language attrition results in a decrease of language proficiency. The current consensus is that it manifests itself first and most noticeably in speakers' vocabulary (in their lexical access and their mental lexicon), while grammatical and especially phonological representations appear more stable among speakers who emigrated after puberty.

== Study ==
The study of language attrition became a subfield of linguistics with a 1980 conference at the University of Pennsylvania called "Loss of Language Skills". The aim of the conference was to discuss areas of second language attrition and to discuss ideas for possible future research. The conference revealed that attrition is a wide topic, with numerous factors and taking many forms.

Decades later, the field of first language attrition gained new momentum with two conferences held in Amsterdam in 2002 and 2005, as well as a series of graduate workshops and panels at international conferences, such as the International Symposium on Bilingualism (2007, 2009), the annual conferences of the European Second Language Association, and the AILA World Congress (2008). The outcomes of some of these meetings were later published in edited volumes. The term first language attrition (FLA) refers to the gradual decline in native language proficiency. As speakers use their L2 frequently and become proficient (or even dominant) in it, some aspects of the L1 can deteriorate or become subject to L2 influence.

Research on L2 attrition is lacking, as most research focused on L1 attrition. Only during the 1970s and early 1980s did research on L2 attrition and memory start to appear. However, there are many overlaps between L1 attrition and L2 attrition.

To study the process of language attrition, researchers initially looked at neighboring areas of linguistics to identify which parts of the L1 system attrite first; lacking years of direct experimental data, linguists studied language contact, creolization, L2 acquisition, and aphasia, and applied their findings to language acquisition. Language loss caused by aging, brain injuries, or neurological disorders is not considered part of language attrition.

One issue that is faced when researching attrition is distinguishing between normal L2 influence on the L1 and actual attrition of the L1. Since all bilinguals experience some degree of cross linguistic influence, where the L2 interferes with the retrieval of the speaker's L1, it is difficult to determine if delays and/or mistakes in the L1 are due to attrition or caused by CLI. Also, simultaneous bilinguals may not have a language that is indistinguishable from that of a native speaker or a language where their knowledge of it is less extensive than a native speaker's; therefore testing for attrition is difficult.

=== Types of attrition ===
==== L1 attrition ====
L1 attrition is the partial or complete loss of one's first, often native, language. This can often result from immigration to an L2-dominant region, daily activities in L2-dominant environments, or motivational factors.

==== L2 attrition ====
L2 attrition is the loss of one's second language, which can result from cross-interference from L1 or even from an additional third learned language ("L3"). Unlike L1 learning and attrition, L2 learning and attrition is not a linear phenomenon and can begin in multiple ways: vocabulary loss, weakened syntax, simpler phonetic rules, etc.

In Hansen and Reetz-Kurashige (1999), Hansen cites her own research on L2-Hindi and Urdu attrition in young children. As young pre-school children in India and Pakistan, the subjects of her study were often judged to be native speakers of Hindi or Urdu; their mother was far less proficient. On return visits to their home country, the United States, both children appeared to lose all their L2 while the mother noticed no decline in her own L2 abilities. Twenty years later, those same young children as adults comprehend not a word from recordings of their own animated conversations in Hindi-Urdu; the mother still understands much of them.

Yamamoto (2001) found a link between age and bilinguality. In fact, a number of factors are at play in bilingual families. In her study, bicultural families that maintained only one language, the minority language, in the household, were able to raise bilingual, bicultural children without fail. Families that adopted the one parent – one language policy were able to raise bilingual children at first but when the children joined the dominant language school system, there was a 50% chance that children would lose their minority language abilities. In families that had more than one child, the older child was most likely to retain two languages, if it was at all possible. Younger siblings in families with more than two other brothers and sisters had little chance of maintaining or ever becoming bilingual.

== Manifestations ==
=== Lexical attrition ===
The first linguistic system to be affected by first language attrition is the lexicon. The lexical-semantic relationship usually starts to deteriorate first and most quickly, driven by Cross Linguistic Interference (CLI) from the speaker's L2, and it is believed to be exacerbated by continued exposure to, and frequent use of, the L2. Evidence for such interlanguage effects can be seen in a study by Pavlenko (2003, 2004) which shows that there was some semantic extension from the L2, which was English, into the L1 Russian speakers' lexicons. In order to test for lexical attrition, researchers used tests such as picture naming tasks, where they place a picture of an item in front of the participant and ask them to name it, or by measuring lexical diversity in the speaker's spontaneous speech (speech that is unprompted and improvised). In both cases, attriters performed worse than non-attriters. One hypothesis suggests that when a speaker tries to access a lexical item from their L1 they are also competing with the translation equivalents of their L2 and that there is either a problem with activating the L1 due to infrequent use or with the inhibition of the competing L2.

=== Grammatical attrition ===
Grammatical attrition can be defined as "the disintegration of the structure of a first language (L1) in contact situations with a second language (L2)". In a study of bilingual Swedes raised outside of Sweden who, in their late twenties, returned to their home country for schooling, the participants demonstrated both language attrition and a complete retention of the underlying syntactic structure of their L1. Notably, they exhibited the V2, verb second, word order present in most Germanic languages, except English. This rule requires the tense-marked verb of a main clause to occur in the second position of the sentence, even if that means it comes before the subject (e.g. there is an adverb at the beginning of the sentence). These speakers' ability to form sentences with V2 word order was compared against L2 learners who often overproduce the rigid SVO word order rather than applying the V2 rule. Although the study did not show evidence for attrition of syntax of the person's L1, there was evidence for attrition in the expatriates' morphology, especially in terms of agreement. They found that the bilinguals would choose to use the unmarked morphemes in place of the marked one when having to differentiate between gender and plurality; also they tend to overgeneralize where certain morphemes can be used. For example, they may use the suffix /-a/, which is used to express an indefinite plural, and overextend this morpheme to also represent the indefinite singular. There is little evidence to support the view that there is a complete restructuring of the language systems. That is, even under language attrition the syntax is largely unaffected and any variability observed is thought to be due to interference from another language, rather than attrition.

L1 attriters, like L2 learners, may use language differently from native speakers. In particular, they can have variability on certain rules which native speakers apply deterministically. In the context of attrition, however, there is strong evidence that this optionality is not indicative of any underlying representational deficits: the same individuals do not appear to encounter recurring problems with the same kinds of grammatical phenomena in different speech situations or on different tasks. This suggests that problems of L1 attriters are due to momentary conflicts between the two linguistic systems and not indicative of a structural change to underlying linguistic knowledge (that is, to an emerging representational deficit of any kind). This assumption is in line with a range of investigations of L1 attrition which argue that this process may affect interface phenomena (e.g. the distribution of overt and null subjects in pro-drop languages) but will not touch the narrow syntax.

=== Phonological attrition ===
Phonological attrition is a form of language loss that affects the speaker's ability to produce their native language with their native accent. A study of five native speakers of American English who moved to Brazil and learned Portuguese as their L2 demonstrates the possibility that one could lose one's L1 accent in place of an accent that is directly influenced by the L2. It is thought that phonological loss can occur to those who are closer to native-like fluency in the L2, especially in terms of phonological production, and for those who have immersed themselves and built a connection to the culture of the country for the L2. A sociolinguistic approach to this phenomenon is that the acquisition of a native-like L2 accent and the subsequent loss of one's native accent is influenced by the societal norms of the country and the speakers' attempt to adapt in order to feel a part of the culture they are trying to assimilate into. This type of attrition is not to be confused with contact-induced change since that would mean speech production changes due to an increased use of another language and not due to the less frequent use of the L1.

== Studies and hypotheses ==
Lambert and Moore attempted to define numerous hypotheses regarding the nature of language loss, crossed with various aspects of language. They envisioned a test to be given to American State Department employees that would include four linguistic categories (syntax, morphology, lexicon, and phonology) and three skill areas (reading, listening, and speaking). A translation component would feature on a sub-section of each skill area tested. The test was to include linguistic features that are the most difficult, according to teachers, for students to master. Such a test may confound testing what was not acquired with what was lost. Lambert, in personal communication with Köpke and Schmid, described the results as 'not substantial enough to help much in the development of the new field of language skill attrition'.

The use of translation tests to study language loss is inappropriate for a number of reasons: it is questionable what such tests measure; too much variation; the difference between attriters and bilinguals is complex; activating two languages at once may cause interference. Yoshitomi attempted to define a model of language attrition that was related to neurological and psychological aspects of language learning and unlearning. She discussed four possible hypotheses and five key aspects related to acquisition and attrition. The hypotheses are:

1. Reverse order: last learned, first forgotten. Studies by Russell and Hayashi both looked at the Japanese negation system and both found that attrition was the reverse order of acquisition. Yoshitomi and others, including Yukawa, argue that attrition can occur so rapidly, it is impossible to determine the order of loss.
2. Inverse relation: better learned, better retained. Language items that are acquired first also happen to be those that are most reinforced. As a result, hypotheses 1 and 2 capture the main linguistic characteristics of language attrition
3. Critical period: at or around age 9. As a child grows, he becomes less able to master native-like abilities. Furthermore, various linguistic features (for example phonology or syntax) may have different stages or age limits for mastering. Hyltenstam and Abrahamsson argue that after childhood, in general, it becomes more and more difficult to acquire "native-like-ness", but that there is no cut-off point in particular. Furthermore, they discuss a number of cases where a native-like L2 was acquired during adulthood.
4. Affect: motivation and attitude.

According to Yoshitomi, the five key aspects related to attrition are neuroplasticity, consolidation, permastore/savings, decreased accessibility, and receptive versus productive abilities.

=== Critical period hypothesis ===
Given that exposure to an L2 at a younger age typically leads to stronger attrition of the L1 than L2 exposure at later ages, there may be a relationship between language attrition and the critical period hypothesis. The critical period for language claims that there is an optimal time period for humans to acquire language, and after this time language acquisition is more difficult (though not impossible). Language attrition also seems to have a time period; before around age 12, a first language is most susceptible to attrition if there is reduced exposure to that language. Research shows that the complete attrition of a language would occur before the critical period ends.

All available evidence on the age effect for L1 attrition, therefore, indicates that the development of susceptibility displays a curved, not a linear, function. This suggests that in native language learning there is indeed a critical period effect, and that full development of native language capacities necessitates exposure to L1 input for the entire duration of this CP.

=== Regression hypothesis ===
The regression hypothesis, first formulated by Roman Jakobson in 1941 and originally formulated on the phonology of only Slavic languages, goes back to the beginnings of psychology and psychoanalysis. It states that which was learned first will be retained last, both in 'normal' processes of forgetting and in pathological conditions such as aphasia or dementia. As a template for language attrition, the regression hypothesis has long seemed an attractive paradigm. However, regression is not in itself a theoretical or explanatory framework. Both order of acquisition and order of attrition need to be put into the larger context of linguistic theory in order to gain explanatory adequacy.

Keijzer (2007) conducted a study on the attrition of Dutch in Anglophone Canada. She finds some evidence that later-learned rules, such as diminutive and plural formation, indeed erode before earlier learned grammatical rules. However, there is also considerable interaction between the first and second language and so a straightforward 'regression pattern' cannot be observed. Also, parallels in noun and verb phrase morphology could be present because of the nature of the tests or because of avoidance by the participants. In a follow-up 2010 article, Keijzer suggests that the regression hypothesis may be more applicable to morphology than to syntax.

Citing the studies on the regression hypothesis that have been done, Yukawa says that the results have been contradictory. It is possible that attrition is a case-by-case situation depending on a number of variables (age, proficiency, and literacy, the similarities between the L1 and L2, and whether the L1 or the L2 is attriting).

=== Threshold hypothesis ===
The threshold hypothesis, created by Jim Cummins in 1979 and expanded on since then, claims that there are language fluency thresholds that one must reach in both one's L1 and L2 in order for bilingualism to function properly and be beneficial to the individual. In order for one to maintain a low threshold, regular vocabulary and grammar usage is needed. Otherwise, an L2 that has fallen into disuse will now have a higher threshold for each language item, requiring a higher number of neural impulses to activate that item's representation in one's brain. Items that are used regularly have a lower required number of neural impulses to trigger its representation in the brain, making that language more stable and less susceptible to attrition.

Under this hypothesis, language attrition is believed to first affect lexical words and then grammar rules, rather than grammar rules eroding first like in the regression hypothesis. It also requires a higher activation threshold to recall a word rather than recognize it, which does not indicate fluency.

== Factors ==
=== Age effect ===
Children are more susceptible to (first) language attrition than adults. Research shows an age effect around the ages of 8 through 13. Before this time period, a first language can attrite under certain circumstances, the most prominent being a sudden decline in exposure to the first language. Various case studies show that children who emigrate before puberty and have little to no exposure to their first language end up losing the first language. In 2009, a study compared two groups of Swedish-speaking groups: native Swedish speakers and Korean international adoptees who were at risk of losing their Korean. Of the Korean adoptees, those who were adopted the earliest essentially lost their Korean and those adopted later still retained some of it, although it was primarily their comprehension of Korean that was spared. A 2007 study looked at Korean adoptees in France and found that they performed on par with native French speakers in French proficiency and Korean.

Attrition of a first language does not guarantee an advantage in learning a second language. Attriters are outperformed by native speakers of the second language in proficiency. A 2009 study tested the Swedish proficiency of Swedish speakers who had attrited knowledge of Spanish. These participants did show almost but not quite native-like proficiency when compared to native Swedish speakers, and they did not show an advantage when compared with bilingual Swedish-Spanish speakers.

On the other hand, L1 attrition may also occur if the overall effort to maintain the first language is insufficient while exposed to a dominant L2 environment. Another recent investigation, focusing on the development of language in late bilinguals (i.e. adults past puberty), has claimed that maintenance of the mother tongue in an L1 environment requires little to no maintenance for individuals, whereas those in the L2 environment have an additive requirement for the maintenance of the L1 and the development of the L2 (Opitz, 2013).

There have been cases in which adults have undergone first language attrition. A 2011 study tested adult monolingual English speakers, adult monolingual Russian speakers and adult bilingual English-Russian speakers on naming various liquid containers (cup, glass, mug, etc.) in both English and Russian. The results showed that the bilinguals had attrited Russian vocabulary because they did not label these liquid containers the same way as the monolingual Russian speakers. When grouped according to Age of Acquisition (AoA) of English, the bilinguals showed an effect of AoA (or perhaps the length of exposure to the L2) in that bilinguals with earlier AoA (mean AoA 3.4 years) exhibited much stronger attrition than bilinguals with later AoA (mean AoA 22.8 years). That is, the individuals with earlier AoA were the more different from monolingual Russian speakers in their labeling and categorization of drinking vessels, than the people with later AoA. However, even the late AoA bilinguals exhibited some degree of attrition in that they labeled the drinking vessels differently from native monolingual Russian-speaking adults.

=== Age of arrival ===
There are few principled and systematic investigations of FLA specifically investigating the impact of the age of arrival (AoA). However, converging evidence suggests an age effect on FLA which is much stronger and more clearly delineated than the effects that have been found in SLA research. Two studies that consider prepuberty and postpuberty migrants (Ammerlaan, 1996, AoA 0–29 yrs; Pelc, 2001, AoA 8–32 years) find that AoA is one of the most important predictors of ultimate proficiency, and a number of studies that investigate the impact of age among postpuberty migrants fail to find any effect at all (Köpke, 1999, AoA 14–36 yrs; Schmid, 2002, AoA 12–29 yrs; Schmid, 2007, AoA 17–51 yrs). A range of studies conducted by Montrul on Spanish heritage speakers in the US as well as Spanish-English bilinguals with varying levels of AoA also suggests that the L1 system of early bilinguals may be similar to that of L2 speakers, while later learners pattern with monolinguals in their L1 (e.g. Montrul, 2008; Montrul, 2009). These findings therefore indicate strongly that early (prepuberty) and late (postpuberty) exposure to an L2 environment have a different impact on possible fossilization and/or deterioration of the linguistic system.

=== Frequency of use ===
Frequency of use has been shown to be an important factor in language attrition. Decline in use of a given language leads to gradual loss of that language.

In the face of much evidence to the contrary, one study is often cited to suggest that frequency of use does not correlate strongly with language attrition. Their methodology, however, can be called into question, especially concerning the small sample size and the reliance on self reported data. The researchers themselves state that their findings may be inaccurate. The overall evidence suggests that frequency of use is a strong indicator of language attrition.

=== Motivation ===
Motivation could be defined as the willingness and desire to learn a second language, or, in the case of attrition, the incentive to maintain a language. Motivation can be split into four categories, but it is often simply split into two distinct forms: the instrumental and the integrative. Instrumental motivation, in the case of attrition, is the desire to maintain a language in order to complete a specific goal, i.e. maintaining a language to maintain a job. Integrative motivation, however, is motivation that comes from a desire to fit in or maintain one's cultural ties. These inferences can be drawn, as strategies for knowledge maintenance will, by definition, precisely oppose actions that lead to forgetting.

There are differences in attrition related to motivation depending on the type at hand. Instrumental motivation is often less potent than integrative motivation, but, given sufficient incentives, it can be equally as powerful. A 1972 study by Gardner and Lambert emphasized the importance of integrative motivation in particular in regards to factors relating to language acquisition, and, by extension, language attrition.

== Attrition in the brain ==
A study published in 2021 examines what language attrition looks like neurologically by studying EEGs (electroencephalograms) of students learning a foreign language. The study involved 26 out of 30 initial participants who were native Dutch (L1) speakers who had little to no prior knowledge of Italian (L3), and proficiency in English (L2) as their second language. The experiment involved all participants learning 70 non-cognate Italian words over two days, with no EEG taken. On the third day, an EEG was recorded for the entire session while participants attempted to retrieve half of their learned Italian words in English, and then took a recall test twice on all 70 learned Italian words. Incorrectness, partial correctness, and total correctness was used as a scoring guideline for these tests. This experiment tested attrition of the participants' L3 compared to their L2.

When analyzing the EEGs of the participants, the experimenters observed an enhanced early anterior negative deflection (N2), a peak on the EEG often observed during language switching, for items that took longer to recall in Italian. These are interpreted to represent interfering responses, possibly a result of interference between English and Italian. Another peak, the late positive component (LPC), which is often interpreted as an indicator of interference, was reduced for interfered items compared to non-interfered items. Lastly, theta bands on an EEG, which have previously been associated with semantic interference and active retrieval efforts, showed up more prominently when participants were asked to recognize words that they had retrieved both in English and Italian. While these must be further studied, these results give clues to what is occurring synaptically in the brain during language interference, and how that impacts attrition of a foreign language.

== Methods of prevention ==
Learning strategies can be an important part of preventing language attrition. Many researchers believe that language production skills, specifically writing and speaking, are significantly more susceptible to attrition than receptive skills like listening and reading. Accordingly, there are three methods of prevention:

One method is to focus on literacy and receptive learning, rather than teach students primarily to speak and write, in order to solidify receptive skills.

Another method is to encourage homework and practice that is not mechanical, but instead engaging and opportunistic. Rote learning and basic repetition are more susceptible to attrition. This is detrimental as the language is not learned in a meaningful way that reinforces cognitive understanding. Conversational-style homework and classroom settings, along with focuses on receptive skills, could make one's fluency less susceptible to attrition. Additionally, practice of higher-frequency items may be more useful since students will have less occasion to use lower-frequency items over time.

Another potential method of prevention is to alter the duration of instruction for a new language. According to Bardovi-Harlig and Stringer, a few months of intensive, engaging learning may have a greater impact on preventing attrition rather than years of traditional, mechanical learning. However, the initial stage of learning is argued to be important regardless of the duration of instruction.

== See also ==
- Cultural cringe
- Decreolization
- Dialect levelling
- Extinct language
- Linguistic imperialism
- Multilingualism
- Prestige language
- Second language attrition
- Semi-speaker

== Bibliography ==
- One Language or Two?: Answers to Questions about Bilingualism in Language-Delayed and Typically Developing Children
- Akinci, M.-A. (n.d.). Pratiques langagières et représentations subjectives de la vitalité ethnolinguistique des immigrés turcs en France. (retrieved from the Internet 2004/11/08).
- Ammerlaan, T. (1996). "You get a bit wobbly..." – Exploring bilingual lexical retrieval processes in the context of first language attrition. Unpublished Doctoral Dissertation, Nijmegen: Katholieke Universiteit Nijmegen.
- Ben-Rafael, M. & Schmid, M. S. (2007). "Language Attrition and Ideology: two groups of immigrants in Israel". In: Köpke, B., Schmid, M. S., Keijzer, M., and Dostert, S., editors, Language Attrition: theoretical perspectives, Amsterdam/Philadelphia: John Benjamins, 205–26.
- Bylund, E. (2008). Age Differences in First Language. Stockholm University PhD dissertation.
- Bylund, E. (2009). "Maturational constraints and first language attrition". In: Language Learning; 59(3): 687–715.
- Cook, V. (2005). "The changing L1 in the L2 user's mind". Paper presented at the 2nd International Conference on First Language Attrition, Amsterdam, 18 August 2005.
- Cook, V. (2003). "The changing L1 in the L2 user's mind". In: Vivian Cook (ed.), Effects of the Second Language on the First (pp. 1–18). Clevedon: Multilingual Matters.
- de Bot, K. & Clyne, M. (1994). "A 16-year longitudinal study of language attrition in Dutch immigrants in Australia". In: Journal of Multilingual and Multicultural Development; 15 (1), 17–28.
- de Bot, K., Gommans, P. & Rossing, C. (1991). "L1 loss in an L2 environment: Dutch immigrants in France". In: Seliger, H. W. & Vago, R. M. (eds.), First Language Attrition. (pp. 87–98). Cambridge: Cambridge University Press.
- Fujita, M. (2002). Second Language English Attrition of Japanese Bilingual Children. Unpublished doctoral dissertation, Temple University, Tokyo, Japan.
- Gardner, R. C., Lalonde, R. N, & Moorcroft, R. (1987). "Second Language Attrition: the role of motivation and use". Journal of Language and Social Psychology; Vol. 6, No. 1: 29–47.
- Gleason, J. Berko (1982). "Insights from Child Language Acquisition for Second Language Loss". In: Lambert, R. D. & Freed, B. F. (eds.), The Loss of Language Skills. Rowley, MA: Newbury House.
- Guardado, Martin (2017). "Heritage Language Development in Interlingual Families". In: P. P. Trifonas & T. Aravossitas (eds.), Handbook of research and practice in heritage language education. New York: Springer.
- Hansen, L. (2001). "Japanese Attrition in Contexts of Japanese Bilingualism". In: Noguchi, M. G. & Fotos, S. (eds.), Studies in Japanese Bilingualism (Bilingual Education and Bilingualism; 22.) (pp. 353–372). Clevedon: Multilingual Matters. (electronic book: ISBN 1-85359-708-2)
- Hansen, L. & Reetz-Kurashige, A. (1999). "Investigating Second Language Attrition: an introduction". In: Hansen, Lynne (ed.). "Second Language Attrition: evidence from Japanese contexts" (p. 6). Oxford: Oxford University Press.
- Hayashi, Brenda (1999). "Testing the regression hypotheis: the remains of the Japanese negation system in Micronesia". In: Hansen, Lynne (ed.). Second Language Attrition: evidence from Japanese contexts (pp. 154–168). Oxford: Oxford University Press.
- Hulsen, M. (2000). Language Loss and Language Processing: three generations of Dutch migrants in New Zealand. Unpublished doctoral dissertation, Nijmegen: Katholieke Universiteit Nijmegen.
- Hyltenstam, K. & Abrahamsson, N. (2003). "Maturational Constraints in SLA". In: Doughty, C. J. & Long, M. H. (eds.), The Handbook of Second Language Acquisition. Malden, MA: Blackwell ISBN 1-4051-3281-7.
- Jaspaert, K., Kroon, S., van Hout, R. (1986). "Points of Reference in First-Language Loss Research". In: Weltens, B., de Bot, K. & van Els, T. (eds.) "Language Attrition in Progress: studies on language acquisition" (pp. 37–49). Dordrecht: Foris Publications.
- Keijzer, M. (2007) "Last in first out? An investigation of the regression hypothesis in Dutch emigrants in Anglophone Canada". Vrije Universiteit Amsterdam, PhD dissertation.
- Köpke, B. 1999. L'attrition de la première langue chez le bilingue tardif: implications pour l'étude psycholinguistique du bilinguisme. Université de Toulouse-Le Mirail PhD dissertation. (in French)
- Köpke, B. 2007. "Language attrition at the crossroads of brain, mind and society". In: Köpke, B., Schmid, M. S., Keijzer, M., & Dostert, S., (eds.), Language Attrition: theoretical perspectives, Amsterdam/Philadelphia: John Benjamins, 9–37.
- Köpke, B. & Schmid, M. S. (2004). "Language attrition: the next phase". In: Schmid, M. S., et al. (eds.), pp. 1–43. Downloadable manuscript version
- Köpke, B., Schmid, M. S., Keijzer, M. & Dostert, S. (eds.). 2007. Language Attrition: theoretical perspectives. Amsterdam: John Benjamins.
- Lambert, R. D. & Freed, B. F. (eds). (1982). The Loss of Language Skills. Rowley, MA: Newbury House.
- Lambert, R. D. & Moore, S. J. (1986). "Problem Areas in the Study of Language Attrition". In: Weltens, B., de Bot, K. & van Els, T. (eds.), Language Attrition in Progress, Studies on Language Acquisition (pp. 177–186). Dordrecht, NL: Foris Publications.
- Montrul, S. 2004. "Convergent outcomes in L2 acquisition and L1 loss". In: Schmid, M. S., Köpke, B., Keijzer, M. & Weilemar, L. (eds.), First Language Attrition: interdisciplinary perspectives on methodological issues (pp. 259–279). Amsterdam: John Benjamins.
- Montrul, S. 2008. Incomplete Acquisition in Bilingualism: re-examining the age factor. Amsterdam: John Benjamins.
- Montrul, S. 2009. "Re-examining the fundamental difference hypothesis". In: Studies in Second Language Acquisition; vol. 31: 225–257.
- Murtagh, Lelia (2003). Retention and Attrition of Irish as a Second Language: a longitudinal study of general and communicative proficiency in Irish among second level school leavers and the influence of instructional background, language use and attitude/motivation variables. Proefschrift (ter verkrijging van het doctoraat in de Letteren), Rijksuniversiteit Groningen. (retrieved November 24, 2004)
  - Retention and Attrition of Irish as a Second Language (PDF: 5.2 MB) by Lelia Murtagh: PhD thesis, University of Groningen.
- Obler, L. K. (1993). "Neurolinguistic aspects of second language development and attrition". In: Hyltenstam, K. & Viberg, A. (eds.), Progression & Regression in Language: sociocultural, neuropsychological, & linguistic perspectives (pp. 178 – 195). Stockholm: Centre for Research on Bilingualism; Cambridge University Press.
- Olshtain, E. & Barzilay, M. (1991). "Lexical retrieval difficulties in adult language attrition". In: Seliger, H. W. & Vago, R. M. (eds.), First Language Attrition. Cambridge: Cambridge University Press.
- Pallier, C. (2007). "Critical periods in language acquisition and language attrition". In: Köpke et al. (eds.) Language Attrition: theoretical perspectives, Amsterdam/Philadelphia: John Benjamins, 155–168.
- Paradis, M. (2007). "L1 attrition features predicted by a neurolinguistic theory of bilingualism". In: Köpke, B., Schmid, M. S., Keijzer, M., and Dostert, S., (eds.), Language Attrition: theoretical perspectives, Amsterdam/Philadelphia: John Benjamins, 121–33.
- Pavlenko, A. (2003). "«I feel clumsy speaking Russian»: L2 influence on L1 in narratives of Russian L2 users of English". In: Cook, V. (ed.), Effects of the Second Language on the First (pp. 32–61). Clevedon: Multilingual Matters.
- Pavlenko, A. (2004). "L2 influence and L1 attrition in adult bilingualism". In: Schmid, M. S., Köpke, B., Keijzer, M. & Weilemar, L. (eds), First Language Attrition: interdisciplinary perspectives on methodological issues (pp. 47–59). Amsterdam: John Benjamins.
- Pelc, L. (2001). L1 Lexical, Morphological and Morphosyntactic Attrition in Greek-English Bilinguals. CUNY PhD dissertation.
- Russell, Robert (1999). "Lexical maintenance and attrition in Japanese as a second language". In: Hansen, Lynne (ed.).Second Language Attrition: evidence from Japanese contexts (pp. 114–141). Oxford: Oxford University Press.
- Schmid, M. S. (2002). First Language Attrition, Use, and Maintenance: the case of German Jews in Anglophone countries. Amsterdam: John Benjamins.
- Schmid, M. S. (2007). "The role of L1 use for L1 attrition". In: Köpke et al. (eds), Language Attrition: theoretical perspectives, Amsterdam/Philadelphia: John Benjamins; 135–153. Downloadable manuscript version
- Schmid, M. S. (2009). "On L1 attrition and the linguistic system". In: EUROSLA Yearbook 9, 212–244. Downloadable manuscript version
- Schmid, M. S. (2011). Language Attrition. Cambridge University Press.
- Schmid, M. S. (2012). "The impact of age and exposure on forgetting and retention of the birth language in international adoptees: a perspective from Holocaust survivors" (PDF). Linguistic Approaches to Bilingualism. 2 (2): 177–208. doi:10.1075/lab.2.2.03sch.
- Schmid, M. S., Köpke, B., Keijzer, M. & Weilemar, L. (2004). First Language Attrition: interdisciplinary perspectives on methodological issues. Amsterdam/Philadelphia: John Benjamins.
- Schmid, M. S. & Köpke, B. (2007). "Bilingualism and attrition". In: Köpke, B., Schmid, M. S., Keijzer, M., and Dostert, S., (eds.), Language Attrition: theoretical perspectives, Amsterdam/Philadelphia: John Benjamins, 1–7. Downloadable manuscript version
- Schmid, M. S. & Köpke, B. (2008). "L1 attrition and the mental lexicon". In: Pavlenko, A. (ed.) The Bilingual Mental Lexicon: interdisciplinary approaches (pp. 209–238). Clevedon: Multilingual Matters. Downloadable manuscript version
- Schmid, M. S. & Dusseldorp, E. (2010). "Quantitative analyses in a multivariate study of language attrition". In: Second Language Research; 26(1). Downloadable manuscript version
- Seliger, H. W. & Vago, R. M. (1991). "The Study of First Language Attrition: an overview". In: First Language Attrition, Seliger, H. W. & Vago, R. M. (eds.), pp. 3–15. Cambridge University Press.
- Smith, M. Sharwood (1983). "On explaining language loss". In: Felix, S. & Wode, H. (eds.), Language Development on the Crossroads, pp. 49–69. Tübingen: Gunter Narr.
- Sorace, A. 2005. "Selective optionality in language development". In: Cornips, L. & Corrigan, K. P., (eds.), Syntax and Variation: reconciling the biological and the social, pp. 55–80 Amsterdam/Philadelphia: John Benjamins.
- Tsimpli, I. (2007). "First language attrition from a minimalist perspective: interface vulnerability and processing effects". In: Köpke et al. (eds.), Language Attrition: theoretical perspectives, Amsterdam/Philadelphia: John Benjamins; pp. 83–98.
- Tsimpli, I., Sorace, A., Heycock, C. & Filiaci, F. (2004). "First language attrition and syntactic subjects: a study of Greek and Italian near-native speakers of English". In: International Journal of Bilingualism; 8(3): 257–277.
- Tsushima, R.; Guardado, Martin (2019). "'Rules...I Want Someone to Make them Clear': Japanese Mothers in Montreal Talk About Multilingual Parenting". Journal of Language, Identity, and Education. 18 (5): 311–328. doi:10.1080/15348458.2019.1645017. S2CID 202248430.
- Yamamoto, M. (2001). Language Use in Interlingual Families: a Japanese-English sociolinguistic study. Clevedon: Multilingual Matters
- Yoshitomi, A (1992). "Towards a Model of Language Attrition: neurological and psychological contributions". Issues in Applied Linguistics. 3 (2): 293–318. doi:10.5070/L432005161.
- Yukawa, E. (1998). L1 Japanese Attrition and Regaining: three case studies of two early bilingual children. Tokyo: Kurosio Publishers.
