= Simultaneous bilingualism =

Bilingualism by learning two languages from birth

Simultaneous bilingualism is a form of bilingualism that takes place when a child becomes bilingual by learning two languages from birth. According to Annick De Houwer, in an article in The Handbook of Child Language, simultaneous bilingualism takes place in "children who are regularly addressed in two spoken languages from before the age of two and who continue to be regularly addressed in those languages up until the final stages" of language development. Both languages are acquired as first languages. This is in contrast to sequential bilingualism, in which the second language is learned not as a native language but a foreign language.

== Prevalence ==
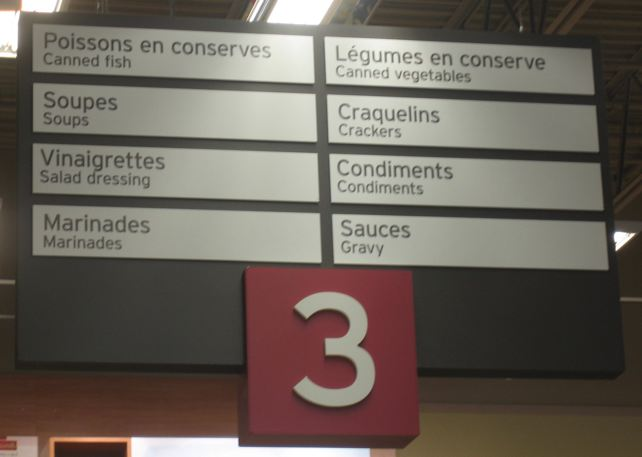
A bilingual sign in a Quebec supermarket

It is estimated that half of the world is functionally bilingual, and the majority of those bilinguals are 'native speakers' of their two languages. Wölck has pointed out that there are many "native bilingual communities", typically in South America, Africa, and Asia, where "monolingual norms may be unavailable or nonexistent".

== Beliefs about simultaneous bilingualism ==
Some popular misconceptions about bilingualism include the ideas that bilingual children will not reach proficiency in either language and that they will be cognitively disadvantaged. Many studies in the early 20th century found evidence of a "language handicap" in simultaneously bilingual children, linking bilingualism with a lower intelligence. However, many of these studies had serious methodological flaws. For example, several studies relating bilingualism and intelligence did not account for socioeconomic differences among well-educated, upper class monolingual children and less-educated (often immigrant) bilingual children.

Recent research has found evidence that simultaneous bilinguals have a cognitive advantage over their monolingual counterparts, particularly in the areas of cognitive flexibility, analytical skill, and metalinguistic awareness. However, most studies agree that simultaneous bilinguals do not have any definitive cognitive advantage over monolinguals.

Despite these findings, many therapists and other professionals maintain that simultaneous bilingualism can be harmful for a child's cognitive development. One side argues that only one language should be spoken until fluently spoken and then incorporate the second language. The other side argues that the child, whether simultaneously bilingual or not, would still have speech issues. Some bilingual families have chosen to stop speaking a language after hearing about the supposed negative developmental effects of child bilingualism from people in authority.

People were once concerned that being exposed to more than one language would be confusing and cause bilinguals to lag behind their monolingual peers in language development, but multiple researchers have refuted this claim. Bilinguals appear to acquire the same milestones—including when they say their first word, when they say their first telegraphic phrase, and when they obtain a vocabulary of fifty words—within the "normal range of variation" of monolingual development in each language. This is an analysis of overall vocabulary in bilinguals, as this is the more accurate and appropriate measure of language development in bilinguals. Analyzing only one of a bilingual individual's languages would seriously underestimate their true vocabulary knowledge. Any vocabulary deficits in one language are likely filled by knowledge in the other language, suggesting a likelihood that bilinguals know more vocabulary words than monolinguals in general. To this effect, researchers emphasize the importance of assessing overall vocabulary in bilinguals because assessing only one is an underestimation of their true knowledge, and when assessed in overall vocabulary bilingual children were no different from monolingual children in terms of language development.

== Importance ==
Studying bilingual acquisition is important because it may have real effects on academic performances for bilingual children in school. Research has shown that vocabulary size is an indicator of academic performance and literacy. It is known that different contexts can cause differences in vocabulary in each language. Despite these differences, have suggested that bilingual children are not necessarily disadvantaged in academic performance or academic spoken language because they have a good grasp on the language used for their academics. Regardless, home vocabulary is still relevant to academic life, and it is important to get a better balance in vocabulary acquisition to be able to effectively communicate in both languages.

As researchers have shown, context is also incredibly important to the acquisition of bilingual vocabulary. Speaking with children in different languages in different contexts will allow them to gain a more full vocabulary in each language. Furthermore, increasing the number of people children interact with in each language will provide them with more opportunities to learn in varied contexts. Study has provided evidence against the popular "one-parent-one-language" approach, as it restricted the contexts a child had for interactions and use of that language.

Due to the effects of environment on language acquisition, it is important that all languages are valued and have support for proper bilingual growth. This includes having proper resources to encourage learning and use of multiple languages. This is difficult for people from lower socioeconomic backgrounds who do not have access to special bilingual schools.

== Bilingual acquisition ==
According to De Houwer, there is no established normal development pattern for simultaneous bilinguals. However, similar language development patterns have been seen in bilingual and monolingual children. Language acquisition in simultaneous bilinguals generally takes two common forms of exposure to a second language:

- A one-person–one-language pattern, where each parent communicates in only one of the two languages to the child or
- both parents speak both languages to the child.

=== Language input in bilingual acquisition ===
The most influential factor in bilingual language acquisition is the languages spoken by parents to their children, and the languages spoken by others with whom the child comes into contact. This language exposure is called comprehensible input. In a 1984 edition of Bilingual Education Paper Series, Carolyn Kessler claimed that "children develop faster in the language which is used most in their environment", which may or may not reflect the language of the surrounding community. However, bilingual acquisition can also be affected by the amount of input, the separation of input, and the stability of input, as well as attitudes about bilingualism.

==== Amount of language input ====
It is important to consider amount of input, because not only do the languages of each person affect bilingualism; the amount of time each main input carrier spends with the child also has an effect.

It may be the amount of exposure to each language that is the factor for whether or not a bilingual child develops similarly to a monolingual child in each of those languages. Research has shown that children who are exposed less to a language will have "significantly lower receptive vocabulary scores for" that language. By contrast, the receptive vocabulary of bilingual children does not appear to be different from that of monolingual children when 40% to 60% of their language exposure is to that language. Vocabulary size in each language appears to be affected by both the "frequency of exposure" and the "differences in context of exposure" to that language. Varying contexts of exposure provide more opportunities for bilingual children to learn more words. Bilinguals who are exposed to more of one language than another will perform similarly on tasks to monolinguals of that language, but they will lag behind in vocabulary of the other language.

In addition to exposure, research has shown that the context of the language exposure and language use also affects vocabulary. Particularly, studies have shown that vocabularies seem to be separated by a "home context" versus a "school context", depending on what language input they are getting in each. Because this pattern was seen across children with different language backgrounds, this suggests the differences in receptive vocabulary could not be attributable to the different cultural contexts, which has been suggested as an alternative explanation.

==== Separation of language input ====
There is a spectrum ranging from zero to total separation of language by person. Usually, a simultaneous bilingual child's situation is somewhere in the middle. Some linguistic experts, dating from the early 20th century, have maintained that the best way to facilitate bilingual acquisition is to have each main input carrier (usually parents) use one and only one language with the child. By having each parent speak one of the two languages, this method (known as the "one person, one language" approach) attempts to prevent the child from confusing the two languages.

However, the lack of language separation by person does not necessarily lead to failure to communicate effectively in two languages. Further studies have shown that a "one person, one language" approach may not be necessary for the early separation of language systems to occur. Children appear to be able to disentangle the two languages themselves.

There has been little research done on other methods of language separation. De Houwer points out that input may be separated by situation: for example, "Finnish spoken by all family members inside the home but Swedish once they are outside."

==== Input stability ====
A change in a child's linguistic environment can trigger language attrition. Sometimes, when input for one language is lost before the final stage of development, children may lose their ability to speak the "lost" language. This leaves them able to speak only the other language, yet fully capable of understanding both.

==== Attitudes ====
The parents' expectations and knowledge about language development can be instrumental in raising simultaneously bilingual children. Parental attitudes toward "their roles and linguistic choices" also play a part in the child's linguistic development. The attitudes of the child's extended family and friends have been shown to affect successful bilingualism.

The extent to which a language is valued also has an effect on language acquisition in bilingual children. Languages that are deemed more useful or more important will dominate the bilingual mental lexicon while the less valued ones will not be acquired as fully. Studies have shown that children showed slower receptive vocabulary development in what they termed the 'minority' language while the children showed monolingual-like development in the 'majority' language. This has been attributed to the lack of opportunities bilinguals had available for the acquisition and development of their 'minority' language.

Other studies have found that in a context where both languages are valued, the acquisition of the languages is not affected. This may be because there are more opportunities to use both languages.

== Theories of simultaneous bilingual acquisition ==
=== Unitary language system hypothesis ===
Virginia Volterra and Traute Taeschner put forth an influential study in 1978, positing that bilingual children move from a stage where the two languages are lexically mixed into eventual structural differentiation between the languages. They theorized that until age two, a child does not differentiate between languages. There are 3 main stages identified by this hypothesis:

Stage One – L1 and L2 comprise one language system until approximately 3 years of age.

Stage Two – L1 vocabulary separates from L2 but the grammar remains as one language

Stage Three – The language systems become differentiated. The child is fully bilingual

This "unitary language system hypothesis" has been the subject of much debate in the linguistic world. Since its publication, this system has been discredited, and current linguistic evidence now points to two separate language systems.

=== Dual language system hypothesis ===
In contrast, the dual language system hypothesis states that bilinguals have a separate system for the L1 and L2 which they learn right from the start, so both languages can be acquired simultaneously. Research on vocabulary development have generally provided strong support for this theory. Monolingual children in early language development learn one term for each concept, so does a bilingual child, just that the bilingual child does so for both L1 and L2, and hence they know two language terms of the same concept that has similar meaning, which is also known as translational equivalents. The awareness of synonyms do not appear till a much later age. For example, they know that both 'two' in English and 'dos' in Spanish refer to the numerical number '2'.

This theory has been further supported by research on the acquisition of the grammatical and morphological components of language. By analyzing the speech of bilingual children where elements of the two languages differ, studies have revealed that children tend to incorporate the appropriate word order and agreement morphemes when speaking each language. Furthermore, research indicates that children form separate phonemes and phonological rules for different languages.

Research studying the acquisition of both spoken and sign language also lends support to this theory. A study examining the acquisition of both spoken and sign language by children of deaf parents indicated that the children acquired both languages in the same manner as children learning two spoken languages. Moreover, the study indicated that bilingual children, including those learning both spoken and sign language, were able to acquire various linguistic concepts at the same rate as monolingual children. While bilingual children tend to include mixed language in their speech, children acquiring both spoken and sign language have shown indications of simultaneous language mixing by both speaking and signing certain words together. Though it is only possible to observe this type of language mixing when the child is learning both spoken and sign language, it provides support for the Dual Language System Hypothesis, indicating that the simultaneous operation of separate two language systems could be a cause of language mixing by bilingual children.

== Bilingual acquisition versus monolingual acquisition ==
The study of simultaneous bilingualism supplements general (monolingual) theories of child language acquisition. It particularly illuminates the critical role of the nature of language input in language development. This indicates that the form of language input must be similarly influential in monolinguals.

=== Difficulties ===
However, it has proven difficult to compare monolingual and bilingual development, for a number of reasons:

- Many languages have little data
- The data that exist may not represent the normal population of children
- There are contradictions in the literature concerning normal monolingual development
- There are a large number of variables between bilingual and monolingual children besides the number of languages they speak
- It can be difficult to differentiate between universal developmental processes and cases of language transfer

=== Findings ===
Meisel claims "there is no reason to believe that the underlying principles and mechanisms of language development [in bilinguals] are qualitatively different from those used by monolinguals." Döpke has hypothesized that communication styles that facilitate monolingual development are a major variable in successful bilingual development. Meisel proposed in a 1990 article that "bilinguals tend to focus more on formal aspects of language and are therefore able to acquire certain grammatical constructions faster than many or most monolinguals."

One area of language acquisition that has been studied extensively is the use of the disambiguation heuristic, which is the tendency by children to "associate a novel word with a novel object". This tendency has been observed in numerous studies conducted with monolingual children; however, it appears that bilingual children either somewhat use it or don't use it at all.

Byers‐Heinlein & Werker (2009) studied 48 17 and 18-month-old monolingual (English), bilingual, and trilingual (22 diverse languages) infants to compare their patterns on disambiguation. They studied infants at this age because this is when the heuristic has been shown to appear in monolingual infants. Additionally, they studied bilinguals from multiple diverse language backgrounds to show that the patterns were not language-specific but rather characteristic of bilingualism in general. they found that monolinguals showed disambiguation, bilinguals somewhat, and trilinguals did not. Byers‐Heinlein & Werker (2009) hypothesized that this was particularly an effect of translation equivalents (knowing the name for something in more than one language), as "they represent a departure from the one-to-one mapping between word and concept that is typical of monolingual vocabularies" (p 820). Indeed, in a later study conducted by Byers-Heinlein & Werker (2013) in 17–18 month-old Chinese-English bilingual infants, results showed that disambiguation did not occur in the infants who "understood the translation equivalents for more than half of the words in their vocabularies" (p. 407), while disambiguation occurred in those who knew fewer translation equivalents. They also suggested that the reverse could be possible—that infants who employed the heuristic were the ones that did acquire the translation equivalents because of the high level of one-to-one mapping. also say that disambiguation and language exposure are not correlated, but the presence or absence of translation equivalents could be attributed by the amount of exposure in each language the child gets. Particularly, if children receive more exposure in both languages, they are likely to have both words for a given object or concept, but if they have less exposure in one language they will likely lack the appropriate amount of translation equivalents, thereby exhibiting disambiguation.

== Bilingual lexical representations ==
One aspect is determining how lexical structures are represented in the brains of bilinguals versus monolinguals, as bilinguals must map two different languages. Particularly, researchers have been interested in determining if a bilingual individual has two separate lexicons for each language or one containing both. found that the language input children received was important in "determining how independent one language will be from the other in the child's mind" (p. 646). Research on how lexical items are accessed in a bilingual brain has tended toward a mixed representation, where there is interconnectivity and some overlapping of the two lexicons but other items stay separated.

Spreading activation, a process where similar concepts are activated when their neighbors are activated, is a widely accepted model of lexical access. It has been shown in both bilingual and monolingual individuals, with bilinguals showing activation in both languages during language research tasks. Multiple studies have shown that bilinguals recognize cognate words more quickly than non-cognate words, especially identical cognates, which produce the strongest effect. These effects occurred even when the participants knew ahead of time what language the target words would be in. Despite the specific language contexts, both languages are activated, showing that lexical access is not language-specific and that top-down processing is important in lexical access. Findings suggest that the amount of activation that occurred cross-linguistically was related to the similarity between the translation equivalents of the languages.

These findings suggest that when bilinguals read sentences, the language of the sentence does not necessarily act as an early cue for the restriction of the individual's lexical search to one language or the other. Rather, this decision is made later. This is similar to semantic priming in monolinguals. When monolinguals read a sentence that is semantically ambiguous (for example, in the sentence "He saw the bug" "bug" could mean insect or could mean a spy device), they will prime both meanings of the word and then later narrow it down to one. It is first a parallel process and then a serial process. When bilinguals read sentences, they go through a similar process with which language they should interpret the sentence.

This interconnectivity of both languages in the bilingual brain can also have effects on the way concepts are represented in the bilingual mind. There is a mutual influence that seems to occur in the bilingual brain. Studies of categorization by bilinguals show that categories are simplified in the brains of bilinguals compared to monolinguals. Specifically, the corresponding category centers (examples of typical category exemplars) were closer together for bilinguals than monolinguals. Additionally, bilinguals showed a pattern of having "less complex category boundaries" (p. 270), which is where atypical exemplars would be placed, and "more similar centers of corresponding categories" (p. 288) than monolinguals. This shows the mutual influence that two languages can have on the representation of concepts in the brain.

Many have suggested that bilinguals have weaker connections in their lexical representations than monolinguals (Bialystok, Luk, Peets, & Yang, 2010; Ameel, Malt, Storms, & Van Assche, 2009). It is believed that this is because bilinguals get less practice with each language because they use each less often than a monolingual person uses their language, giving them half of the opportunity "to receive feedback in each language" and deepen their "mappings between words and objects in each language" (p. 272).

The findings of cross-lingual activation can be used as support for a model of interconnectivity of a bilingual individual's languages in their mental lexicon. The two languages are "not separate and encapsulated", but rather "interrelated and subject to interaction" (p. 272).

=== Possible models for lexical representation ===
Van Holzen relates the following:

Bilingual Model of Lexical Access (BIMOLA) This model suggests there are two "separate but interconnected lexicons" in the bilingual brain (p. 583). This, however, was discredited by a study done by Von Holzen & Mani (2012) because it does not provide a possible mechanism to explain the cross-language activation seen in studies of lexical access.

Processing Rich Information from Multidimensional Interactive Representations (PRIMIR) This model suggests one integrated phono-lexical system that is organized based on the different characteristics of language input. This model "allows for both cross-language effects while also noting stronger within-language effects" (Von Holzen & Mani, 2012, p. 583)

Revised Hierarchical Model This model suggests that first language words are linked to concepts while second language words are linked directly to first language words, not concepts, but the greater proficiency and skill a person has in the second language, the greater the link will be to the actual concepts themselves. This model can also be supported by research done on second language acquisition because when people learn new languages later in life they will learn translation equivalents and learn what certain words mean based on their first language words.

Bilingual Interactive Activation + Model This model is similar to the revised hierarchical model and suggests the lexicon of a bilingual individual is integrated, containing the words for both languages. This accounts for the simultaneous parallel activation of both languages during language tasks, the late activation of language in semantic processing, and the lack of effects of code switching. This lack of cost for code switching is especially used because they argue that separate lexicons would cause a slower reaction time, which was not indicated in the findings.

== Language dominance ==
Though simultaneous bilingual children learn two languages at once, this does not mean that they speak both with identical competence. It is common for young simultaneous bilinguals to be more proficient in one language than the other, and this is probably related to each child's relative exposure to each language; for example, many bilingual children are more proficient in the mother's than the father's language, arguably because their mothers assume most of the childcare responsibilities and/or simply spend more time with their children. The dominant language is almost always the language spoken by the greatest number of the people the child interacts with (generally the language they are educated in). The child sees this language as more effective and begins to favor it. However, their dominant language need not be their L1. In addition, it is possible to show language dominance in one language for one domain and dominance in the other language for another domain. For example, a child may be dominant in their L1 at home, but in the school context, their L2 becomes the dominant language being used.

Research has suggested that a child's language dominance can shift over time due to the change in their language environment.

There are multiple ways to measure the language dominance of a simultaneous bilingual child. Researchers approaching dominance as "relative language proficiency" adopt measures such as mean length of utterance (MLU), upper bound (UB), percentage of multimorphemic utterances (MMUs), lexical access, and lexicon size. Those researchers who emphasise dominance as "language use" tend to adopt experience-based variables, such as the child’s language input and output. Some studies have suggested that the measurement choice should be guided by the purpose of investigation because there is no single ‘best’ measure that suits all groups and purposes. Since language dominance is a multifaceted construct, adopting several measurements in a single study may not always be the best decision if the researcher does not have a good understanding regarding the extent to which their measurement choices correspond to their dependent variables. Instead, it is vital for the researcher to select the right measurement tool(s) from the beginning. The measurement choices may be well justified by considerations, such as the typological compatibility of the language pair (e.g., Cantonese-English compatibility) in the child's profile.

== Code-switching ==
Code-switching occurs when a child combines more than one language in a single utterance. This phenomenon is also seen in bilingual adults. Bilingual children most often engage in intra-sentential code-switching, switching languages in the middle of a sentence. There are also studies focusing on bilingual children's inter-sentential code-switching behaviour. Bilingual children code-switch for several reasons, including the following:

=== Equivalency problems ===
Bilingual children often interject words from the other language when they do not know or cannot remember the equivalent, and when one language has no suitable equivalent in the other. Taeschner found that bilingual children prefer to insert elements of the other language rather than use simplified forms.

=== Social norms ===
Code-switching has also been tied to the bilingual child's socialization process. According to Poplack, a bilingual child code-switches based on the perceived linguistic norms of the situation and the perceived bilingual ability of the hearer.

=== Parental interaction ===
Children will mirror their parents in this aspect of speech. If a child's parents engage in code-switching in their own speech, this will affect the child's perception of the appropriateness of mixing languages.

=== Language dominance ===
Whether and how a child's code-switching behaviour is shaped by their language dominance is a controversial issue. Some research has indicated that in societies where intra-sentential (but not inter-sentential) code-switching is a common social practice, inter-sentential code-switching may serve as signs of a bilingual child’s language-dominance status.

== Further research ==
There is currently no differentiation of normal and deviant bilingual development.

Further study into the effects of changing a child's linguistic environment could uncover the minimal language input required to maintain "active use potential" in a particular language.

Simultaneous trilingualism is also possible. There is significantly less research in this area than in simultaneous bilingualism. However, trilingual language acquisition in young children has been shown to generally mirror bilingual acquisition.

== See also ==
- Sequential bilingualism
- Multilingualism
- Monolingualism
- Language acquisition
- Second-language acquisition
- Comprehensible input

By ISO 639-3 code
Enter an ISO code to find the corresponding language article.
