= Participatory cues =

Component of educational media

Participatory cues are overt actions by on-screen characters prompting a reaction from a viewing audience. Specifically, participatory cues are defined as when characters "break the fourth wall, the imaginary wall at the front of the stage, by asking children to respond to queries and build in pauses to allow children time to respond to these queries".

Participatory cues are commonly seen in children’s educational television programs such as Blue's Clues, Dora the Explorer, and Mickey Mouse Clubhouse. For example, a program host directly addressing the camera and asking for the audience's help is a participatory cue.

== Research ==
Communication researchers have investigated participatory cues in conjunction with educational learning goals. Research investigating participatory cues often measures the success of an educational program through transfer of learning, or the degree to which an individual can apply the knowledge learned to a novel context.

The efficacy of participatory cues has been debated by scholars. Early research about participatory cues in Blue’s Clues found children who viewed the program demonstrated greater learning compared to children who viewed a program without participatory cues. Piotrowski later found that participatory cues were successful in encouraging learning when paired with program familiarity. In other words, children who were familiar with a program that used participatory cues scored better on learning outcomes, however children unfamiliar with the program did not. Conversely, Krcmar and Cingel found that children who viewed a show with participatory cues learned a new word better than children who watched the same show without participatory cues.
