= Virginia Yip =

Hong Kong linguist and writer

- 葉彩燕
- Born: 1962 (age 63–64)
- Spouse: Stephen Matthews
- Awards: CUHK Research Excellence Award (2006–2007); Leonard Bloomfield Book Award (with Stephen Matthews) (2009)

Academic background
- Education: University of Texas at Austin (BA, MA); University of Southern California (PhD)
- Thesis: Aspects of Chinese/English Interlanguage: Syntax, Semantics and Learnability (1989)
- Academic advisors: Bill Rutherford; Jacquelyn Schachter

Academic work
- Discipline: Linguist
- Sub-discipline: Second-language acquisition; Bilingual language acquisition
- Institutions: Chinese University of Hong Kong

Virginia Yip (葉彩燕), is a Hong Kong linguist and writer. She is director of the Childhood Bilingualism Research Centre. She is a professor at the Chinese University of Hong Kong. Her research interests include bilingual language acquisition, second language acquisition, Cantonese, Chaozhou and comparative Sinitic grammar, psycholinguistics, and cognitive science.

== Biography ==
Virginia Yip received her B.A. in linguistics at the University of Texas at Austin and, in 1989, her Ph.D. from the University of Southern California.

She is the author of Interlanguage and Learnability: from Chinese to English (Benjamins) and co-author of a series of works on Cantonese grammar published by Routledge: Cantonese: A Comprehensive Grammar (which has been translated into Japanese), Basic Cantonese, and Intermediate Cantonese.

She and her team have created the Hong Kong Bilingual Child Language Corpus, the first longitudinal bilingual corpus in which Cantonese is represented along with English, and the largest multimedia bilingual corpus in the Child Language Data Exchange System (CHILDES) based at Carnegie Mellon University.

Yip is married to linguist Stephen Matthews from the University of Hong Kong. They have three bilingual children: a son and two daughters.

== The Hong Kong Bilingual Child Language Corpus ==
The Hong Kong Bilingual Child Language Corpus, which is reported in 2005 as the world's largest video-linked database of children becoming bilingual, created by Yip, and her husband, Stephen Matthews from The University of Hong Kong — features 170 hours of audio and video files of four families raising their children bilingually in Cantonese and English. The project, which includes transcripts and searchable video and audio segments, took 10 years to compile.

This database has already been the data source for several undergraduate and graduate dissertations in Hong Kong, and it is the basis of a book, The Bilingual Child, written by Yip and Matthews and published by Cambridge University Press in 2007. The database focuses on children who are bilingual in English and Cantonese and who learned to speak two languages through the one-parent, one-language approach. Using that method, one parent speaks to the child in one language, and the other parent speaks to the child in another.

== Honors and awards ==
- CUHK Research Excellence Award 2006–2007
- Leonard Bloomfield Book Award (2009), Linguistic Society of America

== Books and publications ==
- Matthews, Stephen. & Virginia Yip, 1994. Cantonese: A Comprehensive Grammar. London: Routledge. (on-line review by Marjorie Chan); Japanese edition by E. Chishima and S. Kataoka, Tokyo: Toho Shoten, 2000.
- Yip, Virginia. 1995. Interlanguage and Learnability: from Chinese to English. Amsterdam: John Benjamins.
- Yip, Virginia. & Stephen Matthews, 2000. Basic Cantonese: a Grammar and Workbook. London: Routledge.
- Yip, Virginia. & Stephen Matthews, 2001. Intermediate Cantonese: a Grammar and Workbook. London: Routledge. (on-line review by Blaine Erickson)
- Yip, Virginia. & Stephen Matthews (馬詩帆), 2007. The Bilingual Child: early development and language contact (雙語兒童：早期發展與語言接觸). Cambridge University Press.

- Cai Ya Qing (蔡雅菁): The Bilingual Child: Early Development and Language Contact/雙語兒童：早期發展及語言接觸 (Mandarin Chinese translation). Beijing: Beijing World Publishing Corporation.

- Stephen Matthews & Virginia Yip, 2011. Cantonese: A Comprehensive Grammar. 2nd edition. London: Routledge.
