= Transfer of learning =

Educational psychology concept

Transfer of learning occurs when people apply information, strategies, and skills they have learned to a new situation or context. Transfer is not a discrete activity, but is rather an integral part of the learning process. Researchers attempt to identify when and how transfer occurs and to offer strategies to improve transfer.

== Overview ==
The formal discipline (or mental discipline) approach to learning believed that specific mental faculties could be strengthened by particular courses of training and that these strengthened faculties transferred to other situations, based on faculty psychology which viewed the mind as a collection of separate modules or faculties assigned to various mental tasks. This approach resulted in school curricula that required students to study subjects such as mathematics and Latin in order to strengthen reasoning and memory faculties.

Disputing formal discipline, Edward Thorndike and Robert S. Woodworth in 1901 postulated that the transfer of learning was restricted or assisted by the elements in common between the original context and the next context. The notion was originally introduced as transfer of practice. They explored how individuals would transfer learning in one context to another similar context and how "improvement in one mental function" could influence a related one. Their theory implied that transfer of learning depends on how similar the learning task and transfer tasks are, or where "identical elements are concerned in the influencing and influenced function", now known as the identical element theory. Thorndike urged schools to design curricula with tasks similar to those students would encounter outside of school to facilitate the transfer of learning.

In contrast to Thorndike, Edwin Ray Guthrie's law of contiguity expected little transfer of learning. Guthrie recommended studying in the exact conditions in which one would be tested, because of his view that "we learn what we do in the presence of specific stimuli". The expectation is that training in conditions as similar as possible to those in which learners will have to perform will facilitate transfer.

The argument is also made that transfer is not distinct from learning, as people do not encounter situations as blank slates. Perkins and Salomon considered it more a continuum, with no bright line between learning and transfer.

Transfer may also be referred to as generalization, B. F. Skinner's concept of a response to a stimulus occurring to other stimuli.

Today, transfer of learning is usually described as the process and the effective extent to which past experiences (also referred to as the transfer source) affect learning and performance in a new situation (the transfer target). However, there remains controversy as to how transfer of learning should be conceptualized and explained, what its prevalence is, what its relation is to learning in general, and whether it exists at all.

== Transfer and learning ==
People store propositions, or basic units of knowledge, in long-term memory. When new information enters the working memory, long-term memory is searched for associations which combine with the new information in working memory. The associations reinforce the new information and help assign meaning to it. Learning that takes place in varying contexts can create more links and encourage generalization of the skill or knowledge. Connections between past learning and new learning can provide a context or framework for the new information, helping students to determine sense and meaning, and encouraging retention of the new information. These connections can build up a framework of associative networks that students can call upon for future problem-solving. Information stored in memory is "flexible, interpretive, generically altered, and its recall and transfer are largely context-dependent".

When Thorndike refers to similarity of elements between learning and transfer, the elements can be conditions or procedures. Conditions can be environmental, physical, mental, or emotional, and the possible combinations of conditions are countless. Procedures include sequences of events or information. Although the theory is that the similarity of elements facilitates transfer, there is a challenge in identifying which specific elements had an effect on the learner at the time of learning.

Factors that can affect transfer include:

- Context and degree of original learning: how well the learner acquired the knowledge.
- Similarity: commonalities between original learning and new, such as environment and other memory cues.
- Critical attributes: characteristics that make something unique.
- Association: connections between multiple events, actions, bits of information, and so on; as well as the conditions and emotions connected to it by the learner.

Learners can increase transfer through effective practice and by mindfully abstracting knowledge. Abstraction is the process of examining our experiences for similarities. Methods for abstracting knowledge include seeking the underlying principles in what is learned, creating models, and identifying analogies and metaphors, all of which assist with creating associations and encouraging transfer.

== Transfer taxonomies ==
Transfer of learning can be cognitive, socio-emotional, or motor. The following table presents different types of transfer.

Type	Characteristics
Positive	Positive transfer occurs when prior learning assists new learning.
Negative	Negative transfer occurs when prior learning hinders or interferes with new learning.
Zero	Zero transfer occurs when prior learning has no influence on new learning.
Near	Near transfer occurs when many elements overlap between the conditions in which the learner obtained the knowledge or skill and the new situation.
Far	Far transfer occurs when the new situation is very different from that in which learning occurred.
Literal	Literal transfer occurs when performing the skill exactly as learned but in a new situation.
Figural	Figural transfer occurs when applying general knowledge to a new situation, often making use of analogies or metaphors.
Low road	Low-road transfer occurs when well-established skills transfer spontaneously, even automatically.
High road	High-road transfer occurs when the learner consciously and deliberately ("mindfully") evaluates the new situation and applies previous learning to it.
Forward reaching	High-road transfer that is forward reaching occurs when learners think about possible other uses while learning.
Backward reaching	High-road transfer that is backward reaching occurs when learners in a new situation think about previous situations that might apply.

== Teaching for transfer ==
Transfer is less a deliberate activity by the learner than it is a result of the environment at the time of learning. Teachers, being part of the learning environment, can be an instrument of transfer (both positive and negative). Recommendations for teaching for transfer include the hugging and bridging strategies; providing authentic environment and activities within a conceptual framework; encouraging problem-based learning; community of practice; cognitive apprenticeship; and game-based learning.

=== Hugging and bridging ===
Hugging and bridging as techniques for positive transfer were suggested by the research of Perkins and Salomon.

Hugging is when the teacher encourages transfer by incorporating similarities between the learning situation and the future situations in which the learning might be used. Some methods for hugging include simulation games, mental practice, and contingency learning.

Bridging is when the teacher encourages transfer by helping students to find connections between learning and to abstract their existing knowledge to new concepts. Some methods for bridging include brainstorming, developing analogies, and metacognition.

== Related concept in machine learning ==
In machine learning, transfer learning is an analogous phenomenon in which knowledge acquired while training a model on one task, domain or dataset may improve that model's learning or performance on another task, domain or dataset. This is often achieved by pre-training the model on a task for which a large amount of data is available, followed by fine-tuning it on a target task for which a relatively small amount of data is available; this approach is itself often referred to simply as "transfer learning". A related approach is multi-task learning, in which a model is trained on multiple tasks simultaneously and may therefore acquire knowledge that transfers between tasks.

== See also ==
- Affordance
- Analogical reasoning
- Analogy
- Classical conditioning
- Gavriel Salomon
- Instructional scaffolding
- Language transfer
- Metaphor
- Priming (psychology)
- Problem solving
