= Variety (linguistics) =

Specific form of a language or language cluster

In linguistics, a variety, also known as a lect or an isolect, is a specific form of a language or language cluster. This may include languages, dialects, registers, styles, or other forms of language, as well as a standard variety. The use of the word variety to refer to the different forms avoids the use of the term language, which many people associate only with the standard language, and the term dialect, which is often associated with non-standard language forms thought of as less prestigious or "proper" than the standard. Linguists speak of both standard and non-standard (vernacular) varieties as equally complex, valid, and full-fledged forms of language. Lect avoids the problem in ambiguous cases of deciding whether two varieties are distinct languages or dialects of a single language.

Variation at the level of the lexicon, such as slang and argot, is often considered in relation to particular styles or levels of formality (also called registers), but such uses are sometimes discussed as varieties as well.

== Dialects ==
O'Grady et al. define dialect: "A regional or social variety of a language characterized by its own phonological, syntactic, and lexical properties." A variety spoken in a particular region is called a regional dialect (regiolect, geolect); some regional varieties are called regionalects or topolects, especially to discuss varieties of Chinese. In addition, there are varieties associated with particular ethnic groups (sometimes called ethnolects), socioeconomic classes (sometimes called sociolects), or other social or cultural groups.

Dialectology is the study of dialects and their geographic or social distribution. Traditionally, dialectologists study the variety of language used within a particular speech community, a group of people who share a set of norms or conventions for language use.

In order to sidestep the vexing problem of distinguishing dialect from language, some linguists have been using the term communalect – defined as "a neutral term for any speech tradition tied to a specific community". Other linguists, e.g. Lars Johanson, prefer the term "code", as seen in phrases like code-switching and code alternation.

More recently, sociolinguists have adopted the concept of the community of practice, a group of people who develop shared knowledge and shared norms of interaction, as the social group within which dialects develop and change. Sociolinguists Penelope Eckert and Sally McConnell-Ginet explain: "Some communities of practice may develop more distinctive ways of speaking than others. Thus, it is within communities of practice that linguistic influence may spread within and among speech communities."

The words dialect and accent are often used synonymously in everyday speech, but linguists define the two terms differently. Accent generally refers to differences in pronunciation, especially those that are associated with geographic or social differences, whereas dialect refers to differences in grammar and vocabulary as well.

== Standard varieties ==
Many languages have a standard variety, some lect that is selected and promoted prescriptively by either quasi-legal authorities or other social institutions, such as schools or media. Standard varieties are accorded more sociolinguistic prestige than other, nonstandard lects and are generally thought of as "correct" by speakers of the language. Since the selection is an arbitrary standard, standard forms are the "correct" varieties only in the sense that they are tacitly valued by higher socio-economic strata and promoted by public influencers on matters of language use, such as writers, publishers, critics, language teachers, and self-appointed language guardians. As Ralph Harold Fasold puts it, "The standard language may not even be the best possible constellation of linguistic features available. It is general social acceptance that gives us a workable arbitrary standard, not any inherent superiority of the characteristics it specifies."

Sociolinguists generally recognize the standard variety of a language as one of the dialects of that language.

In some cases, an authoritative regulatory body, such as the Académie Française, maintains and codifies the usage norms for a standard variety. More often, though, standards are understood in an implicit, practice-based way. Writing about Standard English, John Algeo suggests that the standard variety "is simply what English speakers agree to regard as good".

Einar Haugen describes the standardization process as having four stages:

1. Selection: A prestigious variety of the language, generally that of the elite, is selected to serve as the standard.
2. Codification: The structure of this variety are recorded, e.g., in dictionaries and grammars.
3. Elaboration: As the language is used in a broader range of contexts, vocabulary and structures are expanded, e.g., through word formation or borrowing.
4. Acceptance: The speech community orients itself toward the standard variety and uses it.

The ideal standard language presents minimal variation in form while maintaining maximal variation in function.

== Registers and styles ==
A register (sometimes called a style) is a variety of language used in a particular social setting. Settings may be defined in terms of greater or lesser formality, or in terms of socially recognized events, such as baby talk, which is used in many western cultures to talk to small children or as a joking register used in teasing or playing The Dozens. There are also registers associated with particular professions or interest groups; jargon refers specifically to the vocabulary associated with such registers.

Unlike dialects, which are used by particular speech communities and associated with geographical settings or social groupings, registers are associated with particular communicative situations, purposes, or levels of formality, and can constitute divisions within a single regional lect or standardized variety. Dialect and register may thus be thought of as different dimensions of linguistic variation. For example, Trudgill suggests the following sentence as an example of a nonstandard dialect that is used with the technical register of physical geography:

There was two eskers what we saw in them U-shaped valleys.

Most speakers command a range of registers, which they use in different situations. The choice of register is affected by the setting and topic of speech, as well as the relationship that exists between the speakers.

The appropriate form of language may also change during the course of a communicative event as the relationship between speakers changes, or different social facts become relevant. Speakers may shift styles, as their perception of an event in progress changes. Consider the following telephone call to the Embassy of Cuba in Washington, DC.

Caller: ¿Es la embajada de Cuba? (Is this the Cuban embassy?)
Receptionist: Sí. Dígame. (Yes, may I help you?)
Caller: Es Rosa. (It's Rosa.)
Receptionist: ¡Ah Rosa! ¿Cóma anda eso? (Oh, Rosa! How's it going?)

At first, the receptionist uses a relatively formal register, as befits her professional role. After the caller identifies herself, the receptionist recognizes that she is speaking to a friend, and she shifts to an informal register of colloquial Cuban Spanish. The shift is similar to metaphorical code-switching, but since it involves styles or registers, it is considered an example of style-shifting.

== Idiolect ==
An idiolect is a language variety typical of an individual person. A person's idiolect may be affected by contact with various regional or social dialects, professional registers and, in the case of multilinguals, various languages.

For scholars who view language from the perspective of linguistic competence, essentially the knowledge of language and grammar that exists in the mind of a single language user is the idiolect. For scholars who regard language as a shared social practice, the idiolect is more like a dialect with a speech community of one person.

== See also ==
- Abstand and ausbau languages
- Language localization
- List of language subsystems
- Koiné language, a standard language or dialect that arises due to contact between mutually intelligible varieties (dialects) of the same language
