= Gavriel Salomon =

Israeli educational psychologist

- גבריאל סלומון
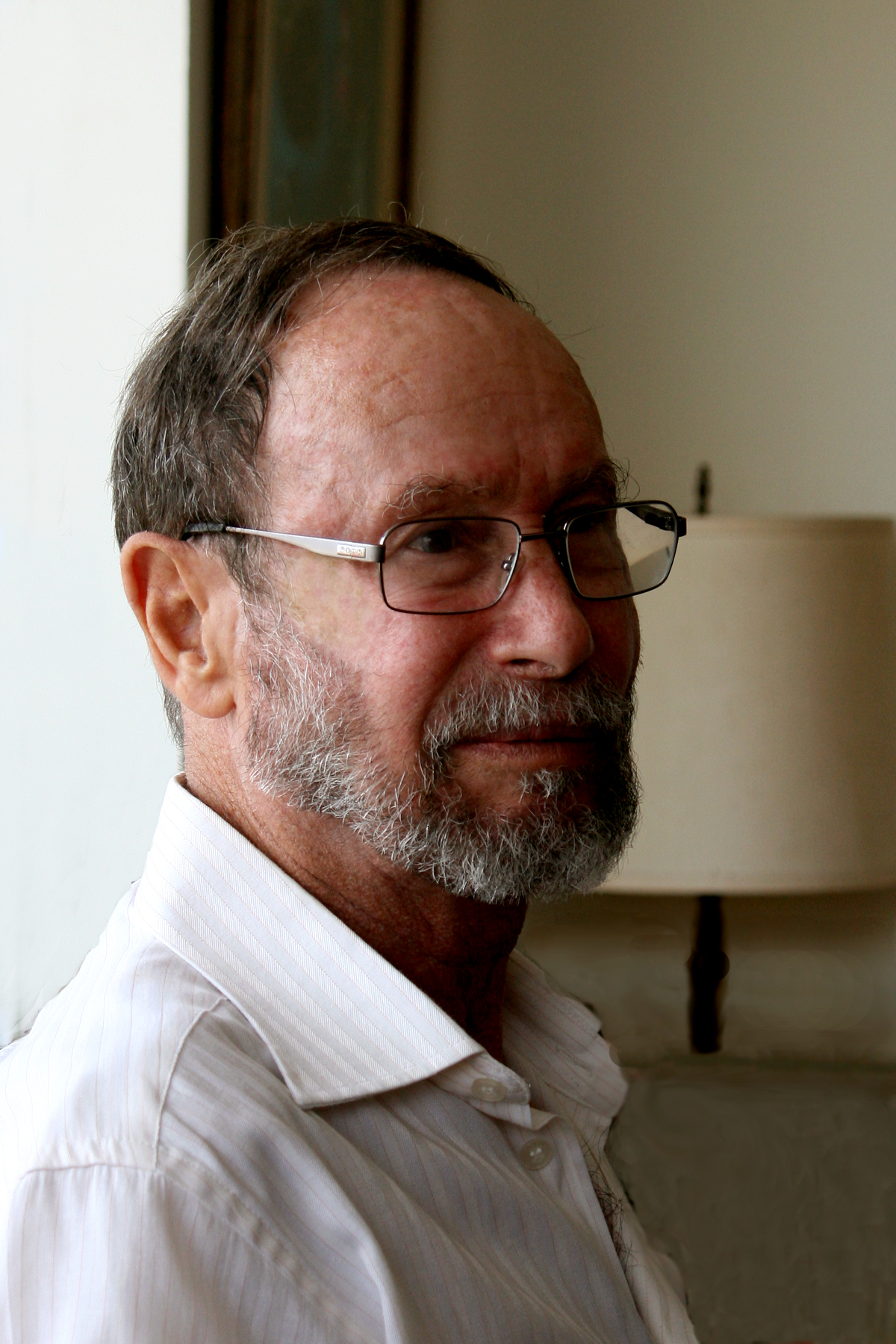
- Salomon in 2006
- Born: 12 October 1938
- Died: 4 January 2016 (aged 77)
- Education: Stanford University
- Known for: mindful transfer of learning
- Scientific career
- Fields: Educational psychology
- Workplaces: University of Haifa

Gavriel Salomon (Hebrew: גבריאל סלומון; October 1938 – January 2016) was an Israeli educational psychologist who conducted research on cognition and instruction. He was a Professor Emeritus in the department of education at the University of Haifa.

== Career ==
He served as the Editor in Chief of the Educational Psychologist.

Salomon conducted research on the relationship between media and learning, with particular focus on television and computer technologies. He also studied the concept of transfer of learning—how skills and knowledge acquired in one context apply to another.

At the University of Haifa, he served as Dean of the Faculty of Education and founded the Center for Research on Peace Education. His work in peace education included initiatives involving Israeli and Palestinian educators and students.

In addition to academic publications, Salomon contributed to discussions on education policy in Israel, especially in areas related to media literacy and technology in education.

== Awards and honours ==
- In 2001, he received the Israel Prize, for education
- He also received the Sylvia Scribner Award from the American Educational Research Association He was awarded an honorary doctorate from the University of Oulu in Finland for his work in education research.

Salomon died in January 2016.

== See also ==
- List of Israel Prize recipients
