= One person, one language =

Linguistic parenting method

The “one person, one language” approach is a popular method adopted by parents attempting to raise simultaneous bilingual children. With the “one person, one language” approach, each parent consistently speaks only one of the two languages to the child. For instance, the child's mother might speak to them exclusively in French, while the father might use only English.

== Reasoning ==
Traditionally, the “one person, one language” method has been regarded as the best method for bilingual language acquisition free of mixed utterances. The term “one person, one language” was first introduced by the French linguist Maurice Grammont in 1902. He theorized that by separating the languages from the beginning, parents could prevent confusion and code-mixing in their bilingual children.

George Saunders wrote in his book Bilingual Children: From Birth to Teens that the “one person, one language” approach “ensures that the children have regular exposure to and have to make use of each language. This is particularly important for the minority language, which has little outside support."

This method has also been linked to an early development of metalinguistic awareness.

== Implementation ==
In a 1989 study published in the Infant Mental Health Journal, Naomi Goodz found that fathers tend to adhere more strictly to the “one person, one language model" than mothers. Even when parents reported strictly following a “one person, one language” scheme, naturalistic observations found repeated instances of language mixing in both parents in a 1996 study

Masae Takeuchi conducted research on 25 Japanese mothers in Melbourne, Australia who were using the one person, one language approach to support their children's Japanese/English bilingual development. Takeuchi found that consistency is the key to the success of the approach. Most of the children in Takeuchi's study did not end up using Japanese actively after leaving school and only those children who were raised by mothers who consistently insisted on speaking only Japanese went on to use Japanese actively as adults.

== Alternatives ==
Alternatives to "one person, one language" (OPOL) are "minority language at home" (ML@H), "time and place" (T&L = specific language for specific time and/or place), "mixed language policy" (MLP = mixing languages depending on situation, topic, etc.), and individual family-based models.

== See also ==
=== Compare ===
- Bilingual education, schooling in two languages simultaneously
- Language immersion, school in the target language only
