= List of language subsystems =

In linguistics, languages are often studied in terms of seven major subsystems, which relate to major subfields within linguistics. In addition, particular subfields of linguistic inquiry may divide their subject matter into more specific subsystems. This list contains links to commonly studied language subsystems.

== Major subsystems ==
Linguists recognize seven major language subsystems:

- Phonetics, the sounds of human speech, including their physiological production, acoustic properties, auditory perception, and neurophysiological status;
- Phonology, the systematic use of sound to encode meaning in any spoken human language (natural language or constructed language);
- Morphology, the structure of meaningful units of a language, such as words and affixes;
- Lexicology, the study of words;
- Syntax, the principles and rules for constructing phrases, clauses, and the like in human languages;
- Semantics, the meaningful content of words, sentences, or other language elements; and
- Pragmatics, the ways in which context contributes to meaning in natural language use.

This division varies among linguists and authors. For example, phonetics and phonology are occasionally merged into one subsystem. Morphology and lexicology can also be merged.

== Sociolinguistics ==
- The term variety in sociolinguistics is used as a cover term for dialects, registers, and other forms of language, including standard languages.
  - Dialect refers to a variety that is used by a particular group of speakers.
  - Accent refers to a specific system of pronunciation.
  - Idiolect refers to the variety that is used by an individual speaker.
  - Register or style refer to a variety that is used in a particular setting or for a particular purpose.
  - Standard language is a variety promoted by some social group, either officially or unofficially, as the preferred form.
- Abstand and ausbau languages are concepts developed by sociolinguists to describe related language varieties, ranging from dialects of a single language to distinct languages.
