= Negative transfer (memory) =

In psychology, when old knowledge interferes with new knowledge

In behavioral psychology, negative transfer is the interference of the previous knowledge with new learning, where one set of events could hurt performance on related tasks. It is also a pattern of error in animal learning and behavior. It occurs when a learned, previously adaptive response to one stimulus interferes with the acquisition of an adaptive response to a novel stimulus that is similar to the first.

== Example ==
A common example is switching from a manual transmission vehicle to an automatic transmission vehicle. The adaptive response series in a standard vehicle when it reaches 10 miles per hour is to step on the clutch, shift gears, and step on the accelerator. This previously adaptive response is incompatible with the proper response in an automatic transmission, confirming how prior experience can limit the ability to function efficiently in new settings.

An elementary example of transfer learning would be, for example, in dealing with subject–verb agreement: When you have a singular subject you have to add an "s" on the end of the verb and when you have a plural subject you do not put an "s" on the end of the verb. However, when they are the subjects "I" and "You", they do not follow this rule. Therefore, if students take the previously learned lesson of subject–verb agreement and have not learned the exception properly they are going to be adding "s" on the end of the verbs in their sentences, which is incorrect. This is an example of negative transfer because they have taken what they have learned from one set of rules and have applied it to a similar experience but in the wrong way.

== Relation to positive transfer ==
Negative transfer can also correspond with positive transfer and the errors that come with negative transfer can sometimes be made at faster rates. Although positive transfer is more likely than negative transfer, error rates can be much higher when negative transfer does occur than if no previously learned behavior had existed.

For example, if a mariner already knows how to operate navigation equipment and if negative transfer occurs, he may display more errors while learning to operate new equipment than a mariner who has never operated navigation equipment. This is because the old mariner is using previous knowledge that may have transferred negatively and now is having to forget the prior inaccurate knowledge and try to learn new equipment the correct way. This is because the learning that was transferred can not properly apply to the new experience. Another example of this might be the way an experience of the same kind has different protocol for different situations. If a mariner has already learned how to quickly react to an alarm, the same mariner may react to the same alarm on new equipment even more quickly (positive transfer on reaction time) than without already knowing how to react. Although the reaction may happen very quickly, it may be to push the wrong alarm switch located in the same position as the old alarm switch (negative transfer on error rate). In essence, the old behavior contributes to making errors at a faster rate on the new behavior.

== AB-AC list learning ==
A common test for negative transfer is the AB-AC list learning paradigm from the verbal learning research of the 1950s and 1960s. In this paradigm, two lists of paired associates are learned in succession, and if the second set of associations (List 2) constitutes a modification of the first set of associations (List 1), negative transfer results and thus the learning rate of the second list is slower than the first list.

== Preventing negative transfer ==
Studies have shown that not only by reevaluating the situation and its errors but by comparing them to others who have attempted the same task allows for deeper insight into how to correct ones ability or knowledge of a situation. By having the ability to compare oneself to another individuals performance adjustments can be better internalized and negative effects can be calculated and seen before they are even made. This allows for the error rate to slow down with the positive transfer rate to increase. When applying what has been learned to another similar task, one can now take what has been learned along with the comparisons of what others have accomplished and apply it more accurately. It would almost be like getting five chances to learn from one exercise when in actuality you only attempted it once.

According to research done by Magda Osman, without external normative standards, such as making a comparison with another's learning experiences, self-perceptions of the knowledge and control ability of self-conditions lead to negative self-assessments. Moreover, along with poor self-efficacy judgments, individuals also undervalued the relevancy of previously gained knowledge in assisting them in the transfer task. The reason for this is because individuals overcompensate in their error detection and correction, which leads them to ignore rather than transfer relevant prior information. As a consequence this has negative effects on their performance because they have failed to utilize prior relevant knowledge.

Remember to consider the negative learnings that can transfer over from prior experiences when introducing something new. Address the negatives to help extinguish the error rates that might occur. Luckily, while negative transfer is a real and often problematic phenomenon of learning, it is of much less concern to education than positive transfer. Negative transfer typically causes trouble only in the early stages of learning a new domain. With experience, learners correct for the effects of negative transfer.

== See also ==
- Educational psychology
- Interference theory
- Language transfer
- Learning
- Memory
- Transfer of learning
