= Threshold hypothesis =

Theory concerning second language acquisition

The threshold hypothesis is a hypothesis concerning second language acquisition set forth in a study by Jim Cummins (1976), which states that a minimum threshold in language proficiency must be reached in both languages before a second-language speaker can reap the cognitive benefits of being bilingual. It also states that, in order to gain proficiency in a second language, the learner must also have passed a certain and age appropriate level of competence in his or her first language.
