= Metalinguistic awareness =

Ability to consciously reflect on the nature of language

Metalinguistic awareness, also known as metalinguistic ability, refers to the ability to consciously reflect on the nature of language and to use metalanguage to describe it. The concept of metalinguistic awareness is helpful in explaining the execution and transfer of linguistic knowledge across languages (e.g. code-switching as well as translation among bilinguals). Metalinguistics expresses itself in ways such as:

- an awareness that language has the potential to go beyond the literal meaning, to further include multiple or implied meanings, formal structures like phonemes, syntax, etc.
- an awareness, therefore, of the flexibility of language through irony, sarcasm and other forms of word play
- an awareness, therefore, too, that language has a structure that can be manipulated
- an awareness that a word is separable from its referent (meaning resides in the mind, not in the name, i.e. Sonia is Sonia, and I will be the same person even if somebody calls me another name)

Metalinguistic awareness is therefore distinct from the notion of engaging with normal language operations, but instead with the process of language use and the exercise of the relevant control.

Currently, the most commonly held conception of metalinguistic awareness suggests that its development is constituted by cognitive control (i.e. selecting and coordinating the relevant pieces of information needed to comprehend the language manipulation) and analysed knowledge (i.e. recognising the meaning and structure of the manipulated language).

== Background ==
=== Origins ===
There are a number of explanations as to where metalinguistic abilities may come from.

One such explanation depends on the notion that metalinguistic ability is developed in tandem with language acquisition, specifically pertaining to spoken language. The development of mechanisms that allow for an individual to detect errors as they speak is, by this account, a manifestation of metalinguistic ability.

Another possible account suggests that metalinguistic awareness and metalinguistic ability are distinct from other sorts of linguistic developments, where these metalinguistic skills are entirely separate from the development and acquisition of basic speaking and listening skills. By this account, metalinguistic abilities necessarily differ from linguistic proficiency.

A third possible account suggests that metalinguistic awareness occurs as a result of language education in schools – this account holds that it is the process of learning to read that nurtures metalinguistic ability.

=== Later developments ===
Today, the most widely accepted notion of the development of metalinguistic awareness is a framework that suggests it can be achieved through the development of two dimensions: analysed knowledge and cognitive control. As opposed to knowing that is intuitive, analysed knowledge refers to "knowing that is explicit and objective". Cognitive control involves "the selection and coordination of information, usually within time constraint".

In a given proposition, a sentence with wordplay, for instance, metalinguistic awareness plays out in several steps. One has to control selecting and coordinating the relevant information in that proposition, and then analyse the information as it is represented to decipher it.

Bialystok and Ryan argue that achieving metalinguistic awareness is the ability to manipulate both dimensions at an arbitrarily "high" level. In the study of metalinguistic ability in children, the proportional growth of these two dimensions suggests that there may not be a fixed age of onset to trace or measure metalinguistic ability, but rather an emerging proficiency that follows increasingly difficult metalinguistic issues.

== Types of metalinguistic awareness ==
There are four major categories to metalinguistic awareness, where this notion of metalinguistic ability may manifest. These categories are: phonological awareness, word awareness, syntactic awareness and pragmatic awareness.

=== Phonological awareness and word awareness ===
Phonological awareness and word awareness work in tandem in order to allow the language user to process, understand, and utilize the constituent parts of the language being used. These forms of metalinguistic awareness are of particular relevance in the process of learning how to read. Phonological awareness may be assessed through the use of phonemic segmentation tasks, though the use of tests utilizing nondigraph, nonword syllables appear to provide more accurate results.

=== Syntactic awareness ===
Syntactic awareness is engaged when an individual engages in mental operations to do with structural aspects of language. This involves the application of inferential and pragmatic rules. This may be measured through the use of correction tasks for sentences that contain word order violations.

=== Pragmatic awareness ===
Pragmatic awareness refers to the awareness of the relationships between sentences and their contextual/relational quality. This may include the epistemic context, knowledge of the situation, or any other details surrounding the utterance. This may be measured by assessing the ability to detect inconsistencies between sentences.

== Correlations with other linguistic fields ==
Past research has attempted to find correlations between the attainment of metalinguistic ability with other language abilities like literacy and bilingualism. However, the paradigm shifted with the idea that metalinguistic ability had to instead be measured through essential underlying skills (i.e. analysed knowledge and cognitive control). This framework – analysing ability through comparing it with skills rather than comparing it with other abilities – came to be applied to other linguistic abilities that bore the need for similar skills.

=== Literacy ===
The process of learning to read depends heavily on analysed knowledge on the functions and features of reading, control over the knowledge required and control over the formal aspects of the language to extract its meaning. Various research has exhibited that weaknesses in any one of these aspects reflects poorer literacy. As such, there suggests a relationship between literacy and metalinguistic awareness.

Separate studies also suggest that the process of learning how to read is strongly influenced by aptitude with metalinguistic factors. In fact, older, literate children often prove to be more adept with metalinguistic skills. It is suggested, though, that the relation may be reversed in that it is improved metalinguistic skill that leads to an improved ability to read, rather than reading that precipitates an improvement in metalinguistic ability.

=== Bilingualism ===
Studies have generally supported the hypothesis that bilingual children possess greater cognitive control than their monolingual counterparts. These studies are conducted with the caveat that monolingual and bilingual children being assessed have, as a baseline, equal competency in the languages that they speak. This would suggest that the differences in performance are to do with a difference in metalinguistic ability rather than differences in linguistic proficiency.

When assessing ability, bilingual children were privileged in their advanced awareness of the arbitrary relationship between words and their meanings, as well as that of structures and meanings. This advanced awareness could be manifested in the transferability of the idea that language is malleable, across languages. Interestingly, studies seemed to show that bilingual children had higher proficiency in their metalinguistic skills than in the languages themselves.
