= Jacquelyn Schachter =

Linguist

Jacquelyn E. Schachter (September 21, 1936 – October 22, 2011) was professor emerita of linguistics at the University of Oregon. She received her Ph.D. in 1971 from UCLA, with a dissertation entitled, "Presuppositional and Counterfactual Conditional Sentences."

== Career ==
Schachter taught at the University of Southern California from 1971 to 1991 before taking up a position at the University of Oregon in 1991. At Oregon she was the Director of the American English Institute and a Linguistics Department faculty until she retired in 1999.

== Research ==
Schachter's primary research field was second language acquisition (SLA), investigating the role of Universal Grammar in conditioning patterns of SLA. Her work showed a lasting concern with methodological issues in second language research. (See e.g. Schachter 1998). She also had research interests in cognitive neuroscience and psycholinguistics.

Schachter contributed to the fields of TESOL and SLA by coediting two important volumes of readings, Robinett and Schachter (1983) and Gass and Schachter (1989). In addition, she edited a book series for Lawrence Erlbaum Associates entitled Second Language Acquisition Research: Theoretical and Methodological Issues.

She was the editor of the conference proceedings for the international TESOL conferences of 1978–80 and the editor of the TESOL Quarterly from June 1978 to 1982.

One of her daughters, Jana DeMeire, was lost in the crash of Swissair Flight 111 in 1998.

== Selected publications ==
- Gass, Susan M. and Jacquelyn Schachter, eds. 1989. Linguistic Perspectives on Second Language Acquisition. Cambridge University Press.
- Robinett, Betty Wallace and Jacquelyn Schachter, eds.. 1983. Second Language Learning: Contrastive Analysis, Error Analysis, and Related Aspects. Ann Arbor, MI: University of Michigan Press.
- Schachter, Jacquelyn. 1974. An error in error analysis. Language Learning 24, 205–214.
- Schachter, Jacquelyn. 1988. Second Language Acquisition and Its Relationship to Universal Grammar. Applied Linguistics 9, 219–235.
- Schachter, Jacquelyn. 1998. Recent research in Language Learning Studies: Promises and Problems. Language Learning 48, 557–583.
