= Language transfer =

Influence one language has on the acquisition or intelligibility of another

Language transfer is the application of linguistic features from one language to another by a bilingual or multilingual speaker and may occur across both languages in the acquisition of a simultaneous bilingual. It may also occur from a mature speaker's first language (L1) to a second language (L2) they are acquiring, or from an L2 back to the L1. Language transfer (also known as L1 interference, linguistic interference, and crosslinguistic influence) is most commonly discussed in the context of English language learning and teaching, but it can occur in any situation when someone does not have a native-level command of any target language, as when translating into a second language. Language transfer is also a common topic in bilingual child language acquisition as it occurs frequently in bilingual children especially when one language is dominant.

== Types of language transfer ==
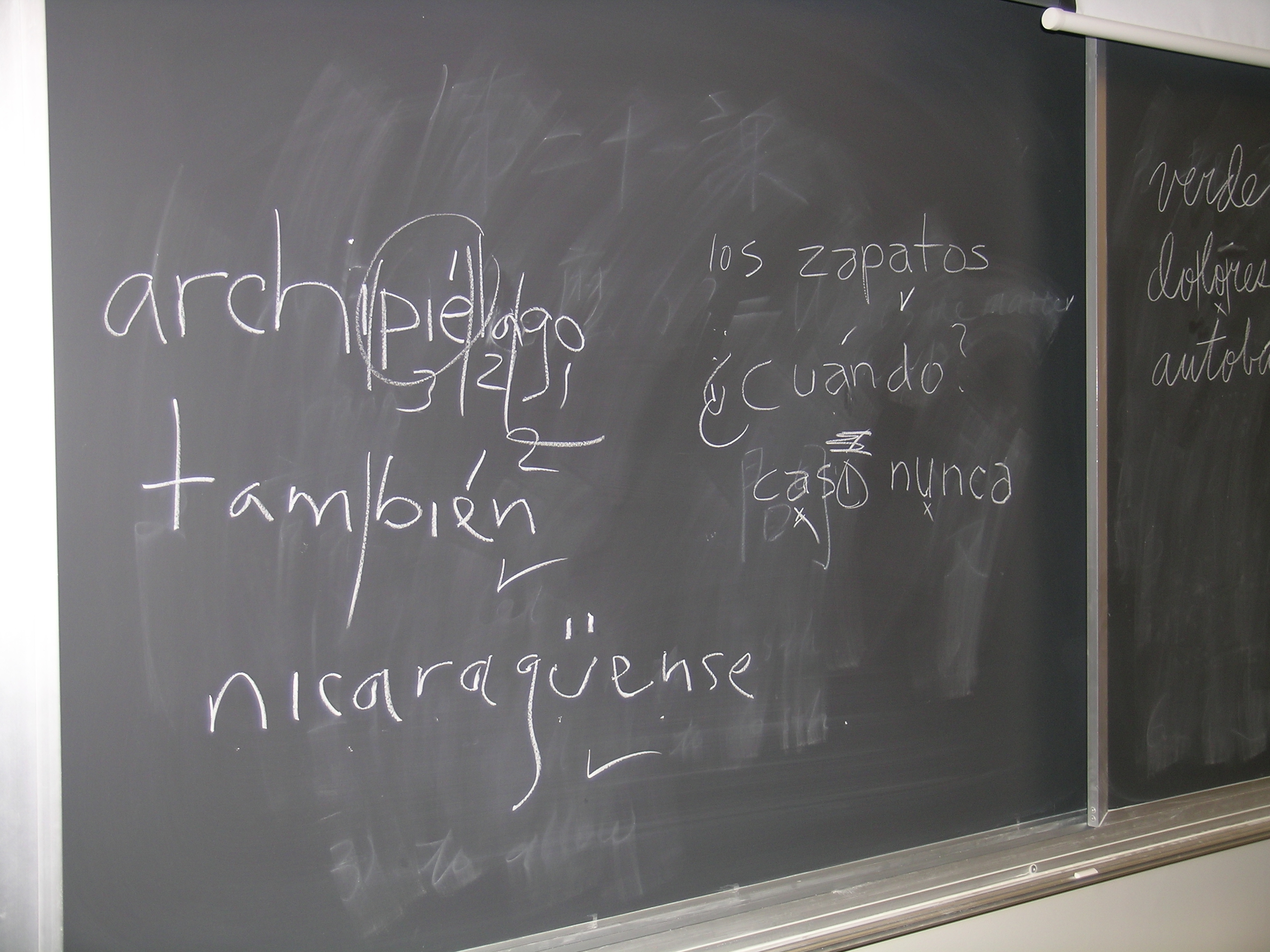
Blackboard in Harvard classroom shows students' efforts at placing the ü and acute accent diacritics used in Spanish orthography.

When the relevant unit or structure of both languages is the same, linguistic interference can result in correct language production called positive transfer: here, the "correct" meaning is in line with most native speakers' notions of acceptability. An example is the use of cognates. However, language interference is most often discussed as a source of errors known as negative transfer, which can occur when speakers and writers transfer items and structures that are not the same in both languages.

=== Negative transfer ===
Within the theory of contrastive analysis, the systematic study of a pair of languages with a view to identifying their structural differences and similarities, the greater the differences between the two languages, the more negative transfer can be expected. For example, in English, a preposition is used before a day of the week: "I'm going to the beach on Friday." In Spanish, instead of a preposition the definite article is used: Voy a la playa el viernes. Novice Spanish students who are native English-speakers may produce a transfer error and use a preposition when it is not necessary because of their reliance on English. According to Whitley, it is natural for students to make such errors based on how the English words are used. Another typical example of negative transfer concerns German students trying to learn English, despite being part of the same Germanic language family. Since the German noun Information can also be used in the plural – Informationen – German students will almost invariably use informations in English, too, which would break the rules of uncountable nouns.

From a more general standpoint, Brown mentions "all new learning involves transfer based on previous learning". That could also explain why initial learning of L1 will impact L2 acquisition.

=== Positive transfer ===
The results of positive transfer go largely unnoticed and so are less often discussed. Nonetheless, such results can have an observable effect. Generally speaking, the more similar the two languages are and the more the learner is aware of the relation between them, the more positive transfer will occur. For example, an Anglophone learner of German may correctly guess an item of German vocabulary from its English counterpart, but word order, phonetics, connotations, collocation, and other language features are more likely to differ. That is why such an approach has the disadvantage of making the learner more subject to the influence of "false friends", words that seem similar between languages but differ significantly in meaning. This influence is especially common among learners who misjudge the relation between languages or mainly rely on visual learning.

In addition to positive transfer potentially resulting in correct language production and negative transfer resulting in errors, there is some evidence that any transfer from the first language can result in a kind of technical, or analytical, advantage over native (monolingual) speakers of a language. For example, L2 speakers of English whose first language is Korean have been found to be more accurate with perception of unreleased stops in English than native English speakers who are functionally monolingual because of the different status of unreleased stops in Korean from English. That "native-language transfer benefit" appears to depend on an alignment of properties in the first and the second languages that favors the linguistic biases of the first language, rather than simply the perceived similarities between two languages.

== Conscious and unconscious transfer ==
Language transfer may be conscious or unconscious. Consciously, learners or unskilled translators may sometimes guess when producing speech or text in a second language because they have not learned or have forgotten its proper usage. Unconsciously, they may not realize that the structures and internal rules of the languages in question are different. Such users could also be aware of both the structures and internal rules, yet be insufficiently skilled to put them into practice, and consequently often fall back on their first language. The unconscious aspect to language transfer can be demonstrated in the case of the so-called "transfer-to-nowhere" principle put forward by Eric Kellerman, which addressed language based on its conceptual organization instead of its syntactic features. Here, language determines how the speaker conceptualizes experience, with the principle describing the process as an unconscious assumption that is subject to between-language variation. Kellerman explained that it is difficult for learners to acquire the construal patterns of a new language because "learners may not look for the perspectives peculiar to the [target/L2] language; instead they may seek the linguistic tools which will permit them to maintain their L1 perspective."

The conscious transfer of language, on the other hand, can be illustrated in the principle developed by Roger Andersen called "transfer-to-somewhere," which holds that "a language structure will be susceptible to transfer only if it is compatible with natural acquisitional principles or is perceived to have similar counterpart (a somewhere to transfer to) in the recipient language." This is interpreted as a heuristic designed to make sense of the target language input by assuming a form of awareness on the part of the learner to map L1 onto the L2. An analogy that can describe the differences between the Kellerman's and Anderson's principles is that the former is concerned with the conceptualization that fuels the drive towards discovering the means of linguistic expression whereas Andersen's focused on the acquisition of those means.

== Acceleration and deceleration ==
The theories of acceleration and deceleration are bilingual child language acquisition theories based on the known norms of monolingual acquisition. These theories come from comparisons of bilingual children's acquisition to that of their monolingual peers of similar backgrounds.

Acceleration is a process similar to that of bootstrapping, where a child acquiring language uses knowledge and skills from one language to aid in, and speed up their acquisition of the other language.

Deceleration is a process in which a child experiences negative effects (more mistakes and slower language learning) on their language acquisition due to interference from their other language.

== Literacy development ==
Language transfer is often referred to as cross-language transfer, the ability to use skills acquired in one language and to use those skills to facilitate learning of a new language. Cross-language transfer has been researched and analyzed by many scholars over the years, but the focus on cross-language transfer in literacy research expanded in the 1990s. It is a topic that has been gaining lots of interest from scholars due to the increasing number of bilingual and multilingual people, especially students, around the world. In the USA alone, English Language Learners (ELL) account for over 10% of the students enrolled in public schools.

The linguistic interdependence hypothesis claims that language transfer can occur from L1 (first language) to L2 (second language), but there first must be a level of proficiency in L1 literacy skills for the skills to transfer over into L2. In other words, there must be some prior knowledge of literacy skills in L1 to assist with acquiring literacy skills in L2. The acquisition of L2 literacy skills can be facilitated and gained with greater ease by having more time, access, and experience with L1 literary skills. Over time, through formal exposure and practice with literacy skills, L2 learners have been able to catch up with their monolingual peers. However, literacy skills acquired in L2 can also be used to assist with literacy skills in L1 because cross-language transfer is bidirectional.

Most studies have indicated that literacy cross-language transfer can occur regardless of the L1 and the L2 languages, but Chung et al. (2012) state that cross-language transfer is less likely to occur when the languages do not share similar orthography systems. For example, using literacy skills acquired in English may be accessed and used with more ease in Spanish because English and Spanish follow similar orthography (they both use alphabets based on Latin), whereas using literacy skills acquired in English to facilitate ease of learning Korean would be more difficult because those languages do not follow a similar orthography system (English uses the English alphabet, and Korean uses the Korean alphabet).

Cross-language transfer can also occur with deaf bilinguals who use sign language and read written words. The sign language and oral/written language used in a region are separate languages; American Sign Language (ASL) and English, for example, are distinct languages. According to the National Institute on Deafness and Other Communications Disorders, "ASL is a language completely separate and distinct from English. It contains all the fundamental features of language, with its own rules for pronunciation, word formation, and word order". Because sign languages are considered to be their own language, most deaf people are considered to be bilingual because they speak in one language (sign language) and read in another (English, Spanish, Arabic, etc.).

== In comprehension ==
Transfer can also occur in polyglot individuals when comprehending verbal utterances or written language. For instance, German and English both have relative clauses with a noun-noun-verb (=NNV) order but which are interpreted differently in both languages:

German example: Das Mädchen, das die Frau küsst, ist blond

If translated word for word with word order maintained, this German relative clause is equivalent to

English example: The girl that (or whom) the woman is kissing is blonde.

The German and the English examples differ in that in German the subject role can be taken by das Mädchen 'the girl' or die Frau 'the woman', while in the English example only the second noun phrase the woman can be the subject. In short, because German singular feminine and neuter articles exhibit the same inflected form for the accusative as for the nominative case, the German example is syntactically ambiguous in that either the girl or the woman may be doing the kissing. In the English example, both word-order rules and the test of substituting a relative pronoun with different nominative and accusative case markings (e.g. whom/who*) reveal that only the woman can be doing the kissing.

The ambiguity of the German NNV relative clause structure becomes obvious in cases where the assignment of subject and object role is disambiguated. This can be because of case marking if one of the nouns is grammatically male as in Der Mann, den die Frau küsst... 'The man that the woman is kissing...' vs. Der Mann, der die Frau küsst 'The man that is kissing the woman...' because in German the male definite article marks the accusative case. The syntactic ambiguity of the German example also becomes obvious in the case of semantic disambiguation. For instance in Das Eis, das die Frau isst... 'The ice cream that the woman is eating...' and Die Frau, die das Eis isst... 'The woman that is eating the ice cream...' only die Frau 'the woman' is a plausible subject.

Because in English relative clauses with a noun-noun-verb structure (as in the example above) the first noun can only be the object, native speakers of English who speak German as a second language are likelier to interpret ambiguous German NNV relative clauses as object relative clauses (= object-subject-verb order) than German native speakers who prefer an interpretation in which the first noun phrase is the subject (subject-object-verb order). This is because they have transferred their parsing preference from their first language, English, to their second language, German.

== Broader effects ==
With sustained or intense contact between native and non-native speakers, the results of language transfer in the non-native speakers can extend to and affect the speech production of the native-speaking community. For example, in North America, speakers of English whose first language is Spanish or French may have a certain influence on native English speakers' use of language when the native speakers are in the minority. Locations where this phenomenon occurs frequently include Québec, Canada, and predominantly Spanish-speaking regions in the US. For details on the latter, see the map of the Hispanophone world and the list of U.S. communities with Hispanic majority populations. The process of translation can also lead to a hybrid text, which is the mixing of language either at the level of linguistic codes or at the level of cultural or historical references.

== See also ==
- Calque
- Code-switching
- Contrastive rhetoric
- Interlanguage
- Language contact
- Language learning misconceptions
- Loanword
- Macaronic language
- Mixed language
- Multi-competence
- Native-language identification
- Phono-semantic matching
- Ponglish
- Second language acquisition
- Sprachbund
- Translation
