= Language education =

Process and practice of acquiring a language

Language education refers to the processes and practices of teaching a second or foreign language. Its study reflects interdisciplinary approaches, usually including some applied linguistics. There are four main learning categories for language education: communicative competencies, proficiencies, cross-cultural experiences, and multiple literacies.

== Need ==
Increasing globalization has created a great need for people in the workforce who can communicate in multiple languages. Common languages are used in areas such as trade, tourism, diplomacy, technology, media, translation, interpretation and science. Many countries, such as Korea (Kim Yeong-seo, 2009), Japan (Kubota, 1998), and China (Kirkpatrick & Zhichang, 2002), frame education policies to teach at least one foreign language at the primary and secondary school levels. Further, the governments of some countries have more than one official language; such countries include India, Singapore, Malaysia, Pakistan, and the Philippines. According to the GAO (2010), China has recently been placing greater emphasis on foreign language learning, especially English.

== History ==
=== Ancient to medieval period ===
Ancient learners seem to have started by reading, memorizing, and reciting little stories and dialogues that provided basic vocabulary and grammar in naturalistic contexts. These texts seem to have emphasized coherence rather than isolated sentences, such as those modern learners often practice. They covered topics such as getting dressed in the morning (and how to manage the enslaved people who helped with that task), going to school (and evading punishment for not having been there yesterday), visiting a sick friend (and how to find an individual unit in a Roman apartment block), trading insults (and how to concede a fight graciously), or getting a new job (a piece of cake if you have studied with me, an ancient teacher assured his students mendaciously). The texts were presented bilingually in two narrow columns, the language you were learning on the left and the one you already knew on the right, with the columns matching line for line: Each line was effectively a glossary, while each column was a text.

Although the need to learn foreign languages is almost as old as human history itself, the origins of modern language education are in the study and teaching of Latin in the 17th century. In the Ancient Near East, Akkadian was the language of diplomacy, as in the Amarna letters. For many centuries, Latin had been the dominant language of education, commerce, religion, and government in much of the Western world. By the end of the 16th century, it had largely been displaced by French, Italian, and English. John Amos Comenius was one of many people who tried to reverse this trend. He composed a complete course for learning Latin, covering the entire school curriculum, culminating in his Opera Didactica Omnia (1657).

In this work, Comenius also outlined his theory of language acquisition. He is one of the first theorists to write systematically about how languages are learned and about pedagogical methodology for language acquisition. He held that language acquisition must be allied with sensation and experience. Teaching must be oral. The schoolroom should have models of things, and failing that, pictures of them. As a result, he also published the world's first illustrated children's book, Orbis sensualium pictus. The study of Latin diminished from a study of a living language to be used in the real world to a subject in the school curriculum. Such a decline brought about a new justification for its study. It was then claimed that the study of Latin developed intellectual ability, and the study of Latin grammar became an end in and of itself.

"Grammar schools" from the 16th to 18th centuries focused on teaching the grammatical aspects of Classical Latin. Advanced students continued their grammar study by adding rhetoric.

=== 18th century ===
The study of modern languages did not become part of the curriculum of European schools until the 18th century. Based on the purely academic study of Latin, students of modern languages did much the same, studying grammatical rules and translating abstract sentences. Oral work was minimal, and students were instead required to memorize grammatical rules and apply these to decode written texts in the target language. This tradition-inspired method became known as the grammar-translation method.

=== 19th and 20th centuries ===
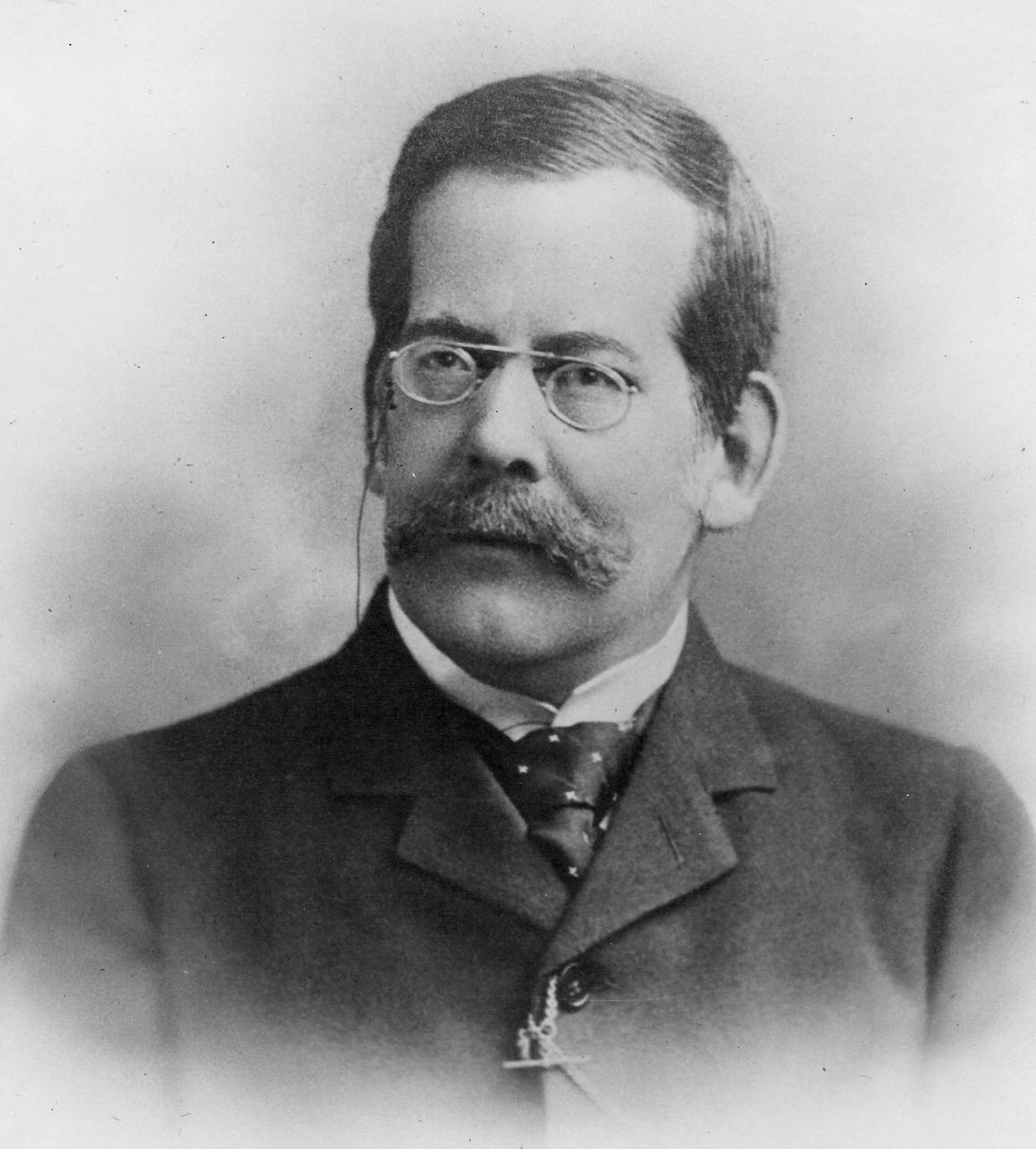
Henry Sweet was a key figure in establishing the applied linguistics tradition in language teaching.

Innovation in foreign language teaching began in the 19th century and accelerated in the 20th century. It led to many different, sometimes conflicting methods, each claiming to be a major improvement over previous or contemporary methods. The earliest applied linguists included Jean Manesca, Heinrich Gottfried Ollendorff (1803–1865), Henry Sweet (1845–1912), Otto Jespersen (1860–1943), and Harold Palmer (1877–1949). They worked on establishing language-teaching principles and approaches grounded in linguistic and psychological theories, but they left many practical details for others to develop.

The history of foreign-language education in the 20th century and the methods of teaching (such as those related below) might appear to be a history of failure. Very few students in U.S. universities who major in a foreign language attain "minimum professional proficiency." Even the "reading knowledge" required for a PhD degree is comparable only to that of second-year language students, and very few native English-speaking researchers can read and assess information written in languages other than English.

However, anecdotal evidence of successful second or foreign language learning is easy to find, creating a discrepancy with the failure of many language education programs. This tends to make the research of second-language acquisition emotionally charged. Older methods and approaches, such as the grammar translation method and the direct method, may be dismissed and even ridiculed as newer methods and approaches are invented and promoted as solutions to the problem of high failure rates among foreign language students.

Some books on language teaching describe various methods used in the past and conclude with the author's new method. These methods may reflect the author's views, and such presentations may downplay the relationships between old and new methods. For example, descriptive linguists seem to claim that there were no scientifically-based language teaching methods before their work (which led to the audio-lingual method developed for the U.S. Army in World War II). However, there is significant evidence to the contrary.

Authors may also state that older methods were completely ineffective or have died out. In reality, even the oldest methods are still in use (e.g., the Berlitz version of the direct method). Proponents of new methods have been so sure that their ideas are new and correct that they could not conceive that the older ones have enough validity to provoke controversy. This, in turn, was caused by an emphasis on new scientific advances, which has tended to blind researchers to precedents in older work. There have been two major branches in the field of language learning: the empirical and the theoretical. These have critically separate histories, with each gaining prominence at one time or another. The rivalry between the two camps is intense, with little communication or cooperation.

Examples of scholars on the empiricist side include Jespersen, Palmer, and Leonard Bloomfield, who promoted mimicry and memorization through pattern drills. These methods follow from the basic empiricist position that language acquisition results from habits formed by conditioning and repetition. In its most extreme form, language learning is seen as like learning in other species, with human language essentially the same as the communication behaviors seen in other species. Examples of scholars on the theoretical side include Francois Gouin, M.D. Berlitz, and Emile B. De Sauzé, whose rationalist theories of language acquisition dovetail with linguistic work done by Noam Chomsky and others. These theories led to a wider variety of teaching methods, ranging from the grammar-translation method and Gouin's "series method" to the direct methods of Berlitz and De Sauzé. Using these methods, students generate original and meaningful sentences to gain a functional understanding of grammar rules. These methods follow from the rationalist position that man is born to think, that language use is a uniquely human characteristic, and that it reflects an innately specified universal grammar. An associated idea in language education is that human languages share many traits. Another is that language learners can create sentences they have not heard before, and these 'new' sentences can still be immediately understood by anyone who understands the specific language being produced.

=== 21st century ===
Over time, language education has developed in schools and become part of the curriculum around the world. In some countries, such as the United States, language education (also referred to as World Languages) has become a core subject along with main subjects such as English, Maths and Science.

In some countries, such as Australia, it is now so common for a foreign language to be taught in schools that the subject of language education is referred to as LOTE (Language Other Than English). In most English-speaking education centers, French, Spanish, and German are the most popular languages to study. English as a Second Language (ESL) is also available for students whose first language is not English and who are unable to speak it to the required standard.

== Teaching foreign language in classrooms ==
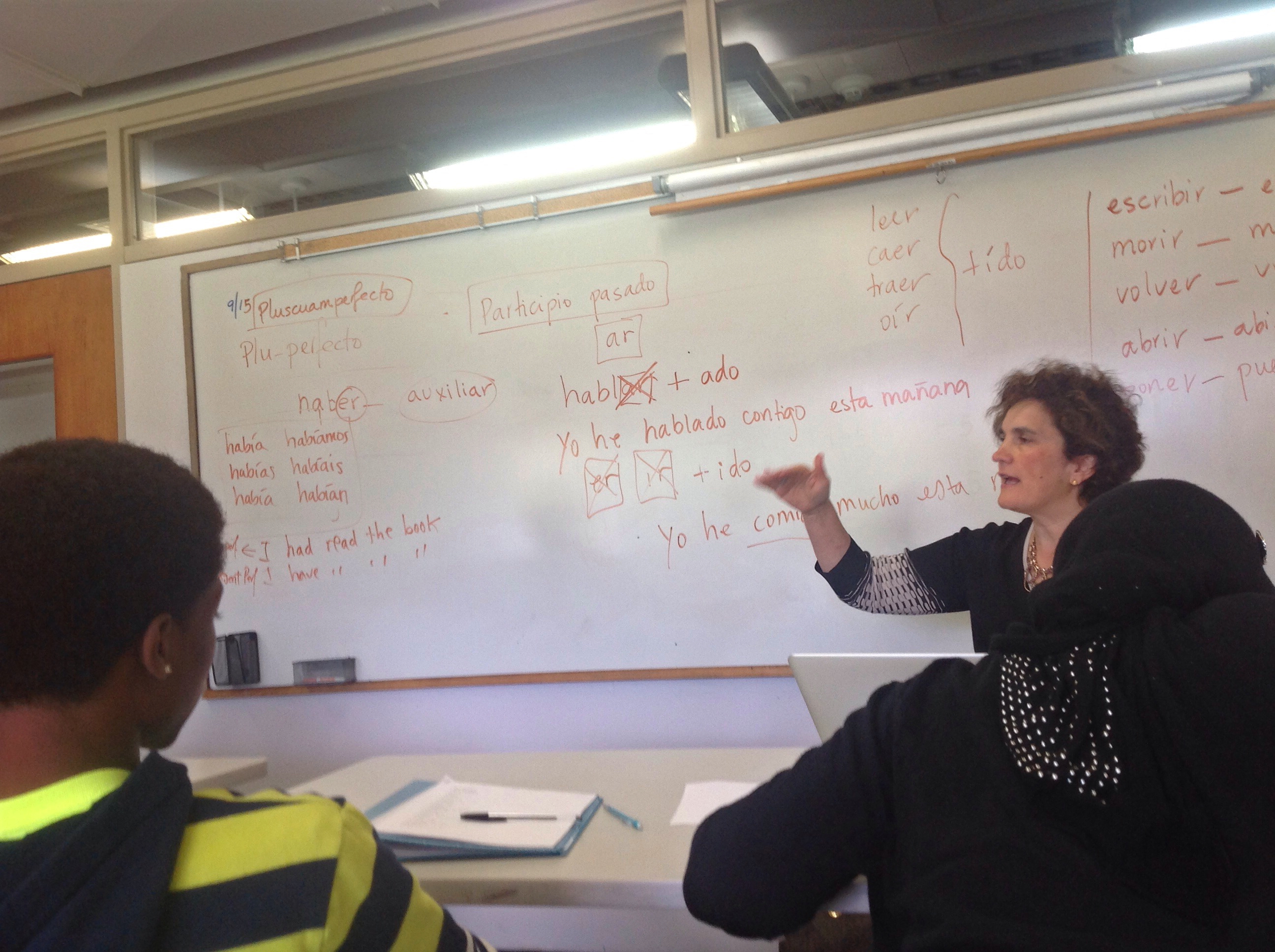
High school Spanish taught as a second language to a class of native English speakers at an American private school in Massachusetts.

Language education may take place as a general school subject or in a specialized language school. There are many methods of teaching languages. Some have fallen into relative obscurity, and others are widely used. Still, others have a small following, but offer useful insights. While sometimes used interchangeably, the terms "approach", "method", and "technique" are hierarchical concepts.

An approach is a set of assumptions about the nature of language and language learning. It does not involve a procedure or provide details on how such assumptions should be implemented in the classroom. Such can be related to second-language acquisition theory.

There are three principal approaches:

1. The structural view emphasizes language as a system of configurationally related elements to code meaning (e.g., grammar).
2. The functional view emphasizes language as a way to express or accomplish a certain goal, such as requesting something.
3. The interactive view emphasizes language as a way of creating and maintaining social relations, focusing on patterns of moves, acts, negotiation, and interaction found in conversational exchanges. This approach has been fairly dominant since the 1980s.

A method is a plan for presenting the language material to be learned. It should be based on a selected approach. For an approach to be translated into a method, an instructional system must be designed with consideration of the objectives of the teaching/learning situation, how the content is to be selected and organized, the types of tasks to be performed, the roles of students, and the roles of teachers.

1. Examples of structural methods are grammar translation and the audio-lingual method.
2. Examples of functional methods include the oral approach / situational language teaching.
3. Examples of interactive methods include the direct method, the series method, communicative language teaching, language immersion, the Silent Way, suggestopedia, the natural approach, tandem language learning, total physical response, Teaching Proficiency through Reading and Storytelling and Dogme language teaching.

A technique (or strategy) is a very specific, concrete stratagem or mechanism designed to accomplish an immediate objective. Such are derived from the controlling method, and less directly, from the approach.

In addition to the three-tiered view above, another lens is humanistic language teaching, in which a cluster of beliefs, attitudes, and core concepts from humanistic psychology informs the approach, methods, and techniques employed. Earl Stevick and Gertrude Moskowitz, often regarded as humanistic language teacher educators, considered participation and student-centeredness central to language teaching and to being a language teacher. Humanistic language teaching has been strongly associated with many of the interactive methods listed above.

== Online and self-study courses ==
Hundreds of languages are available for self-study, from scores of publishers, for a range of costs, using a variety of methods. The course itself acts as a teacher and has to choose a methodology, just as classroom teachers do.

=== Audio recordings and books ===
Audio recordings feature native speakers, and one strength is that they help learners improve their accent. Some recordings have pauses for the learner to speak. Others are continuous, so the learner speaks along with the recorded voice, similar to learning a song. Audio recordings for self-study use many of the methods used in classroom teaching, and have been produced on records, tapes, CDs, DVDs, and websites. Most audio recordings teach content words in the target language by using explanations in the learner's own language. An alternative is to use sound effects to show the meaning of words in the target language. The only language in such recordings is the target language, and they are comprehensible regardless of the learner's native language. Language books have been published for centuries, teaching vocabulary, grammar, and relevant cultural information. The simplest books are phrasebooks to give useful short phrases for travelers, cooks, receptionists, or others who need specific vocabulary. More complete books include more vocabulary, grammar, exercises, translation, and writing practice. Also, various other "language learning tools" have entered the market in recent years.

=== Internet and software ===
Software can interact with learners in ways that books and audio cannot:

1. Some software records the learner, analyzes the pronunciation, and gives feedback.
2. Software can present additional exercises in areas where a learner has particular difficulty until the concepts are mastered.
3. Software can pronounce content words in the target language and show their meaning by using pictures instead of oral explanations. The only language in such software is the target language. It is comprehensible regardless of the learner's native language.

Websites provide various services geared toward language education. Some sites are designed specifically for learning languages:

1. Some software runs on the web itself, with the advantage of avoiding downloads, and the disadvantage of requiring an internet connection.
2. Some publishers use the web to distribute audio, texts, and software for use offline. For example, various travel guides, such as Lonely Planet, offer software supporting language education.
3. Some websites offer learning activities such as quizzes or puzzles to practice language concepts.
4. Language exchange sites connect users with complementary language skills, such as a native Spanish speaker who wants to learn English with a native English speaker who wants to learn Spanish. Language exchange websites essentially treat knowledge of a language as a commodity and provide a marketlike environment for its exchange. Users typically contact each other via chat, VoIP, or email. Language exchanges have also been viewed as a helpful tool to aid language learning at language schools. Language exchanges tend to benefit oral proficiency, fluency, colloquial vocabulary acquisition, and vernacular usage, rather than formal grammar or writing skills. Across Australasia, 'Education Perfect' – an online learning site - is frequently used because it enables teachers to monitor students' progress, with students earning a "point" for every new word remembered. There is an annual international Education Perfect languages contest held in May.

Many other websites help learn languages, even though they are designed, maintained, and marketed for other purposes:

1. All countries have websites in their own languages, which learners elsewhere can use as primary material for study: news, fiction, videos, songs, etc. In a study done by the Center for Applied Linguistics, it was noted that the use of technology and media has begun to play a heavy role in facilitating language learning in the classroom. With the help of the internet, students are readily exposed to foreign media (music videos, television shows, films); as a result, teachers are taking heed of its influence and are seeking ways to incorporate this exposure into their classroom teaching.
2. Translation sites let learners find the meaning of foreign text or create translations of text from their native language into a foreign language.
3. Speech synthesis or text-to-speech (TTS) sites and software let learners hear the pronunciation of arbitrary written text, with pronunciation similar to a native speaker.
4. Course development and learning management systems such as Moodle are used by teachers, including language teachers.
5. Web conferencing tools can bring remote learners together.
6. Players of computer games can practice a target language when interacting in massively multiplayer online games and virtual worlds, commonly English. In 2005, the virtual world Second Life began to be used for foreign-language tuition, sometimes with entire businesses developed. In addition, Spain's language and cultural institute Instituto Cervantes has an "island" on Second Life.

Some Internet content is free, often from government and nonprofit sites such as BBC Online, Book2, Foreign Service Institute, with no or minimal ads. Some are ad-supported, such as newspapers and YouTube. Some require a payment.

== Learning strategies for spoken languages ==
Language learning strategies have attracted increasing attention as a way to understand the process of language acquisition.

=== Listening as a way to learn ===
Clearly, listening is used to learn, but not all language learners use it consciously. Listening to understand is one level of listening, but focused listening is not something that most learners use as a strategy. Focused listening is a listening strategy that helps students listen attentively without distractions. Focused listening is very important when learning a foreign language, as the slightest accent on a word can completely change its meaning.

=== Reading as a way to learn ===
Many people read to understand, but the strategy of reading text to learn grammar and discourse styles can also be used. Parallel texts may be used to improve comprehension.

=== Speaking as a way to learn ===
Alongside listening and reading exercises, practicing conversation skills can also improve language acquisition. Learners can gain experience speaking foreign languages through in-person language classes, language meet-ups, university language exchange programs, online language-learning communities, and traveling to a country where the language is spoken.

=== Learning vocabulary ===
Translation and rote memorization have been the two strategies traditionally used. Other strategies can also be used, such as guessing based on contextual clues, and spaced repetition using various apps, games, and tools (e.g., Duolingo and Anki). Knowledge about how the brain works can be utilized in creating strategies for how to remember words.

=== Esperanto as a propaedeutic language ===
Esperanto is a constructed language created in 1887 by L. L. Zamenhof, a Polish-Jewish ophthalmologist who wanted to eliminate language barriers in international communication. Esperanto is based on Indo-European languages and has a highly regular grammar and writing system. It has been proposed that learning Esperanto can provide a propaedeutic effect for foreign language study. That is, studying Esperanto for one year and then studying another language afterward may result in greater proficiency in the long run than studying the target language only. However, some of the findings from these studies are compromised by unclear objectives, brief or anecdotal reporting, and a lack of methodological rigor.

== Teaching strategies for spoken languages ==
=== Blended learning ===
Blended learning combines face-to-face teaching with distance education, frequently electronic, either computer-based or web-based.

=== Skill teaching ===
The four basic language skills are listening, speaking, reading, and writing. However, other, more socially-based skills have been identified more recently. Examples include summarizing, describing, and narrating. In addition, more general learning skills, such as study skills and recognizing one's own best learning style, have been applied in language classrooms.

In the 1970s and 1980s, these four basic skills were generally taught in isolation in a very rigid order, such as listening before speaking. But since then, it has been recognized that people generally use more than one language skill at a time, leading to more integrated exercises. Speaking is a skill that often is underrepresented in the traditional classroom. This is because it is considered harder to teach and test. There are numerous texts on teaching and testing writing, but relatively few on teaching and testing speaking.

More recent textbooks stress the importance of students working with other students in pairs and groups, sometimes the entire class. Pair and group work give opportunities for more students to participate more actively. However, supervision of pairs and groups is important to make sure everyone participates as equally as possible. Such activities also provide opportunities for peer teaching, where weaker learners can find support from stronger classmates.

=== Sandwich technique ===
In foreign language teaching, the sandwich technique is the oral insertion of an idiomatic translation in the mother tongue between an unknown phrase in the learned language and its repetition, to convey meaning as rapidly and completely as possible. The mother tongue equivalent can be given almost as an aside, with a slight break in the flow of speech to mark it as an intruder.

When modeling a dialogue sentence for students to repeat, the teacher not only provides an oral mother-tongue equivalent for unknown words or phrases but also repeats the foreign-language phrase before students imitate it: L2 $\rightarrow$ L1 $\rightarrow$ L2. For example, a German teacher of English might engage in the following exchange with the students:

Teacher: "Let me try – lass mich versuchen – let me try."
Students: "Let me try."

=== Mother tongue mirroring ===
Mother tongue mirroring is the adaptation of the time-honored technique of literal translation or word-for-word translation for pedagogical purposes. The aim is to make foreign constructions salient and transparent to learners while avoiding the technical jargon of grammatical analysis. It differs from literal translation and interlinear text in that it takes learners' progress into account and focuses on a specific structure at a time. As a didactic device, it can only be used to the extent that it remains intelligible to the learner, unless it is combined with a normal idiomatic translation.

=== Back-chaining ===
Back-chaining is a technique used in teaching oral language skills, especially with polysyllabic or difficult words. The teacher pronounces the last syllable, the student repeats, and then the teacher continues, working backwards from the end of the word to the beginning.

For example, to teach the name Mussorgsky, a teacher will pronounce the last syllable: -sky, and have the student repeat it. Then the teacher will repeat it with -sorg- attached before: -sorg-sky, and all that remains is the first syllable: Mus-sorg-sky.

=== Code switching ===
Code-switching occurs when a language user alternates between two or more languages at different times, in different places, for different content, objects, and other factors. For example, code-switching may occur in a multilingual family or an immigrant family. That is to say, the capability of using code switching, relating to the transformation of phonetics, words, language structure, expression mode, thinking mode, cultural differences and so on, is needed to be guided and developed in the daily communication environment. Most people learn foreign languages in circumstances where they use their native language, so that their ability to code-switch cannot be stimulated. Thus, the efficiency of foreign language acquisition would decrease. Therefore, as a teaching strategy, code switching is used to help students better gain conceptual competences and to provide rich semantic context for them to understand some specific vocabularies.

== By region ==
Practices in language education may vary by region; however, the underlying understandings that drive it are fundamentally similar. Rote repetition, drilling, memorization, and grammar conjugating are used the world over. Sometimes there are different preferences teaching methods by region. Language immersion is popular in some European countries but is not widely used in the United States, Asia, or Australia.

== By different life stage ==
=== Early childhood education ===
Early childhood is a critical time for language mastery. Hearing infants know some phonological elements of the languages around them at birth. By six months, infants recognize concrete words for things like food and body parts. By two years, children produce sentences that are grammatically similar to those of adults, including in the types of errors that they make. While young children's language is largely acquired naturally by living in a verbal communication environment, they can also benefit from more formal language education.

=== Compulsory education ===
For many people, compulsory education is when they first have access to a second or foreign language. During this period, professional foreign-language education and an academic atmosphere are provided to students. They can get help and motivation from teachers and be activated by their peers. One would be able to undergo specialized study to learn a great number of rules governing vocabulary, grammar, and verbal communication.

=== Adult education ===
Learning a foreign language in adulthood means one is pursuing a higher value for oneself by acquiring a new skill. At this stage, individuals have developed the ability to self-supervise while learning a language. However, the pressure is also an obstacle for adults.

=== Elderly education ===
Compared to other life stages, this period is the hardest to learn a new language due to gradual brain deterioration and memory loss. Despite its challenges, language education for seniors can slow brain degeneration and promote active aging.

== Language study holidays ==
An increasing number of people are now combining holidays with language study in the native country. This enables the student to experience the target culture by meeting local people. Such a holiday often combines formal lessons, cultural excursions, leisure activities, and a homestay, perhaps with time to travel in the country afterward. Language study holidays are popular across Europe (Malta & UK being the most popular) and Asia, due to the ease of travel and the variety of nearby countries. These holidays have become increasingly popular in Central and South America, in countries such as Guatemala, Ecuador, and Peru. As a consequence of this increasing popularity, several international language education agencies have flourished in recent years. Though education systems around the world invest enormous sums of money into language teaching, the outcomes in terms of getting students actually to speak the language(s) they are learning outside the classroom are often unclear.

With the increasing prevalence of international business transactions, it is now important to have multiple languages at one's disposal. Nine out of ten U.S. employers report relying on U.S.-based employees with language skills other than English, with one-third (32%) reporting a high level of dependence.

== Minority language education ==
=== Minority language education policy ===
The principal policy arguments in favor of promoting minority language education are the need for multilingual workforces, intellectual and cultural benefits, and greater inclusion in the global information society. Access to education in a minority language is also seen as a human right as granted by the European Convention on Human Rights and Fundamental Freedoms, the European Charter for Regional or Minority Languages and the UN Human Rights Committee. Bilingual Education has been implemented in many countries, including the United States, to promote both the use and appreciation of the minority language, as well as the majority language concerned.

=== Materials and e-learning for minority language education ===
Suitable resources for teaching and learning minority languages are often difficult to find and access, which has led to calls for greater development of materials for minority language teaching. The internet offers opportunities to access a wider range of texts, audio, and video. Language learning 2.0 (the use of web 2.0 tools for language education) offers opportunities for material development for lesser-taught languages and to bring together geographically dispersed teachers and learners.

== Acronyms and abbreviations ==
- ALL: Apprenticeship Language Learning
- CALL: computer-assisted language learning
- CLIL: content and language integrated learning
- CELI: Certificato di Conoscenza della Lingua Italiana
- CLL: community language learning
- DELE: Diploma de Español como Lengua Extranjera
- DELF: diplôme d'études en langue française
- EFL: English as a foreign language
- EAL/D: English as an additional language or dialect
- EAP: English for academic purposes
- ELL: English language learning
- ELT: English language teaching
- ESL: English as a second language
- ESP: English for specific purposes English for specific purposes
- FLL: foreign language learning
- FLT: foreign language teaching
- HLL: heritage language learning
- IATEFL: International Association of Teachers of English as a Foreign Language International Association of Teachers of English as a Foreign Language
- L1: first language, native language, mother tongue
- L2: second language (or any additional language)
- LDL: Lernen durch Lehren (German for learning by teaching)
- LOTE: Languages Other Than English
- MFL: modern foreign languages
- SLA: second-language acquisition
- TELL: technology-enhanced language learning
- TEFL: teaching English as a foreign language
- TEFLA: teaching English as a foreign language to adults
- TESOL: teaching English to speakers of other languages
- TEYL: teaching English to young learners
- TPR: Total Physical Response
- TPRS: Teaching Proficiency through Reading and Storytelling
- UNIcert is a European language education system of many universities based on the Common European Framework of Reference for Languages.

== See also ==
- American Council on the Teaching of Foreign Languages
- Directorate of Language Planning and Implementation
- Eikaiwa school
- Error analysis (linguistics)
- Foreign language anxiety
- Foreign language writing aid
- Foreign language reading aid
- Glossary of language teaching terms and ideas
- Language education by region
- Language MOOC
- Language policy
- Lexicography
- Linguistic rights
- List of language acquisition researchers
- Monolingual learner's dictionary
- Self access language learning centers
- Tandem language learning
- Computer-assisted language learning

== Sources ==
- Australian-Japanese relations today. (2016). Skwirk. Retrieved 16 May 2016, from http://www.skwirk.com/p-c_s-16_u-430_t-1103_c-4268/australian-japanese-relations-today/nsw/australian-japanese-relations-today/conflict-consensus-and-care/changing-attitudes
- Parry, M. (2016). Australian university students and their Japanese host families in short-term stays. The University of Queensland. Retrieved 16 May 2016, from https://espace.library.uq.edu.au/view/UQ:349330/s3213739_phd_submission.pdf
- Pérez-Milans, M (2013). Urban schools and English language education in late modern China: A Critical sociolinguistic ethnography. New York & London: Routledge.
- Gao, Xuesong (Andy). (2010). Strategic Language Learning. Multilingual Matters: Canada, 2010
- Kim Yeong-seo (2009) "History of English education in Korea."
- Kirkpatrick, A., & Zhichang, X (2002). "Chinese pragmatic norms and "China English". World Englishes. Vol. 21, pp. 269–279.
- Kubota, K (1998) "Ideologies of English in Japan" World Englishes Vol. 17, No.3, pp. 295–306.
- Phillips, J. K. (2007). Foreign Language Education: Whose Definition?. The Modern Language Journal, 91(2), 266–268.
- American Council on the Teaching of Foreign Languages (2011). Language Learning in the 21st Century: 21st Century Skills Map.
