= Fortress Japan =

Japanese company

Fortress Japan (Katakana: フォートレスジャパン) is a Japanese company that operates eikaiwa English conversation schools under brands including Global Trinity （Katakana: グローバルトリニティー）. The Consumer Affairs Agency and the Tokyo metropolitan government shut down the company for six months in February 2010 due to its coercive marketing practices, which included false explanations and harassment—both illegal under Japanese law.

== Branch history ==
The first school was opened in Osaka in 1986. The next year, Tokyo and Nagoya schools were opened. The Fukuoka-shi branch that opened in 2005 was its first in Southern Japan, and in the next year the Sendai branch began operations in Northern Japan. In July 2009 the Tokyo, Nagoya, and Osaka branches changed their branding to HER-S (ハーツ).

== Sites offline ==
Both the global-trinity.com and her-s.net websites have been taken down pursuant to the governmental suspension of operations order.

== See also ==
- Consumer protection
- 特定商取引に関する法律
