= Language education by region =

Lingual teaching

Practices in language education vary significantly by region. Firstly, the languages being learned differ; in the United States, Spanish is the most popular language to be learned, whereas the most popular languages to be learned in Australia are German, French, Italian and Mandarin Chinese. Also, teaching methods tend to differ by region. Language immersion is popular in some European countries, and not used very much in the United States.

== Asia ==
In Asia, most children learn an official version of their native language or learn a local major lingua franca (for example Mandarin, Hindustani) in Asia-Pacific countries, and all subjects are taught in that lingua franca language except for foreign language lessons. Singapore, in which English is taught as a first language, is an exception. In India, Hindi and English are both official languages of the Government of India and are both compulsory languages to learn in a number of schools. Some students also study official regional Indian languages along with English. English is the most-studied foreign language in the People's Republic of China, India, Pakistan, Japan, South Korea, Republic of China (Taiwan), Singapore and Hong Kong. In China, English is a required language starting in third grade, although the quality of instruction varies greatly. In Nepal, all subjects can be taken in a choice of Nepali or English, except the respected language subjects.

=== Hong Kong ===
Native Cantonese-speaking Hong Kong children commence learning English and maybe also Mandarin from age 3 when they go to kindergarten and continue until they finish their secondary education. The Hong Kong government's language policy is to produce people who are biliterate in English and Written Chinese and trilingual in Cantonese, Mandarin and English. In order to enter university in Hong Kong, students must pass both English and Chinese exams, or in the case of those who did not learn Chinese at school, due to having studied at an international school, another foreign language.

=== Pakistan ===
In Pakistan, English has the status of an official language and is widely used within the government, by the civil service and the officer ranks of the military. Pakistan's Constitution and laws are written in English. It is also taught extensively in both public and private schools. Studying of English is compulsory in Pakistan along with Urdu (the national language and lingua franca of Pakistan). Regional languages of Pakistan are open to choice and a student is free to either pursue them or not. Nearly all schools, colleges and universities use English as the medium of instruction.

=== Malaysia ===
In Malaysia, Malay and English are taught as compulsory languages from the first year of primary school with the exception of publicly funded vernacular schools (known as national type schools). In the latter, either Mandarin or Tamil are taught as additional compulsory languages. In non-vernacular schools, all subjects with the exception of the sciences and mathematics are taught in Malay. In vernacular schools, all subjects with the exception of the sciences and mathematics are taught in the primary language that is used in the respective schools. The sciences and mathematics are taught in English, although some Mandarin vernacular schools have dispensation to teach those subjects concurrently in Mandarin.

=== Sri Lanka ===
In Sri Lanka, where the official state languages are Sinhalese, Tamil, and English, all government schools instruct either in Sinhala or Tamil. A few higher-level government schools (national-level schools) also offer instruction in English. All students studying in Sinhalese or Tamil are also taught English as a second language. All students studying in Sinhalese are also taught Tamil as a second language, and vice versa.

== Europe ==
In all European Union school systems, it is mandatory to study at least one foreign language at some stage during the school career; there is a tendency for this to start earlier, even in the first year of primary school. Additional languages can be chosen as an optional subject. The most common foreign language chosen is increasingly English (the most popular first foreign language in 23 of the 25 member states of the European Union which do not have English as the language of instruction), followed by French and German. Some 90% of pupils learn English as a foreign language, whether the choice of language is obligatory or parental. Teaching is largely provided by generalist teachers in primary school and by specialists in middle and secondary schools. An exception to this is Ireland, where Irish Gaelic and English are the only mandatory languages, although the majority of students also study a modern language as it may be compulsory to do so at second level.

=== Foreign language education ===
1995 European Commission’s White Paper "Teaching and learning – Towards the learning society", stated that "upon completing initial training, everyone should be proficient in two Community foreign languages". The Lisbon Summit of 2000 defined languages as one of the five key skills.

In fact, even in 1974, at least one foreign language was compulsory in all but two European member states: Ireland and the United Kingdom (apart from Scotland). By 1998 nearly all pupils in Europe studied at least one foreign language as part of their compulsory education, the only exception being the Republic of Ireland, where primary and secondary schoolchildren learn both Irish and English, but neither is considered a foreign language although a third European language is also taught. Pupils in upper secondary education learn at least two foreign languages in Belgium, France, Denmark, Netherlands, Luxembourg, Finland, Sweden, Iceland, Switzerland, Greece, Croatia, Cyprus, Estonia, Latvia, Lithuania, Poland, Romania, Serbia, Slovenia and Slovakia.

On average in Europe, at the start of foreign language teaching, pupils have lessons for three to four hours a week. Compulsory lessons in a foreign language normally start at the end of primary school or the start of secondary school. In Luxembourg, Norway, Italy, Malta and Spain, however, the first foreign language starts at age six, in Denmark at age seven and in Belgium at age 10. About half of the EU's primary school pupils learn a foreign language.

English is the language taught most often at the lower secondary level in the EU. There, 93% of children learn English. At upper secondary level, English is even more widely taught. French is taught at lower secondary level in all EU countries except Slovenia. A total of 33% of European Union pupils learn French at this level. At upper secondary level the figure drops slightly to 28%. German is taught in nearly all EU countries. A total of 13% of pupils in the European Union learn German in lower secondary education, and 20% learn it at an upper secondary level.

Despite the high rate of foreign language teaching in schools, the number of adults claiming to speak a foreign language is generally lower than might be expected. This is particularly true of native English speakers: in 2004 a British survey showed that only one in 10 UK workers could speak a foreign language. Less than 5% could count to 20 in a second language, for example. 80% said they could work abroad anyway, because "everyone speaks English." In 2001, a European Commission survey found that 65.9% of people in the UK spoke only their native tongue.

Since the 1990s, the Common European Framework of Reference for Languages has tried to standardize the learning of languages across Europe (one of the first results being UNIcert).

=== Bilingual education ===
In some countries, learners have lessons taken entirely in a foreign language: for example, more than half of European countries with a minority or regional language community use partial immersion to teach both the minority and the state language.

In the 1960s and 1970s, some central and eastern European countries created a system of bilingual schools for well-performing pupils. Subjects other than languages were taught in a foreign language. In the 1990s this system was opened to all pupils in general education, although some countries still make candidates sit an entrance exam. At the same time, Belgium, France, the Netherlands, Austria and Finland also started bilingual schooling schemes. Germany meanwhile had established some bilingual schools in the late 1960s.

=== United Kingdom ===
French, German, and Spanish are taught in most schools, but the UK Government does not mandate the teaching of particular languages.

In England, all local authority-run schools must teach at least one foreign language to pupils between the ages of 7 and 14. At Key Stage 2 (ages 7 to 11), such schools must teach a modern or ancient language, while at Key Stage 3 (ages 11 to 14) they must teach a modern language. However, academies and free schools are exempt from this requirement. Furthermore, languages have not been compulsory beyond the age of 14 since 2004.

In Scotland, the Scottish Government is implementing a "1+2" policy, giving pupils an "entitlement to learn a language" from the age of 4 or 5 until the age of 14 or 15. As of 2021, the policy intends for all schools to offer one additional language from Primary 1 (ages 4–6) and a second additional language from Primary 5 (ages 8–10). Both are expected to be taught until the end of Secondary 3 (ages 13–15). The government will not mandate specific languages, but rather these will be decided by schools and local authorities.

In Wales, all children at English language medium state schools learn Welsh as a second language until the age of 16, which is mainly taught through the medium of English. Welsh language schools teach mainly through the medium of Welsh.

Language-learning uptake has been declining among UK students for decades, with French and German falling the most since 2004. In 2020 it was reported that 30% of secondary schools in Scotland were failing to offer even one additional language, even though they are required by government to offer two.

Modern languages are studied in universities and colleges and various degrees are awarded in modern languages. The Modern Humanities Research Association was founded at Cambridge in 1918: after an early change of name to MHRA in 1918, the unincorporated charity became an incorporated company with the same name on 2 October 1997. Its declared aim is to encourage and promote advanced study and research in the field of the modern humanities, which include the modern and medieval European languages, literatures and cultures.

== United States ==
Although there is no official language of the United States, children learn American English as part of their institutional education. As the responsibility of K-12 education sits not with the U.S. Department of Education but with each individual state's State Education Agency (State Department of Education), some public school districts containing large numbers of English language learners (ELLs, notably students who speak Spanish, Chinese, and Navajo) offer bilingual education. This two-way setting uses the student's native language as well as English to impart curriculum, but the National Association for Bilingual Education notes it has been a controversial—and sometimes political—topic for a portion of citizens who advocate for English-only education. The U.S. also hosts multiple English as a Second Language (ESL) programs for people who have not learned English in school (most frequently immigrants to the U.S.).

As the global world economy makes knowledge of a world language a valuable work skill, a growing number of elementary and middle school school districts now offer modern language courses, usually on an optional basis. Students are increasingly advised (and at times required) to study a foreign language in high school, and more frequently at the college or university level. In 2006, "the most commonly studied foreign language[s] in the U.S., determined by the number of students enrolled in foreign language classes in colleges and universities" were, in order of popularity: Spanish, French, German, American Sign Language, Italian, Japanese, Chinese, Latin, Russian, and Arabic.

In most school systems, foreign language is taken in high school, with multiple schools requiring one to three years of foreign language in order to graduate. In some school systems, foreign language is also taught during middle school, and more recently, multiple elementary schools have been teaching foreign languages as well. However, foreign language immersion programs are growing in popularity, making it possible for elementary school children to begin serious development of a second language.

In 2008 the Center for Applied Linguistics conducted an extensive survey documenting foreign language study in the United States. The most popular language is Spanish, due to the large number of recent Spanish-speaking immigrants to the United States (see Spanish in the United States). According to this survey, in 2008 88% of language programs in elementary schools taught Spanish, compared to 93% in secondary schools. Other languages taught in U.S. high schools in 2008, in descending order of frequency, were French, German, Latin, Mandarin Chinese, American Sign Language, Italian, and Japanese. During the Cold War, the United States government pushed for Russian education, and some schools still maintain their Russian programs. Other languages recently gaining popularity include Arabic. The Center for Applied Linguistics also conducted a study that concluded that while the number of schools from the elementary to secondary level offering foreign language instruction are on the rise, a pitfall of the curriculum is that students are not becoming proficient in the target languages. Researchers also note that American students of foreign languages significantly underperform in comparison to their European and Asian counterparts. It has been suggested that a system where foreign language instruction is required from PK-12 should be implemented in order to fix this problem.

== Canada ==
Language education in Canada is deeply rooted in the country’s history of bilingualism, with both English and French recognized as official languages. According to Section 23(1)(b) of the Constitution Act, 1982 of the Canadian Charter of Rights and Freedoms, citizens have the right to receive minority language education, even if the language differs from that of their parents, regardless of the province they reside in. This constitutional protection specifically applies to the two official languages of Canada: English and French.

As of recent statistics, 22.0% of the Canadian population identifies French as their first language, with Quebec being home to well around 84% of those French speakers. However, recently there has been a growing push for the Canadian government to add protection and recognition to Indigenous languages, such as Cree and Inuktitu, in hopes to preserve and revitalize these languages.

== Australia ==
Prior to the British colonisation, there were hundreds of Aboriginal languages, taught in a traditional way. The arrival of a substantial number of Irish in the first English convict ships meant that European Australia was not ever truly monolingual. When the gold rushes of the 1850s trebled the white population, it brought more Welsh speakers, who had their own language newspapers through to the 1870s, but the absence of language education meant that these Celtic languages never flourished.

Waves of European migration after World War II brought "community languages," sometimes with schools. However, from 1788 until modern times it was generally expected that immigrants would learn English and abandon their first language. The wave of multicultural policies since the 1970s has softened aspects of these attitudes.

In 1982 a bipartisan committee of Australian parliamentarians was appointed and identified a number of guiding principles that would support a National Policy on Languages (NPL). Its trend was towards bilingualism in all Australians, for reasons of fairness, diversity and economics.

In the 1990s the Australian Languages and Literacy Policy (ALLP) was introduced, building on the NPL, with extra attention being given to the economic motivations of second language learning. A distinction became drawn between priority languages and community languages. The ten priority languages identified were Mandarin, French, German, Modern Greek, Indonesian, Japanese, Italian, Korean, Spanish and Aboriginal languages.

However, Australia's federal system meant that the NPL and ALLP direction was really an overall policy from above without much engagement from the states and territories. The NALSAS strategy united Australian Government policy with that of the states and territories. It focused on four targeted languages: Mandarin, Indonesian, Japanese and Korean. This would be integrated into studies of Society and Environment, English and Arts.

By 2000, the top ten languages enrolled in the final high school year were, in descending order: Japanese, French, German, Chinese, Indonesian, Italian, Greek, Vietnamese, Spanish and Arabic. In 2002, only about 10% of Year 12 included at least one language other than English (LOTE) among their course choices. In 2009, Lo Bianco and Slaughter, recommended a new approach, stating that “What is needed is a universal apprenticeship in learning how to learn languages”. An apprenticeship language is a relatively easy language which is taught to overcome the limitations of monolingualism, in preparation for later mastery of a different language or languages.

Reasons to use an apprenticeship language are:

- To make a start when target language teachers are unavailable.
- To master a whole foreign language, for motivation and effective subsequent learning.
- To combat procrastination in the face of diverse priorities in Language education.
- To normalize bilingualism and promote flexibility.
- To model creative problem solving, ethical behaviour and global citizenship.

A resource and method has been devised to implement the ALL approach by equipping generalist primary (elementary) teachers to teach the simple designed language Esperanto as a first, fluent, intercultural, foreign language.

The professional body for teachers of foreign languages in Australia is the Australian Federation of Modern Language Teachers Associations.

== India ==
The syllabus taught in schools highly depends on the state. Most of the states follow a 3 language policy in high schools. Three languages usually include the local language of the state and English as a first and third language and Hindi, Urdu and Sanskrit as a second language (or recently some other foreign languages like French, German, Italian and in some schools, Arabic). Hindi-speaking states have recently started offering other regional languages in India as a second language. Primary and middle schools mostly only teach two languages, the local language of state and English. In medium and large cities, most private schools use English as the medium of instruction. Currently India has launched NEP. With NEP Indian Education System is targeting students to learn technology knowledge. They have included multiple computer related languages and points from lower classes.

== Middle East and North Africa ==
Language study in the Middle East and North Africa varies from one country to another, usually depending on the foreign nation that colonized or occupied the country. For instance, in Algeria, Morocco, and Tunisia, French is the most widely studied language besides the native Arabic, while in Egypt and the Persian Gulf countries (such as the United Arab Emirates, Kuwait, and Oman), English is the main supplementary language. The teaching of languages other than Arabic, mainly English, is compulsory in all schools in southern and central Iraq and at all levels, being a requirement for graduation from school. In the Kurdistan Region (northern Iraq), the Palestinian Authority, Saudi Arabia, Syria, and Yemen, English is compulsory at all schools and all levels. In these countries, English and other foreign languages tend to be offered as subjects only in certain, wealthier schools. While Hebrew is the national language of Israel, English or Arabic are compulsory in elementary schools.

=== Egypt ===
As Egypt's economy depends mainly on tourism, multiple modern languages are taught and spoken there. All children learn Arabic in school, but English is also mandatory beginning with the first grade (6 years of age). Another language is mandatory for the last two years of high school (17–18 years); French and German are the most commonly learned. There are also schools that specialize in particular languages. For instance, in French schools in Egypt students learn Arabic, French and then English later on. In German schools in Egypt students learn Arabic, German and then English and probably some basic French as well.

=== Iran ===
Until 2022 Iran had a couple languages, in July 2023 six new languages have been added Chinese, Russian, French, Arabic, Spanish, German, Italian included.

== Venezuela ==
All children learn Spanish at school, but begin to learn English at the age of six in pre-school. In some other schools, like San Jose de Tarbes in Caracas, children begin to learn French and English when they are promoted from pre-school to middle school. And because of the growing number of Chinese immigrants, in certain areas of the country, there are also small schools for learning Chinese starting at the age of eight.
