= Glossary of language education terms =

Language teaching, like other educational activities, may employ specialized vocabulary and word use. This list is a glossary for English language learning and teaching using the communicative approach.

== Glossary ==
=== A ===
Accuracy
Producing language with few errors.
Achievement test
A test to measure what students have learned or achieved from a program of study. These tests must be flexible to respond to the particular goals and needs of the students in a language program.
Activate
The phase in a lesson where students have the opportunity to practice language forms. See “controlled practice”, “guided practice”, and “free practice”.
Active listening
A technique whereby the listener repeats (often in other words) what the speaker has said to demonstrate his or her understanding. Active listening is an especially useful alternative to directly correcting a student error. Compare active listening.
Active vocabulary (also called productive vocabulary)
Vocabulary that students actually use in speaking and writing.
Active
Related to student engagement and participation. For example, listening is perceived to be a passive skill, but is actually active because it involves students in decoding meaning.
Alphabet
A complete standardized set of letters – basic written symbols – each of which roughly represents a phoneme of a spoken language, either as it exists now or as it may have been in the past. English uses the Roman or Latin alphabet, which consists of vowels and consonants.

Vowel
A sound in spoken language characterized by an open configuration of the voice tract so that there is no build-up of air pressure above the vocal cords. The Roman vowels include the letters “a”, “e”, “i”, “o”, “u” and sometimes “y”. In all languages, vowels form the nucleus of a syllable. A vowel also completes a syllable.
Semivowel
A sound that is much like the vowel, but is not the key (nuclear) sound in a syllable. Examples: the opening sounds in the words “yet” and “wet”.
Consonant
An alphabetic character which represents a sound created by a constriction or closure at one or more points along the vocal tract. Consonants form the onset or end of a syllable, or both.

Aptitude
The rate at which a student can learn a language, based on raw talent. Aptitude does not seem to be related to attitude; a gifted student can have a poor attitude.
Attitude
A complex mental state involving beliefs, feelings, values and dispositions to act in certain ways. Attitude affects a student’s ability to learn, but is unrelated to aptitude.
Audiolingualism
A form of language teaching based on behaviourist psychology. It stresses the following: listening and speaking before reading and writing; activities such as dialogues and drills, formation of good habits and automatic language use through much repetition; use of target language only in the classroom. Popular in the late 1960s in the US.
Audio-visual aids
Teaching aids such as audio, video, overhead projection, posters, pictures and graphics.
Aural
Related to listening.
Authentic text
Natural or real teaching material; often this material is taken from newspapers, magazines, radio, TV or podcasts. An authentic text is written by native speakers for native speakers, i.e. it was not written for language learners as part of a language learning program.
Automaticity
A learner’s ability to recover a word automatically, without straining to fetch it from memory.

=== B ===
Behavioural psychology
Also called behaviourism, the belief that learning should be based on psychological study of observable and measurable psychology only; psychological theory based on stimulus-response influenced audiolingualism.
Bottom-up information processing
Students learn partially through bottom-up information processing, or processing based on information present in the language presented. For example, in reading bottom-up processing involves understanding letters, words, and sentence structure rather than making use of the students’ previous knowledge.
Brainstorming
A group activity where students freely contribute their ideas to a topic to generate ideas.
Burn-out
Fatigue usually based on either the stress of overwork or boredom with the same task.

=== C ===
Chomsky, Noam
The ideas of the American linguistic theorist Noam Chomsky can be very abstract, in contrast to the very practical process of communicative language teaching. Chomsky’s theories of knowledge of language and language acquisition relate as much to the study of human nature as to language teaching. As Steven Pinker explains, Chomsky’s claim that…all humans speak a single language is based on the hypothesis that the same symbol-manipulating machinery, without exception, underlies the world’s languages. Linguists have long known that the basic design features of language are found everywhere… A common grammatical code, neutral between production and comprehension, allows speakers to produce any linguistic message they can understand, and vice versa. Words have stable meanings, linked to them by arbitrary convention….Languages can convey meanings that are abstract and remote in time or space from the speaker, (and) linguistic forms are infinite in number.
Chorus
Speaking together as a group; used in choral speaking and jazz chants.
Classroom climate
Environment created in the classroom by factors such as the physical environment and also the interrelationship between the teacher and the students, and among the students.
Classroom management
The management of classroom processes such as how the teacher sets up the classroom and organizes teaching and learning to facilitate instruction. Includes classroom procedures, groupings, how instructions for activities are given, and management of student behaviour.
Cloze
A type of gap fill where the gaps are regular, e.g. every 7th or 9th word. The technique can used to assess students’ reading comprehension or as a practice activity.
Collocation
The way words are often used together. For example, “do the dishes” and “do homework”, but “make the bed” and “make noise”.
Colloquialism
A word or phrase used in conversation – usually in small regions of the English-speaking world – but not in formal speech or writing: “Like, this dude came onto her real bad.”
Communicative Competence
The role of language learning is to achieve communicative competence. Communicative competence has four parts, which we call language competencies.
1. Grammatical competence is how well a person has learned that features and rules of the language. This includes vocabulary, pronunciation, and sentence formation. The main question is: How well does a person understand English grammar?
2. Sociolinguistic competence is how well a person speaks and is understood in various social contexts. This depends on factors such as status of those speaking to each other, the purpose of the interaction, and the expectations of the interaction. The main question is: how socially acceptable is the person’s use of English in different settings?
3. Discourse competence is how well a person can combine grammatical forms and meanings to achieve different types (genres) of speaking or writing. The main question is: How well does one properly combine all the languages elements to speak or write in English?
4. Strategic competence is how well the person uses both verbal forms and non-verbal communication to compensate for lack of knowledge in the other three competencies. The main question is: Can a person find ways to communicate when he or she is lacking some knowledge of English?
Communicative Language Teaching
Communicative language teaching (CLT) is an approach to foreign or second language learning which emphasizes that the goal of language learning is communicative competence. The communicative approach has been developed particularly by British applied linguists as a reaction away from grammar-based approaches such as the aural-oral (audio-lingual) approach. Teaching materials used with a communicative approach teach the language needed to express and understand different kinds of functions, such as requesting, describing, expressing likes and dislikes, etc. Also, they emphasize the processes of communication, such as using language appropriately in different types of situations; using language to perform different kinds of tasks, e.g. to solve puzzles, to get information, etc.; using language for social interaction with other people.
Competence learning model
Especially when we take specialized courses, learning seems to take place in four stages. We begin with unconscious incompetence: we do not know how much we do not know. Once we begin our course of studies, we become consciously incompetent: we know how much we do not know. From there we proceed to conscious competence: we have functional knowledge and can perform competently, but we have to think about what we are doing. Finally, after we have had enough experience, we become unconsciously competent: we know it and we can do it, and we do not much have to think about it. This model applies to a great deal of language learning, to TEFL training and to many other areas of study.
Comprehensible input
Language that is understandable to learners.
Content words
Words that carry meaning; usually nouns, verbs and sometimes adjectives and adverbs.
Context clues
Clues used when guessing word meanings; clues that provide students with meaning or comprehension based on the environment in which a word is found.
Contrastive analysis
Comparing two languages to predict where learning will be facilitated and hindered.
Controlled practice
Language practise where the students are restricted in their choice of language, usually to a single answer, for example a gap fill. (see "Free practise" and "Guided practise")
Creative construction hypothesis
Hypothesis in language acquisition which states that learners gradually develop their own rule systems for language.
Culture
The sum of the beliefs, attitudes, behaviours, habits and customs of a group of people.

=== D ===
Deductive teaching
Also known as deduction, from the verb “to deduce”; a teaching technique in which the teacher presents language rules and the students then practice those rules in activities. Deductive teaching is usually based on grammar-based methodology and proceeds from generalizations about the language to specifics. (See “Inductive teaching and Grammar translation method”.)
Delayed copying
The teacher writes a short familiar sentence on the board, gives students time to look at it, erases it, and then they see if they can write it.
Descriptive grammar
Grammar that is described in terms of what people actually say or write, rather than what grammar books say the grammar of the language should be. See “prescriptive grammar”.
Diagnostic test
A test to diagnose or discover what language students know and what they need to develop to improve their language abilities; may be used before a course of study and combined with placement test.
Dictation
A technique in which the teacher reads a short passage out loud and students write down what the teacher reads; the teacher reads phrases slowly, giving students time to write what they hear; the technique is used for practice as well as testing.
Discourse
See “communicative competence”.

=== F ===
Facilitator
A concept related to a teacher’s approach to interaction with students. Particularly in communicative classrooms, teachers tend to work in partnership with students to develop their language skills. A teacher who is a facilitator tends to be more student-centred and less dominant in the classroom than in other approaches. The facilitator may also take the role of mentor or coach rather than director.
Feedback
Reporting back or giving information back, usually to the teacher; feedback can be verbal, written or nonverbal in the form of facial expressions, gestures, behaviours; teachers can use feedback to discover whether a student understands, is learning, and likes an activity.
Fluency
Natural, normal, native-like speech characterized by appropriate pauses, intonation, stress, register, word choice, interjections and interruptions.
Form-focused instruction
The teaching of specific language content (lexis, structure, phonology). See “language content”.
Free practice
Practice-activities that involve more language choice by the learner. The students focus on the content rather than the language. Used for fluency practice. (see "Controlled practice" and "Guided practice")
Function words
Also known as form words, empty words, structure or structural words and grammar words; these words connect content words grammatically; function words have little or no meaning by themselves. Examples include articles, prepositions and conjunctions.
Functional syllabus
Syllabus based on communicative acts such as making introductions, making requests, expressing opinions, requesting information, refusing, apologising, giving advice, persuading; this type of syllabus is often used in communicative language teaching.

=== G ===
Gesture
A facial or body movement that communicates meaning; examples include a smile, a frown, a shrug, a shake or nod of the head. Gestures often accompany verbal communication.
Grammar
See “descriptive grammar” and “prescriptive grammar”. Also, see “communicative competence”.
Graded reader
Reading material that has been simplified for language students. The readers are usually graded according to difficulty of grammar, vocabulary, or amount of information presented.
Grammar translation method
A method of language teaching characterized by translation and the study of grammar rules. Involves presentation of grammatical rules, vocabulary lists, and translation. Emphasizes knowledge and use of language rules rather than communicative competence. This method of language teaching was popular in the 20th century until the early 1960s.
Grammatical syllabus
A syllabus based on the grammar or structure of a language; often part of the grammar translation method.
Guided practice
An intermediate stage in language practice - between "controlled practice" (q.v.) and "free practice" (q.v.) activities; this stage features allows for some creativity from the students.

=== I ===
Idiom
A group of words whose meaning is different from the meanings of the individual words: “She let the cat out of the bag” or “He was caught red-handed.”
Inductive teaching
Also known as induction, from the verb “to induce”; a facilitative, student-centred teaching technique where the students discover language rules through extensive use of the language and exposure to many examples. This is the preferred technique in communicative language teaching. (See “ Deductive teaching”.)
Input hypothesis
Hypothesis that states that learners learn language through exposure to language that is just beyond their level of comprehension. See “Krashen, Stephen”.
Interference
A phenomenon in language learning where the first language interferes with learning the target or foreign language.
Interlanguage
The language a learner uses before mastering the foreign language; it may contain features of the first language and the target language as well as non-standard features.
Interlocutor
In a conversation, this refers to the person you are speaking to.
Intonation
How we change the pitch and sound of our voice when speaking. See “language content”.

=== K ===
Krashen, Stephen
Krashen’s Theory of Second Language Acquisition is a highly practical theory for communicative language learning. This notion of second language acquisition consists of five main hypotheses: the Acquisition-Learning hypothesis; the Monitor hypothesis; the Natural Order hypothesis; the Input hypothesis; and the Affective Filter hypothesis. These hypotheses represent practical interpretations of what happens in language acquisition, and they form the basis of a system of language teaching called “The Natural Method.”

=== L ===
Language content
Language has three components, which are commonly taught as language items.
1. Structural items are grammatical points about the language. CL teachers frequently introduce these as examples or model sentences, and they are often called “patterns”.
2. Phonological items are features of the sound system of the language, including intonation, word stress, rhythm and register. A common way to teach phonology is simply to have students repeat vocabulary using proper stress and pronunciation.
3. A lexical item is a new bit of vocabulary. It is sometimes difficult to decide whether an item is structural or lexical. For example, the teacher could teach phrasal verbs like “chop down” and “stand up” as lexis or structure.
Language experience approach
An approach based on teaching first language reading to young children, but adapted for use with adults. Students use vocabulary and concepts already learned to tell a story or describe an event. The teacher writes down the information they provide, and then uses the account to teach language, especially to develop reading skills.
Language learning requirements
To learn language, students have four needs: They must be exposed to the language. They must understand its meaning and structure. And they must practice it. Teachers should hold their students as able. They should not over-explain or make things too easy. Learning comes through discovery.
Language skills
In language teaching, this refers to the mode or manner in which language is used. Listening, speaking, reading and writing are generally called the four language skills. Speaking and writing are the productive skills, while reading and listening are the receptive skills. Often the skills are divided into sub-skills, such as discriminating sounds in connected speech, or understanding relationships within a sentence.
Learning burden
These are the features of the word that the teacher actually needs to be taught, and can differ dramatically from word to word. Especially in lexis, the teacher needs to reduce learning burden by, for example, reducing the number of definitions and uses presented.
Learning factors
For EFL teachers, four factors outside aptitude and attitude affect the rate at which a student learns a second language. These are (1) the student’s motivation, including whether it is instrumental or integrative; (2) the amount of time the student spends in class and practicing the language outside class; (3) the teacher’s approach to teaching; and (4) the teacher’s effectiveness and teaching style. The most important of these motivators are the first two, which are also the two the teacher has least control over. See also “aptitude”, “attitude” and “TEFL vs. TEFL”.
Lesson plan
An outline or plan that guides teaching of a lesson; includes the following: pre-assessment of class; aims and objectives; warm-up and review; engagement, study, activation of language (controlled, guided and free practice); and assessment of lesson. A good lesson plan describes procedures for student motivation and practice activities, and includes alternative ideas in case the lesson is not long enough or is too difficult. It also notes materials needed.
Lexis
See “language content”, and “vocabulary”.
Listening
See “language skills”.
Look and say
Also called the whole-word method, a method to teach reading to children, usually in their first language; has been adapted for second-language reading; words are taught in association with visuals or objects; students must always say the word so the teacher can monitor and correct pronunciation.

=== M ===
Metalanguage
Language used to describe, analyse or explain another language. Metalanguage includes, for example, grammatical terms and the rules of syntax. The term is sometimes used to mean the language used in class to give instructions, explain things, etc. – in essence, to refer to all teacher talk that does not specifically include the “target language”.
Model/modelling
To teach by example; for example, a teacher who wants students to do an activity may first demonstrate the activity, often with a student volunteer.
Motivation
In language instruction, the desire to learn. See “TEFL vs. TESL”.
Motivation paradox
Students’ main motivators are factors the teacher has little control over (integrated versus instrumental motivation, which heavily influence time on task), yet motivation is critical to learning.

=== N ===
Native speakers
Those who speak the language in question as their mother tongue.
Needs assessment
Measurement of what students need in order to learn language and achieve their language learning goals; also may include consideration of the school syllabus.
Non-native speakers
Those who speak the language in question as an additional language. The language in question is not their mother tongue.

=== O ===
Objectives
Also called lesson objectives or aims; statements of student learning outcomes based on student needs; objectives state specifically what the students will be able to do in a specified time period; objectives are measurable and therefore involve specific and discrete language skills.
Oral
Related to speaking.
Over-correction
Correcting so much that students become reluctant to try out what they have learned.

=== P ===
Paradox of language acquisition (also called The Poverty of the Stimulus)
The limited amount of comprehensible input that children receive is mathematically insufficient for them to determine grammatical principles, yet somehow they are still able to do so.
Passive vocabulary (also called receptive vocabulary)
Vocabulary that students have heard and can understand, but do not necessarily use when they speak or write.
Passive
Opposite of active; the false assumption that the language skills of reading and listening do not involve students in doing anything but receiving information.
Peer correction
Also known as peer review, peer editing, or peer feedback; in writing, an activity whereby students help each other with the editing of a composition by giving each other feedback, making comments or suggestions; can be done in pairs or small groups.
Phonemic awareness
Awareness of the sounds of English and their correspondence to written forms.
Phonology
See “language content”.
Placement tests
Tests used to place students in a specific language program; such tests should reflect program levels and expectations for students at each proficiency level offered by the language program.
Prescriptive grammar
Grammar that is described in terms of grammar rules of what is considered the best usage, often by grammarians; prescriptive grammar may not agree with what people actually say or write.
Proficiency level
Describes how well a student can use the language (often categorized as beginner, intermediate or advanced).
Proficiency tests
General tests that provide overall information on a student’s language proficiency level or ability; can be used to determine entry and exit levels of a language program or to adjust the curriculum according to the abilities of the students.

=== R ===
Rapport
Relationship, usually a harmonious one, established within a classroom between teacher and students and among students.
Realia
Real or actual objects used as teaching aids to make learning more natural; can include forms, pictures, tickets, schedules, souvenirs, advertisements and articles from English magazines or newspapers, and so on.
Recycling or spiralling
Sometimes called the cyclical approach; the purpose is to repeat language items throughout the syllabus; each time a language item is encountered more detail about it is added; this allows students to build on prior knowledge.
Register
Level of formality in speech with others; register depends on the situation, location, topic discussed, and other factors.

=== S ===
Scan
To read quickly for specific information; a reading stratagem.
Skim
To read quickly for main idea or general information; a reading stratagem.
Social context
The environment in which meanings are exchanged; can be analysed in terms of the field of discourse, which refers to what is happening, including what is being talked about; the tenor of discourse, which refers to the participants taking part in the exchange of meaning, including who they are and their relationships with each other (for example, teacher and students); and the mode of discourse, which refers to what part the language is playing in the particular situation and what “channel” (writing, speaking or a combination of the two) is being used.
Sociolinguistics
Aspects of culture that affect communication with others; examples: social class, education level, age, gender, ethnicity. Also, see “communicative competence”.
Strategic competence
See “communicative competence”.
Student and teacher
Teachers have eight roles in the classroom. They are authorities and sources of knowledge; entertainers; caregivers; role models; counsellors and sometimes friends; classroom disciplinarians; directors and managers; facilitators, coaches and guides. The most important person in the classroom is the student. The teacher’s primary focus must be on effective ways to have the student practice using his or her language. Classes should be planned so they enable the student to use just a little more language than they are comfortable with. This is known as “i+1” – an idea popularized by Stephen Krashen. This formula is short for “comprehensible input plus one.” Comprehensible input is language the students can understand.
Student feedback
Information solicited from students by the teacher to assess the effectiveness of the teaching-learning process.
Student-centred
Also called learner-centred, a way of teaching that centres on the goals, needs, interests and existing knowledge of the students. Students actively participate in such classrooms and may even be involved in setting learning outcomes. Teachers in student-centred classrooms ask students for input on their goals, needs and interests and on what they know before providing them with study topics or answers to questions (for example, grammar rules). They may also ask students to generate (help produce) materials. The teacher is seen more as a facilitator or helper than the dominant figure in the classroom.
Structure
See “language content”.
Student-generated material
Teaching material to which the students have made a major contribution; the language experience approach, for example, uses student-generated material.
Survey
To quickly read the headlines, subheads, opening and closing paragraphs, photo captions, pull quotes and other key materials in an article to get a sense of meaning; a reading stratagem.
Syllabus or curriculum
The longer-term teaching plan; includes topics that will be covered and the order in which they will be covered in a course or program of studies.
Syntax
Sometimes called word order; how words combine to form sentences and the rules governing sentence formation.

=== T ===
Tape script
A written text which accompanies listening material; may be used to make cloze passages or for student review.
Task-based syllabus
A syllabus organized around a sect of real, purposeful tasks that students are expected to carry out; tasks may include telephone use, making charts or maps, following instructions, and so on; task-based learning is purposeful and a natural way to learn language.
Teachable moments
Times in a language class in which the teacher realizes that a point of information not in the lesson plan will help students understand a language point; teachable moments digress for a brief time from the lesson plan and can be valuable in helping student learning and keeping students engaged.
Teacher talk
The language teachers use when teaching; involves simplifying speech for students; it may be detrimental to learning if it is childish or not close to the natural production of the target language.
TEFL vs. TESL
TEFL is an acronym for Teaching English as a Foreign Language; TESL, for Teaching English as a Second Language. See a fuller description at English language learning and teaching. TEFL usually takes place in non-English-speaking countries, while TESL takes place in the English-speaking world. When we speak of English as a foreign language (EFL), we are referring to the role of English for learners in a country where English is not spoken by the majority (what Braj Kachru calls the expanding circle). English as a second language (ESL) refers to the role of English for learners in an English-speaking country, i.e. usually immigrants. This difference is very important, because it strongly affects student motivation. In particular, it affects their motivation to learn. In non-English speaking countries, students have instrumental motivation, the desire to learn English to accomplish a goal. They may want to improve their job prospects, for example, or to speak to tourists. They 1. attend English classes with other non-native speakers 2. can find reasonable work without English; have less economic incentive to learn English. 3. do not need English in daily life 4. have both primary and secondary support-networks that function in their native language 5. have fewer opportunities to practice using their English They are learning, and their instructors are teaching, English as a foreign language. In English-speaking countries, they have integrative motivation, the desire to learn the language to fit into an English-language culture. They are more likely to want to integrate because they 1. Generally have more friends and family with English language skills. 2. Have immediate financial and economic incentives to learn English. 3. Have more opportunities to practice English. 4. Need it in daily life; often require it for work. 5. Often attend English classes with students who speak a wide range of mother tongues. They are learning, and their instructors are teaching, English as a second language.
Technique
A way of presenting language.
Thematic syllabus
Syllabus based on themes or topics of interest to the students.
Top-down information processing
Students learn partially through top-down information processing, or processing based on how students make sense of language input – for example, through using students’ previous knowledge or schema.

=== U ===
Uninterrupted sustained silent writing
A technique in writing whereby a specified, relatively short period of time is set aside in class for students to practice their writing without being interrupted. This helps build writing fluency.

=== V ===
Vocabulary, importance of
Core vocabulary (the most common 2,000-3,000 English words) needs to be heavily stressed in language teaching. There is no point in presenting exotic vocabulary until students have mastered basic, high-frequency words. Learners should be tested on high-frequency word lists for passive knowledge, active production and listening comprehension. Learners cannot comprehend or speak at a high level without these words as a foundation. Learners need to spend time practicing these words until they are automatic; this is known as building automaticity. Since there is often not enough class time for much word practice, teachers need to present their students with strategies for developing automaticity outside the classroom.
Vocabulary-based syllabus
Syllabus built around vocabulary; often associated with the grammatical syllabus and the grammar translation method.

=== W ===
Worksheets
Teacher-developed, paper-based activities to help students comprehend, use, and learn language; can be used in association with all skill levels and in individual and group work.

== See also ==
- Language education
- CALL
- Monolingual learners' dictionaries
- English language
- Grammar
- Language
- Learning by teaching
- Learning by teaching in German
- Linguistics
- Second language
- Second language acquisition
- Common European Framework of Reference for Languages
- American Council on the Teaching of Foreign Languages
- English language learning and teaching
- UNIcert
