= ACUPARI =

Peruvian–German language school

- Asociación Cultural Peruano Alemana Región Inca
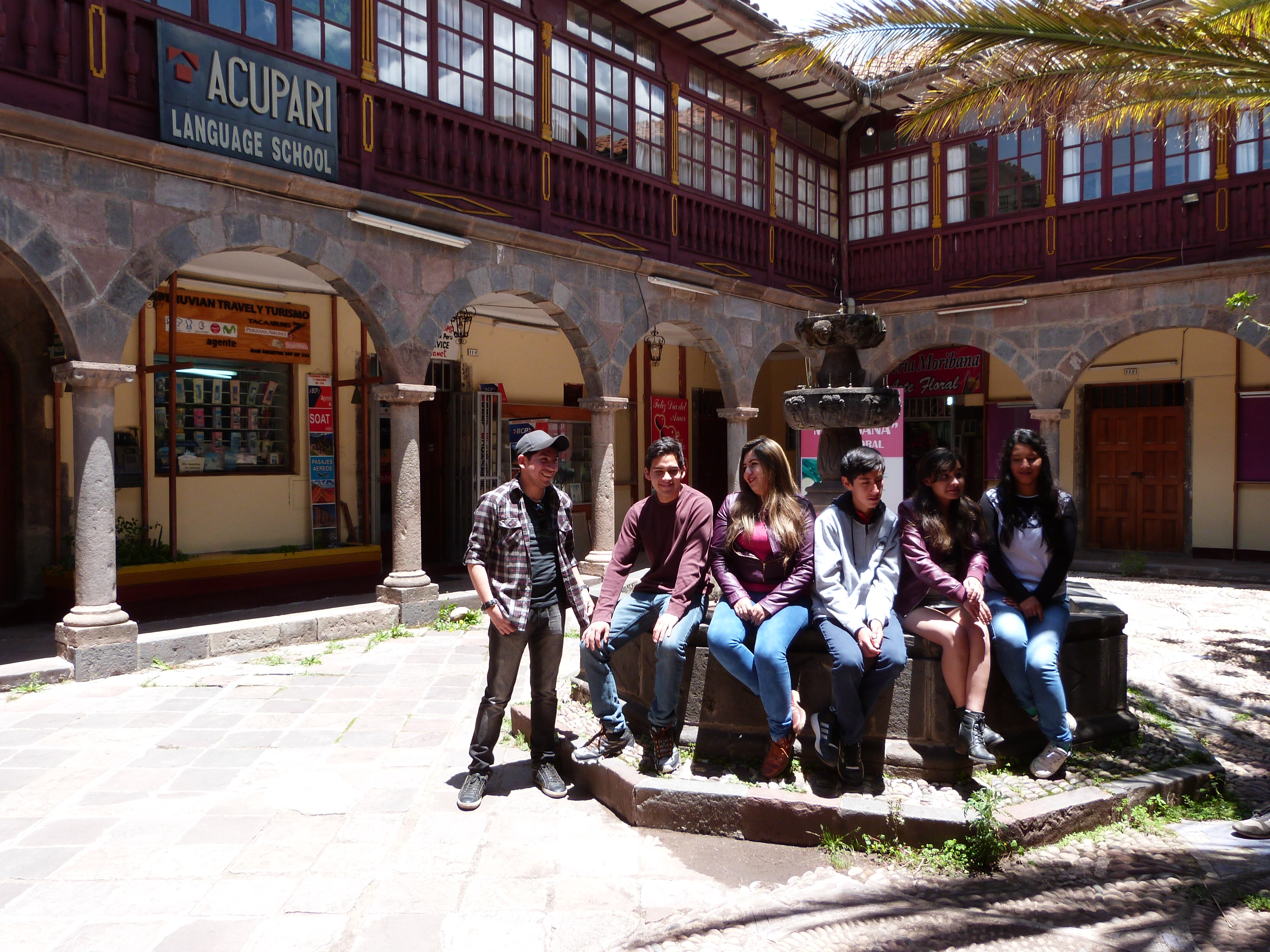
- Students in the courtyard of the language school
- Abbreviation: ACUPARI
- Founded: 1990
- Type: Cultural association and language school
- Purpose: Language education and intercultural exchange
- Headquarters: Cusco, Peru
- Official languages: German, Spanish, Quechua
- Affiliations: Goethe-Institut, TANDEM International
- Website: www.acupari.com/en/

ACUPARI (Asociación Cultural Peruano Alemana Región Inca), or German Peruvian Cultural Association, is the responsible body of the language school of the same name for German, Spanish and Quechua in Cusco, Peru. The aim of the organization is to develop the intercultural dialogue between these two countries. For this reason ACUPARI partners with the Goethe-Institut and is a certified member of the network for language schools TANDEM International.

== Organisation ==
The language school was founded in 1990. It is located in a former colonial building in the old city centre of Cusco. The language classes comply with the guidelines of the Common European Framework of Reference for Languages (CEFR). A varied cultural out-of-class programme facilitates cultural exchange between Peruvians and Germans. The director of ACUPARI is the German honorary consul Maria-Sophia Jürgens.

== Language Courses ==
=== Spanish Courses ===
ACUPARI offers Spanish classes designed for tourists, volunteers, interns and professionals. The selection is between private classes or group lessons for either one trial lesson, a full week or up to half a year. It is possible to learn the basics of the Spanish language for travelling reasons in Peru and South America in a relatively short time. Learning Spanish in order to use it in familial or job context takes a little more time. The teachers in ACUPARI are native speakers. In addition to the classes you can join the Tandem programme, go on excursions to the region around Cusco and take Salsa lessons. ACUPARI also finds Peruvian host families for people who are interested to get to know Peruvian life more closely.

=== German Courses ===
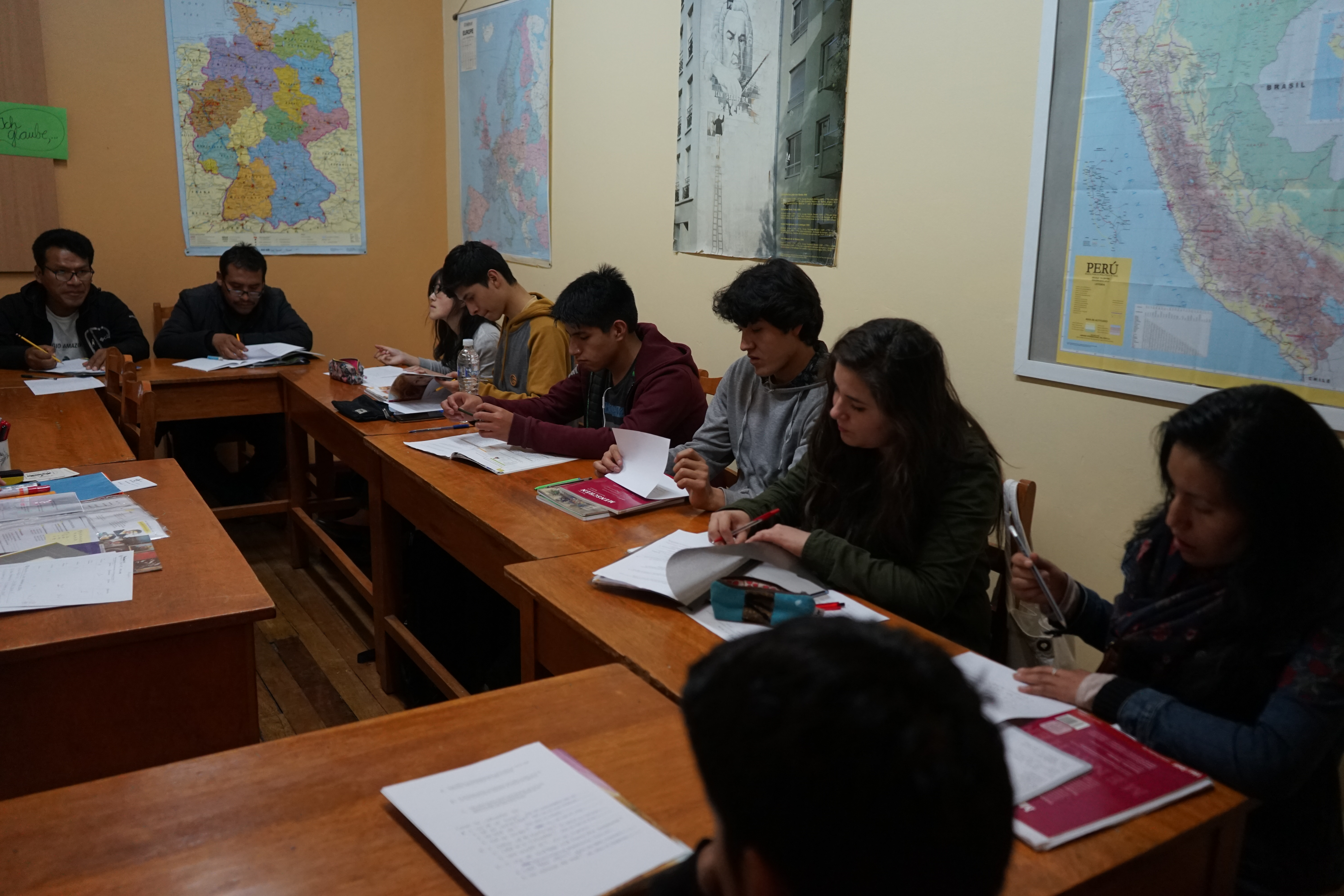
German Classes in ACUPARI

People who learn German in ACUPARI are usually young Peruvians who are working with German tourists or who are interested in studying or working in Germany. The course levels respond to the Common European Framework of Reference for Languages A1, A2, B1, B2, C1, C2. They take place in the morning, late afternoon and evening. The teachers are usually from Germany, sometimes from Austria or Switzerland. They own a DaF (German as a Foreign Language) licence. ACUPARI divides the year into four trimesters each lasting eleven weeks. At the end of each course there is an exam according to the level of the course. ACUPARI provides advice for students who plan to work or study in Germany. Once a year a scholarship is granted for a month of German classes in a Goethe-Institut in Germany.

==== Official Goethe-Institut Test Centre ====
In order to evaluate the language skills of learners of the German Language internationally the Goethe-Institut offers certifications that are recognized worldwide. A standardized exam evaluates the language competence of the individual. ACUPARI holds the official license from the Goethe-Institut to offer these exams. There are preparation courses for all levels from A1 to C2.

=== Quechua Courses ===
ACUPARI offers Quechua Courses in order to foster the old language of the Incas and prevent language extinction. The indigenous language of the Andes calls itself Runasimi, with runa from “human being” and simi from “word, mouth”. It is above all a spoken language. It was only in the 16th century that Dominican friar Fray Domingo de Santo Tomás wrote a grammar book for Quechua. Today the Academia Mayor de la Lengua Quechua is in charge of the cultivation of the written language. There are also Online-Dictionaries for Quechua nowadays. Even learning Quechua for a short time offers a valuable access to the old Peruvian culture.

== Tandem Programme ==
The Tandem principle in intercultural language learning is derived from the typical bike for two. A Peruvian and a German native speaker get together in order to support each other in their language learning process. ACUPARI helps students to find their Tandem. From then on the Tandem couple is free to choose where and when they want to meet. Apart from practicing each other’s languages, the meetings also serve to better understand Peruvian and German culture.

== Accommodation in host families ==
ACUPARI works with local families, who host students, pick them up from the airport and show them the way to school. The families speak Spanish, provide breakfast and WIFI and answer student questions about Cusco and Peru.

== Children’s Book Project ==
In order to support literacy development in Peru, ACUPARI started a Children’s Book Project called "Books for 70 schools“. The Andean village schools around Cusco all receive 25 children’s books for their libraries for free. Each new story results from a literary competition. Peruvian authors who have not published any book before can hand in their children stories during a two-month period. A jury selects the best story for children aged six to twelve. The winner receives a price and his story will be illustrated and printed in Spanish and Quechua. Until now ACUPARI has printed and distributed four books.

== Volunteering ==
Another service ACUPARI offers is to find jobs for people who want to do voluntary work in Cusco and the region. The school is in touch with many local charitable or non-profit organizations. Special Spanish courses beforehand prepare volunteers for their work. Organisations that can be joined reach from local hospitals, orphanages, schools and kinder gardens to the Puerto Maldonado Lodge.

== Cultural Activities ==
As Cultural Association ACUPARI organizes and supports many cultural activities apart from German and Spanish classes. Students can watch German movies in the evenings, take Salsa lessons and get to know new friends in Café Berlin or on excursions to the region. In addition ACUPARI sponsors different concerts in Cusco and makes known and attends local cultural activities.

== Counselling for students ==
In ACUPARI students who want to study or work in Germany can receive counselling. The staff members answer questions about assessment requirements in German universities and inform about language certificates needed. They also know about finances and offer support for au-pair placements.
