= English-language education in Japan =

English-language education in Japan began as early as 1600 with the initial contacts between the Japanese and Europeans. Almost all students graduating from high school in Japan have had several years of English language education; however, many still do not have fluent English conversation abilities.

== History ==
The earliest record of the initial contact between the Japanese and a native English speaker took place around 1600, when it is believed that Tokugawa Ieyasu, founder of the Tokugawa Feudal Government, met with Englishman William Adams. Although it is reported that the only interpreter between the two men was only well-versed in the Portuguese language, it did not stop Tokugawa Ieyasu from having a very positive relationship with William Adams, who remained in Japan for the remainder of his life.

However, after the death of Tokugawa Ieyasu in 1616, a change in the foreign policy of the Bakufu ordered the closing of the English merchants' office in 1623, which consequently prompted the English to leave Japan. The English were refused permission to return in 1673. In 1808, the British ship Phaeton seized goods in Nagasaki, and by 1825, the Bakufu ordered the feudal lords to repel all foreign ships, except the Dutch and Chinese.

The first translation of any English grammar book into Japanese was accomplished by Shibukawa Rokuzo, a high-ranking official of the Bakufu who had studied Dutch, in 1841, when he translated Murray's English Grammar from Dutch into Japanese. Then in 1848, American Ranald MacDonald came to Japan, after pretending to be shipwrecked, and taught English to fourteen official Japanese interpreters of Dutch in Nagasaki under Bakufu orders. It would be one of MacDonald's students, named Moriyama, who would act as interpreter between the United States and Japan in order to establish trade relations.

After being rescued from a shipwreck and studying in the United States for ten years, Nakahama Manjirō wrote an English textbook called Ei-Bei Taiwa Shokei (A Shortcut to Anglo-American Conversation), which used Japanese kana for pronunciation and the kanbun (Chinese classics) word-order system. This text would later become influential in shaping the methods of teaching and learning English in Japan.

Yokohama Academy, one of the first English schools, was founded in Japan by the Bakufu in 1865 where American missionaries such as James Curtis Hepburn taught there. By the year 1874, there were 91 foreign language schools in Japan, out of which 82 of them taught English. And in 1923, Englishman Harold E. Palmer was invited to Japan by the Ministry of Education, where he would later found the Institute for Research in English Teaching in Tokyo and introduce the aural-oral approach to teaching English. However, beginning from the 1880s, when Japan was quickly becoming a modernized country, books such as Shiga Shigetaka's Nihon Jin (にほんじん or 日本人) (The Japanese People) began to surface in order to warn the Japanese public about the alleged dangers of Western influences. Hence, up until the end of World War II, there was a growing tension between Western ideology and national pride amongst the Japanese people.

In modern Japan, there seems to be conflicting views over how the Japanese people view the English language. On one side, it appears that there is much interest in acquiring a working knowledge of the English language, which can be demonstrated by the annual rise in STEP Eiken applicants and the number of Japanese media outlets that have begun to incorporate English-language programs into their repertoire, in order to participate in the global economy and international community. While at the same time, writers such as Henry J. Hughes and Mike Guest point out that Japan maintains itself as one of the most independent nations on Earth due to its geographic isolation and amazing translation industry, which results in hardly any need for English in daily life.

The modern English-language industry has recently experienced an incredible boom, followed by a number of hardships, including declarations of bankruptcy for two very large English conversation school chains.

== Difficulties ==
Japanese students experience great difficulty in studying English, due to fundamental differences in grammar and syntax, as well as important differences in pronunciation. Japanese word order, the frequent omission of subjects in Japanese, the absence of articles, the functional absence of plural forms, as well as difficulties in distinguishing l and r all contribute to substantial problems using English effectively. Indeed, the Japanese have tended to score comparatively poorly on international tests of English.

An additional factor has been the use of English in daily life for aesthetic appeal rather than for functional purposes. That is, for Japanese consumption, not for English speakers per se, and as a way of appearing "smart, sophisticated and modern". Indeed, it is claimed that in such decorative English "there is often no attempt to try to get it right, nor do the vast majority of the Japanese population ... ever attempt to read the English design element in question ... There is therefore less emphasis on spell checking and grammatical accuracy." Thus exposure to English encountered in daily life in Japan is unlikely to be helpful as a learning aid.

Another difficulty is the potential fear that allowing the English language to assimilate into Japan will take away its distinctiveness and force them to comply with Western culture. They see the English language as an extension of Western civilization. The English language is seen as an aggressive and individualistic language, which is the opposite of the Japanese language and culture. For a more reserved Japanese citizen to force themself to be more 'outgoing' and 'outspoken' when they speak English, it is a direct conflict of how they should talk in the Japanese government's minds. If students learn to speak more 'outspokenly' and 'individualistically' too young, it might affect their Japanese speaking skills and influence their native language too strongly. It could cause the Japanese language to become Westernized instead of staying pure and strictly only Japanese.

== School system ==
According to the Ministry of Finance (Japan), in the 2004 fiscal year (FY) the General Account expenditures for measures related to education and science were ¥6,133.0 billion (or roughly $70.8 billion). Japan is ranked 22nd in the world in the UN Education Index, but scores highly in science according to PISA.

MEXT took steps beginning in 1998 for a select number of public primary schools to have mandatory English classes; many Japanese parents send their children to Eikaiwa schools starting even before elementary school. According to 2003 statistics provided by MEXT children from ages 12 to 14 spend roughly 90 hours annually in a school classroom setting.

Traditionally, the Japanese have used the grammar-translation method, thanks in part to Nakahama Manjirō's kanbun system, to teach their students how to learn the English language. However, there are innovative ways that have been adapted into and outside the classroom setting where mobile phones and pop culture have been used to teach Japanese students.

In April 2011 English instruction became compulsory starting in the 5th grade of elementary school (age 10).

It is planned to make English activity classes mandatory for third- and fourth-graders, and turn them into full-fledged lessons for fifth- and sixth-graders by 2020.

== Private sector ==
Private language schools for English are known as eikaiwa. The largest of these chains were Aeon, GEOS, and ECC; only ECC and AEON have not yet filed for bankruptcy. The industry is not well regulated. Nova, originally by far the largest chain with over 900 branches in Japan, collapsed in October 2007, leaving thousands of foreign teachers without money or a place to live. Other teachers work in universities, although most university positions now require a graduate degree or higher.

Agencies, known in Japan as haken, or dispatch companies, are increasingly used to send English speakers into kindergartens, primary schools, and private companies whose employees need to improve their English for business. Agencies have recently been competing fiercely to get contracts from various boards of education for elementary, junior and senior high schools, so wages for teachers have decreased steadily in the last four years.

Average wages for teachers in Japan are now under ¥250,000 per month, although that can rise slightly depending on experience. Along with wages, working conditions have also steadily declined, resulting in industrial action and court battles that have made the news in local and international press.

== JET Programme ==
Employees of the Japan Exchange and Teaching Programme are sponsored by the Government of Japan to assist language teachers at Japanese high schools and elementary schools in Japanese cities and rural countryside.

== Cultural differences ==
When it comes to communicating in English, many Japanese students tend to become anxious about possibly stumbling over their words or not making themselves clear; therefore, they shy away from speaking English altogether. However, by addressing the anxieties of the students, the English instructor can help to come up with cognitive, effective, and behavioral strategies in which students can use to cope with the anxiety they experience in English-language classrooms. "Demotivation can negatively influence the learner's attitudes and behaviors, degrade classroom group dynamics and teacher's motivation, and result in long-term and widespread negative learning outcomes." In addition to helping students out with their anxieties, the teacher should also have a good idea about the students' learning strategies and their motivation, in order that he or she can focus on "positive motivations [that] will be helpful to the students in acquiring new information and decrease the effects of negative motivations which can interfere with the students' second language acquisition".

== See also ==
- Wasei-eigo
- Gairaigo
- Glossary of language teaching terms and ideas
- Ministry of Education, Culture, Sports, Science and Technology
- Teaching English as a foreign language
