= Gertrude Moskowitz =

American teacher (1928–2021)

Gertrude Moskowitz (1928–2021) was an American teacher, professor of foreign-language education, mentor, author, conference speaker and film strip editor. She used student-centered, participatory approaches in her work as a teacher and teacher of teachers. She is credited with influencing the teaching practices of foreign language teachers and teacher trainers worldwide by making them more interactive and by encouraging self-evaluation. She is notable for being a foremother of humanistic language learning, teaching and teacher training.

== Early life and education ==
Gertrude ‘Trudy’ Rothenstein was born on April 14, 1928, in Toledo, Ohio, USA. Her mother was Ida Rothenstein and her father Hyman, both Russian immigrants to the USA. She attended Ohio State University where, in 1949, she graduated summa cum laude in Education. She went on to Temple University in Philadelphia, Pennsylvania where she gained a Masters in Education in 1961. For her PhD in 1966, she received the Phi Delta Gamma Doctoral Award, Honorary Mention for Outstanding Contribution to Research Scholarship, and Community Activities.

== Professional career ==
Moskowitz taught Spanish in elementary and secondary schools from 1949 to 50. From 1959 to 1964, she taught Spanish and lectured in Secondary Education at Temple University She was assistant professor of curriculum and instruction from 1966 to 1974. For the following 26 years she was one of the first female, tenured, full professors at Temple University, working as professor of Secondary Education. As many of her students worked during the day, Moskowitz mostly taught in the evening and ran weekend workshops. She was known for her 24-hour accessibility and personal attention.

Influenced by Earl Stevick, Moskowitz turned the traditional graduate school class into a more personal, participatory, and student-centered space. She incorporated the Flanders System of Interaction Analysis (FSIA) in her work as a teacher and a teacher supervisor. The system was developed by Ned Flanders and focuses primarily on the behavior of the teacher, observing it and categorizing the verbal interactions in a class. Moskowitz adapted and expanded it into what is called Foreign Language Interaction (FLINT). The usual personal observations by and advice from the supervisor in a teacher feedback session are replaced by the teacher self-evaluating against their own goals. FLINT continues to be used for the analysis of teacher discourse in foreign language classes.

In the 1970s and early 80s Moskowitz spoke at conferences and led workshops in Canada, Israel, Mexico, and Japan. In 1978 she published Caring and Sharing in the Foreign Language Class: A Sourcebook on Humanistic Techniques. The book contained scores of practical teaching ideas designed to encourage student engagement and motivation. The book and her FLINT analysis of class discourse have had a lasting influence on humanistic language teachers and researchers worldwide.

Moskowitz prepared Peace Corp volunteers for overseas work and also helped doctors with their bedside manner by encouraging them to pay attention to the personal and human aspects of their communication with patients. In 1981, Moskowitz was awarded the Educator of the Year Award by the Pennsylvania State Modern Language Association. Moskowitz continued as a workshop leader and plenary speaker into the late 1990s. She also worked as an educational consultant to school districts and universities.

== Personal life ==
In 1950 Gertrude ‘Trudy’ Rothenstein married Merle Moskowitz, whom she had met at college. They later divorced. They had two daughters, Jan and Lynne. Moskowitz died on October 10, 2021, aged 93.

== Selected publications ==
- Toward Human Relations in Supervision 1966 National Association of Secondary School Principals Vol 50 Issue 314
- The Effects of Training in Interaction Analysis on the Behavior of Secondary School Teachers in The High School Journal, vol. 51, no. 1, 1967, pp. 17–25. University of North Carolina Press JSTOR, http://www.jstor.org/stable/40366846.
- The FLINT System (Foreign Language Interaction System) An Observational Tool for the Foreign Language Class in the Classroom Interaction Newsletter, vol. 3, no. 2, 1968, pp. 1–5. JSTOR, http://www.jstor.org/stable/23887553.
- The foreign language teacher interacts 1968 Association for Productive Teaching ISBN B0007GYWN8
- Interaction Analysis—A New Modern Language for Supervisors 1971 in Foreign Language Annals Volume 5, Issue 2 p. 211-221
- Interaction Analysis: A New Modern Language for Supervisors in Brown (2001) Teaching by Principles: An Interactive Approach to Language Pedagogy. New York: Addison Wesley Longman, Inc. . Mousavi, S. N. (2021).
- Interaction Analysis Gives Insight into Student-Teacher Exchanges. Georgia State Univ., Atlanta. In Foreign Language Beacon Vol. 7 No.3 pp10–13 Spring 1972
- Interaction Goes International in TESOL Quarterly Vol. 6. No. 2 June 1972, pp. 167–178 Published By: Teachers of English to Speakers of Other Languages, Inc. (TESOL) https://doi.org/10.2307/3586072
- Caring and Sharing in the Foreign Language Class 1978 Heinle and Heinle Publishers ISBN 978-0838427712

== Filmography ==
Moskowitz also produced a filmstrip, Don’t Smile Till Christmas: A Story of Classroom Interaction.
