= Earl Stevick =

American linguist (1923–2013)

- Born: October 23, 1923; Sioux City, Iowa
- Died: August 13, 2013 (aged 89); Lexington, Virginia
- Spouse: Betty Rae Culp Stevick (m. 1948)

Academic background
- Education: Harvard University (B.A.); Columbia University (M.A.); Cornell University (Ph.D.)

Academic work
- Discipline: Linguist
- Institutions: Scarritt College for Christian Workers; Foreign Service Institute
- Main interests: Second-language acquisition; Language pedagogy; Languages of Africa

Earl Wilson Stevick (/ˈstiːvɪk/; October 23, 1923 – August 13, 2013) was an expert in language learning and teaching. Stevick was influential in developing the communicative approach to language learning. He was a practicing Christian and his approach to education was very much influenced by his faith.

== Academic career ==
Earl Stevick studied government at Harvard University, earned a Master of Arts in Teaching English as a Foreign Language at Columbia University, and a PhD in linguistics at Cornell University. After he received his PhD, Stevick began teaching at Scarritt College for Christian Workers in Nashville, Tennessee. He applied for and received a Ford Fellowship and went to teach in Angola, Belgian Congo (now the Democratic Republic of the Congo) and Southern Rhodesia (now Zimbabwe) for two years. He then worked for the U.S. State Department’s Foreign Service Institute, creating courses to learn African languages.

As a linguist, Stevick was particularly interested in recording the tones of African tonal languages. In the language courses which he edited for the Foreign Service Institute, Washington, especially in the courses of Yoruba, Chinyanja, Shona, Kirundi, and Luganda, the tones are marked with a detail and precision not seen in previous grammars.

Stevick was one of a small group of language educators who created the Master of Arts in Teaching degree at the SIT Graduate Institute in 1969. It was called the School for International Training at that time. He continued to help with that program as a member of the advisory board. Stevick's person-centered approach to education influenced humanistic foreign language educators such as Gertrude Moskowitz.

== Family ==
Stevick married Betty Rae Culp in 1948. At the time of his death he had eight grandchildren and six great-grandchildren.

== Publications ==
- Stevick, Earl W. (1959). "Inflection of the Manyika verb". Nada: The Southern Rhodesia Native Affairs Department Annual 36. 30–45
- Stevick, Earl W. (1960). "The implosive-explosive contrast in Manyika". African Studies, 19, 2.
- Stevick, Earl W. & Kingston Machiwana (1960). Manyika Step-by-Step. Central Mission Press, Cleveland.
- Stevick, Earl W. (1963). Bambara Basic Course. Foreign Service Institute, Washington
- Stevick, Earl W., J.G. Mlela & F.N. Njenga (1963). Swahili Basic Course. Foreign Service Institute, Washington
- Stevick, Earl W. & Olaleye Aremu (1963). Yoruba Basic Course. Foreign Service Institute, Washington
- Stevick, Earl W. (1963). A workbook in language teaching : with special reference to English as a foreign language. New York, Abingdon Press.
- Stevick, Earl W. (1964). "Two Bantu consonant systems". Language, vol. 40, no.1
- Stevick, Earl W. (1965). "Pitch and duration in two Yoruba idiolects".Journal of African Languages 4(2), 1965
- Stevick, Earl W. & Linda Hollander (1965). Chinyanja Basic Course. Foreign Service Institute, Washington
- Stevick, Earl W., M. Mataranyika & L. Mataranyika (1965) Shona Basic Course. Foreign Service Institute, Washington
- Stevick, Earl W., Raymond Setukuru & others (1965) Kirundi Basic Course. Foreign Service Institute, Washington
- Stevick, Earl W. & Aremu, Olaleye (1965) Fula Basic Course. Foreign Service Institute, Washington.
- Indakwa, John & Stevick, Earl W. (1966). Swahili : an Active Introduction : General Conversation. Foreign Service Institute, Washington.
- Indakwa, John & Stevick, Earl W. (1966). Swahili : an Active Introduction : Geography. Foreign Service Institute, Washington.
- Stevick, Earl W. (1966) The substantive paradigms of Manyika. African Studies, 25, 3.
- Stevick, Earl W. (1967) "The teaching of African languages in the United States since 1961". African Studies Bulletin 10, 1, 16-21.
- Kamoga, Fred[erick] Katabazi & Earl W. Stevick (1968). Luganda Basic Course. Foreign Service Institute, Washington
- Stevick, Earl W. (1969) "Pitch and duration in Ganda". Journal of African Languages 8.1-28.
- Stevick, Earl W. (1969) "Tone in Bantu". International Journal of American Linguistics Vol. 35, No. 4.
- Stevick, Earl W. & Fred[erick] Katabazi Kamoga (1970). Luganda Pretraining Program. Foreign Service Institute, Washington
- Stevick, Earl W. (1971) "Adapting and Writing Language Lessons" Foreign Service Institute, Washington
- Stevick, Earl W. (1976) Memory, Meaning and Method (1976 & 1996 editions). Thomson Heinle Newbury House ELT.
- Stevick, Earl W. (1980) Teaching Languages, A Way and Ways. Heinle
- Stevick, Earl W. (1982) Teaching and Learning Languages. Cambridge University Press
- Stevick, Earl W. (1984) Double Action English. Addison-Wesley.
- Stevick, Earl W. (1986) Images and Options in the Language Classroom (Cambridge Language Teaching Library). Cambridge University Press.
- Stevick, Earl W. (1990) Success With Foreign Languages: Seven Who Achieved It and What Worked for Them Prentice-Hall International Language Teaching Methodology Series
- Stevick, Earl W. (1990) Humanism in Language Teaching: A Critical Perspective (New perspectives: personal & professional development for teachers). Oxford University Press.
- Stevick, Earl W. (1992) Crossroads 2 (Students Book). Oxford University Press.
- Stevick, Earl W. (1998) Working with Teaching Methods: What's at Stake?. Thomson Heinle
- Stevick, Earl W. (2002) Afterwords : A Collection of Miscellaneous Short Pieces Mostly Written since 1998 (published on the website of the Christian English Language Educators Association (CELEA))
- Stevick, Earl W. (with Kristjánsson, C.) (2009). "Afterword: The dilemma". In M. S. Wong & S. Canagarajah (Eds.), Christian and critical English language educators in dialogue: Pedagogical and ethical dilemmas (pp. 292–297). New York: Routledge.
- Stevick, Earl W. (with Kristjánsson, C.) (2013). "Faiths and practices in language teaching." Journal of Christianity and Foreign Languages, 14, 64-86.
