= UNIcert =

System of certification

The UNIcert is an international system of certification and accreditation for various languages learnt in a university context. The main goal of UNIcert is to support language education for universities and to provide an accepted certificate that proves language knowledge outside universities.

The system was set up in 1992 by the German "Association of Language Centres, Language Teaching Institutes and Institutes of Foreign Languages" (Arbeitskreis der Sprachenzentren, Sprachlehrinstitute und Fremdspracheninstitute, AKS). This association acts as a forum for the exchange of information, experience and ideas between institutes and people involved in language work at universities and training institutes, and those taking part in research into language teaching and learning. More than 100 language centres in Germany, Austria and Switzerland are members of the association. The AKS is also one of the founding members of CERCLES, the European Confederation of Language Centres in Higher Education, "a confederation of independent associations from 21 countries of Europe".

== Levels ==
The levels correspond to levels of the Common European Framework of Reference for Languages

- UNIcert Basis (European Level A2)
- UNIcert I (European Level B1) - basic knowledge of the language.
- UNIcert II (European Level B2) - extended (field of study specific) knowledge of the language (for studying in a foreign country).
- UNIcert III (European Level C1) - extended (field of study specific) knowledge of the language for postgraduate (for example doctorate) studies in a foreign country.
- UNIcert IV (European Level C2) - (field of study specific) knowledge on the level of an academic native speaker.

== Education ==
UNIcert language courses must be taught in small interactive groups. The courses teach written and oral language. A certificate is received subject to satisfactory attendance, and oral and written exam results. For higher UNIcert levels an internship in a foreign country or study in a foreign country is recommended.

== Certificate ==
The certificate is issued in the language of the country where the certification is received, in English and in the language studied. It includes a detailed description of the language knowledge and grades of the applicant.

== Accreditation ==
Institutions offering UNIcert are accredited on a regular basis. This accreditation confirms that the institutions are able to offer a modern language education at university level. Without accreditation they are not allowed to offer UNIcert courses.
