= List of Active-Language Classicists =

List of Classicists who actively speak Classical languages

This page lists classicists who have devoted significant professional effort into speaking Classical languages in an active way, for conversation, teaching, and other spontaneous verbal communication.

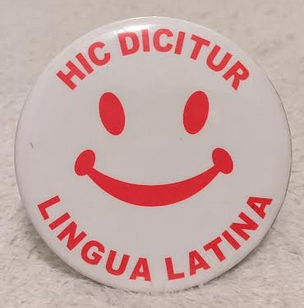
"Latin Spoken Here" in Latin (Hic Dicitur Lingua Latina) on a pin-back button

Many of these individuals have careers in academia, but not all of them. They work as scholars, instructors, organizers, authors, or academic researchers.

The listed individuals are distinctive because the majority of Classics scholars in modern times devote little effort to speaking Classical languages. In fact they frequently discourage this activity as mostly a waste of time. The individuals listed here are notable exceptions.

For the purpose of this list, we use the same definition of "Classical languages" as is used at Classics departments major European and North American universities, and indeed the same definition used at the Wikipedia Classics page: Latin and Ancient Greek.

However, specialists in other classical languages can also be listed here, provided that their professional activity is the same: The active use of one or several ancient and probably dead classical languages as spoken, conversational languages.

== Individuals ==
Name	Lifespan	Professional description	Institutional affiliation(s)	Location(s)	Language(s)
Arcadius Avellanus, Mogyoróssy Arkád	1851–1935	scholar, teacher, editor, organizer	Professor at St. John's College in Brooklyn	Hungary; U.S.	Latin
Stephen Berard		author, classicist, organizer	Wenatchee Valley College, Conventiculum Vasintoniense, Septimana Californiana	Washington, U.S.	Latin
John Stuart Blackie	1809–1895	classical scholar and man of letters	Prof. of Greek at Edinburgh U; Prof. of Humanities at U. of Aberdeen	Scotland	Ancient Greek, Latin
Jean Capelle (politician)	1909–1983	politician	First international congress for living Latin (Avignon, 1956); French Ministry of National Education	France	Latin
Juan Coderch		classicist	University of St Andrews; Author of Akropolis World News (AWK)	U.K.	Greek
Luca Desiata, Lucas Cupidus, Λουκᾶς Δεσιάτα	1971–	classicist, author, organizer, puzzlemaker	Founder of Hebdomada Aenigmatum and Ὀνόματα Kεχιασμένα	Italy	Latin, Greek
Carlo Egger	1914–2003	Catholic abbott; classicist	Latinitas Foundation; Vatican Secretariat of State	South Tyrol, Italy; Rome, Italy	Latin
Reginald Foster	1939–2020	Catholic priest; renowned teacher of spoken Latin	Vatican Secretariat of State; Gregorian University	Rome, Italy; Wisconsin, U.S.	Latin
Alexis Hellmer	1984–	classicist	Founder of Studium Angelopolitanum; Rusticatio Virginiana; Conventiculum Bostoniense	Mexico	Latin
Stephen Hill		classicist, teacher	Wyoming Catholic College; Polis Institute	U.S.	Ancient Greek, Latin
Eduard Johnson; E. Joannides, Georg Capellanus	1840–1903	classicist, teacher, author, journalist and local historian	Plauen Gymnasium; Chemnitz Gymnasium; Vogtländische Anzeiger (local German newspaper)	Saxony, Germany	Ancient Greek, Latin
John Byron Kuhner		writer, teacher	Editor of In Medias Res; Former president of SALVI; owner of Bookmarx Books in Ohio	Ohio, U.S.	Latin; Rusticatio Virginiana
Leni Ribeiro Leite		classicist	Federal University of Espírito Santo; U. of Kentucky; Conventiculum Lexingtoniense	Kentucky, U.S.; Brazil	Latin
Nancy Llewellyn; Magistra Annula		classicist	Founder of SALVI; Belmont Abbey College; Wyoming Catholic College; Veterum Sapienta Institute; Pontifical Salesian University; Rusticatio Virginiana	Rome, Italy; CA/WY/NC U.S.	Latin
Tatiana Marvina		teacher	Polis Institute	Jerusalem, Israel	Ancient Greek
Milena Minkova		classicist, author	Pontifical Gregorian University; Pontifical Salesian University; U. of Kentucky; Academia Latinitati Fovendae (ALF); Conventiculum Lexingtoniense, Conventiculum Dickinsoniense	Kentucky, U.S.; Rome, Italy	Latin
Luigi Miraglia	1965–	teacher, classicist	Founder of the Accademia Vivarium Novum; Academia Latinitati Fovendae (ALF); Pontifical Academy for Latin	Rome, Italy	Latin
Tuomo Pekkanen	1934–	classicist	Professor at Jyväskylä University; Founder of Nuntii Latini; Academia Latinitati Fovendae (ALF);	Helsinki, Finland	Latin
Luke Amadeus Ranieri, Scorpio Martianus		teacher, author, prolific YouTuber	Ancient Language Institute; Paideia Institute; Polis Institute	U.S.	Latin, Ancient Greek
Christophe Rico		classicist, author, dean	Dean of the Polis Institute; University of Strasbourg	Jerusalem, Israel	Ancient Greek, Latin (and others)
Pietro Romanelli	1889–1991	archaeologist	Founder and leader of Academia Latinitati Fovendae (ALF)	Rome, Italy	Latin
W. H. D. Rouse	1863–1950	teacher, translator, author, headmaster	Cambridge University; Association for the Reform of Latin Teaching; Loeb Classical Library editor; Rugby School; The Perse School (headmaster)	U.K.	Latin
Wilfried Stroh; Valahfridus Stroh; Valahfridus Strutius	1939–2025	philologist, academic	LMU Munich; Academia Latinitati Fovendae (ALF)	Munich, Germany	Latin
Tim Smith		author, teacher, youtuber, podcaster	SALVI; Biduum Coloratanum; Loveland Classical Schools	U.S.	Latin
Jenny Teichmann		teacher, organizer, YouTuber	Argos Didaskei; Paideia Institute; Τρίοδος Trivium	Germany	Ancient Greek
John Traupman	1923–2019	classicist, author	Saint Joseph's University	Philadelphia, U.S.	Latin
Terence Tunberg	1950–	classicist, author	U. of Kentucky; Academia Latinitati Fovendae (ALF); Conventiculum Lexingtoniense, Conventiculum Dickinsoniense	Kentucky, U.S.	Latin
Karl Heinrich Ulrichs	1825–1895	lawyer, jurist, journalist, writer, early gay rights activist	district court of Hildesheim; Accademia Pontaniana (Naples, Italy)	Germany; Italy	Latin

== See also ==
- Academia Latinitati Fovendae
- Pontifical Academy for Latin
- Vita Latina
- Latinitas Foundation
- Accademia Vivarium Novum
- Classics
- Latin
  - Neo-Latin
  - Living Latin / Active Latin
- Ancient Greek
  - Attic Greek
  - Koine Greek
  - Modern Use
  - Experimental Ancient Greek wiki:
    - Κυρία Δέλτος (main page) (wiki incubator)
    - Index of pages (wiki incubator)
- Language revitalization
- Erasmus of Rotterdam
