= Contemporary Latin =

Form of the Latin language used since the 19th century

- Latinitas hodierna
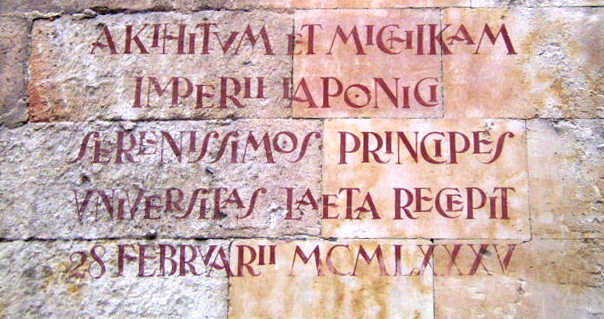
- A contemporary Latin inscription at Salamanca University commemorating the visit of Prince Akihito and Princess Michiko of Japan in 1985 (MCMLXXXV)
- Region: Europe
- Language family: Indo-European: Italic; Latino-Faliscan; Latin; Contemporary Latin
- Early forms: Proto-Indo-European: Proto-Italic; Proto-Latino-Faliscan; Old Latin; Classical Latin; Late Latin; Medieval Latin; Renaissance Latin; Neo-Latin
- Writing system: Latin alphabet

Language codes
- ISO 639-1: la
- ISO 639-2: lat
- ISO 639-3: lat
- Glottolog: None

Contemporary Latin is the form of the Literary Latin used since the end of the 19th century. Various kinds of contemporary Latin can be distinguished, including the use of Neo-Latin words in taxonomy and in science generally, and the fuller ecclesiastical use in the Catholic Church – but Living, or Spoken, Latin (Latin used as a language in its own right as a full-fledged means of expression) is the primary subject of this article.

== Token Latin ==
Latin is still present in words or phrases used in many languages around the world, as a relic of the great importance of Neo-Latin, which was the formerly dominant international lingua franca down to the 19th century in a great number of fields. Some minor communities also use Latin in their speech.

=== Mottos ===
The official use of Latin in previous eras has survived at a symbolic level in many mottos that are still being used and even coined in Latin to this day. Old mottos like E pluribus unum, found in 1776 on the Seal of the United States, along with Annuit cœptis and Novus ordo seclorum, and adopted by an Act of Congress in 1782, are still in use. Similarly, current pound sterling coins are minted with the abbreviated Latin inscription D·G·REX·F·D (Dei Gratia Rex Fidei Defensor, i.e., By the Grace of God, King, Defender of the Faith). Monarchs before Elizabeth II used a Latin form of their names on currency, e.g., Carolus, Georgius, and Edwardus for Charles, George, and Edward respectively. The official motto of the multilingual European Union, adopted as recently as 2000, is the Latin In varietate concordia. Similarly, in officially bilingual Canada the motto on the Canadian Victoria Cross is Pro Valore.

=== Fixed phrases ===
Some common phrases that are still in use in many languages have remained fixed in Latin, like the well-known dramatis personae, habeas corpus or casus belli.

=== In science ===
Example of a Russian medical prescription, written in Latin with a Russian signature

In fields as varied as mathematics, physics, astronomy, medicine, pharmacy, biology, and philosophy, Latin still provides internationally accepted names of concepts, forces, objects, and organisms in the natural world.

The most prominent retention of Latin occurs in the classification of living organisms and the binomial nomenclature devised by Carl Linnaeus, although the rules of nomenclature used today allow the construction of names which may deviate considerably from historical norms. Botanical descriptions were mandated to be written entirely in Botanical Latin from 1935 to 2012 and are still allowed to be written so.

Another continuation is the use of Latin names for the constellations and celestial objects (used in the Bayer designations of stars), as well as planets and satellites, whose surface features have been given Latin selenographic toponyms since the 17th century.

Symbols for many of those chemical elements known in ancient times reflect and echo their Latin names, like Au for aurum (gold) and Fe for ferrum (iron).

Latin abbreviations are widely used in medical prescriptions. In some countries, medical prescriptions are still written entirely in Latin, except for the signature (inscription directed towards the patient).

=== Vernacular vocabulary ===
Latin has also contributed a vocabulary for specialised fields such as anatomy and law which has become part of the normal, non-technical vocabulary of various European languages. Latin continues to be used to form international scientific vocabulary and classical compounds. Separately, more than 56% of the vocabulary used in English today derives ultimately from Latin, either directly (28.24%) or through French (28.30%).

== Latin uses and composition from 1900 to the present day ==
=== Ecclesiastical Latin ===
The Catholic Church has continued to use Latin. Two main areas can be distinguished. One is its use for the official version of all documents issued by the Holy See, which has remained intact to the present. Although documents are first drafted in various vernaculars (mostly Italian), the official version is written in Latin by the Latin Letters Office. The other is its use for the liturgy, which has diminished after the Second Vatican Council of 1962–1965, but to some degree resurged half a century later when Pope Benedict XVI encouraged the Latin Mass.

The Church of England permits some services to be conducted in Latin at the Universities of Oxford and Cambridge. Most recently a Latin edition of the 1979 USA Anglican Book of Common Prayer has been produced.

=== Latin in Central Europe ===
In parts of Central Europe, composition of serious Latin poetry continued, such as those by Antonius Smerdel and Jan Novák. In Smerdel's case, his free verse written in Latin has modernist as well as classical and Christian elements. His choice of Latin as a medium reflects both the relative local relevance of Latin, which had a strong poetic tradition into the late nineteenth century, and a means to evade the attention of political censors.

=== Latin in classical music ===
Some Latin texts were written for specific musical cases, for instance classical music pieces, such as Stravinsky's 1927 opera Oedipus Rex.

=== Academic Latin ===
Latin has also survived to some extent in the context of classical scholarship. Some classical periodicals, like the German Hermes, to this day accept articles in Latin for publication; Mnemosyne did so at least until 2017. Latin is used in most of the introductions to the critical editions of ancient authors in the Oxford Classical Texts series, and it is also nearly always used for the apparatus criticus of Ancient Greek and Latin texts.

The scientific journal Theoretica Chemica Acta accepted articles written in Latin until 1998.

The University Orator at the University of Cambridge makes a speech in Latin marking the achievements of each of the honorands at the annual Honorary Degree Congregations, as does the Public Orator at the Encaenia ceremony at the University of Oxford. Harvard and Princeton also have Latin Salutatory commencement addresses every year. The Charles University in Prague and many other universities around the world conduct the awarding of their doctoral degrees in Latin. Other universities and other schools issue diplomas written in Latin. Brown, Sewanee, and Bard College also hold a portion of their graduation ceremonies in Latin. The song Gaudeamus igitur is sung at university opening or graduation ceremonies throughout Europe.

== Living Latin ==
De Viro Optimo; a short clip from a Latin podcast

Living Latin (Latinitas viva in Latin itself), also known as Spoken Latin or Active Latin, is an effort to revive Latin as a spoken language and as a vehicle for contemporary communication and publication. Involvement in this Latin revival can be for purely recreational purposes or pedagogical purposes, or can extend to more serious projects for restoring its former role as an international auxiliary language.

=== Origins ===
After the decline of Latin at the end of the Neo-Latin era started to be perceived, there were attempts to counteract the decline and to revitalize the use of Latin for international communication.

In 1815, Miguel Olmo wrote a booklet proposing Latin as the common language for Europe, with the title Otia Villaudricensia ad octo magnos principes qui Vindobonæ anno MDCCCXV pacem orbis sanxerunt, de lingua Latina et civitate Latina fundanda liber singularis ("Leisure of Villaudric to the eight great princes who ordained world peace at Vienna in 1815, an extraordinary book about the Latin language and founding a Latin state").

In the late 19th century, Latin periodicals advocating the revived use of Latin as an international language started to appear. Between 1889 and 1895, Karl Heinrich Ulrichs published in Italy his Alaudæ. This publication was followed by the Vox Urbis: de litteris et bonis artibus commentarius, published by the architect and engineer Aristide Leonori from 1898, twice a month, until 1913, one year before the outbreak of World War I. In 1889 and 1890, Eduard Johnson (using pseudonyms) published small German phrasebooks for learning conversational Attic Greek and conversational Latin. These books were republished and translated into several modern languages.

The early 20th century, marked by tremendous technological progress, as well as drastic social changes, saw few advances in the use of Latin outside academia. Following the beginnings of the re-integration of postwar Europe, however, Latin revivalism gained some ground.

One of its main promoters was the former dean of the University of Nancy (France), Prof. Jean Capelle, who in 1952 published a cornerstone article called "Latin or Babel" in which he proposed Latin as an international spoken language.

Capelle was called "the soul of the movement" when in 1956 the first International Conference for Living Latin (Congrès international pour le Latin vivant) took place in Avignon, marking the beginning of a new era of the active use of Latin. About 200 participants from 22 different countries took part in that foundational conference.

=== Pronunciation ===
The essentials of the classical pronunciation had been defined since the early 19th century (e.g. in K. L. Schneider's Elementarlehre der Lateinischen Sprache, 1819) but, in many countries, there was strong resistance to adopting it in instruction. In English-speaking countries, where the traditional academic pronunciation diverged most markedly from the restored classical model, the struggle between the two pronunciations lasted the entire 19th century. In 1907, the "new pronunciation" was officially recommended by the Board of Education for adoption in schools in England.

Although the older pronunciation, as found in the nomenclature and terminology of various professions, continued to be used for several decades, and in some spheres prevails to the present day, contemporary Latin as used by the living Latin community has generally adopted the classical pronunciation of Latin as restored by specialists in Latin historical phonology.

=== Aims ===
Many users of Contemporary Latin promote its use as a spoken language, a movement that dubs itself "Living Latin". Two main aims can be distinguished in this movement:

==== For Latin instruction ====
Among the proponents of spoken Latin, some promote the active use of the language to make learning Latin both more enjoyable and more efficient, drawing upon the methodologies of instructors of modern languages.

In the United Kingdom, the Association for the Reform of Latin Teaching (ARLT, still in existence as the Association for Latin Teaching) was founded in 1913 by the classical scholar W. H. D. Rouse. It arose from summer schools which Rouse organised to train Latin teachers in the direct method of language teaching, which entailed using the language in everyday situations rather than merely learning grammar and syntax by rote. The Classical Association also encourages this approach. The Cambridge University Press has now published a series of school textbooks based on the adventures of a mouse called Minimus, designed to help children of primary school age to learn the language, as well as its well-known Cambridge Latin Course (CLC) to teach the language to secondary school students, all of which include extensive use of dialogue and an approach to language teaching mirroring that now used for most modern languages, which have brought many of the principles espoused by Rouse and the ARLT into the mainstream of Latin teaching.

Outside Great Britain, one of the most accomplished handbooks that fully adopts the direct method for Latin is the well-known Lingua Latina per se illustrata by the Danish linguist Hans Henning Ørberg. It was first published in 1955 and improved in 1990. It is composed fully in Latin and requires no other language of instruction, thus it can be used to teach students of many different languages.

==== For contemporary communication ====
Others support the revival of Latin as a language of international communication in academic, scientific, or diplomatic spheres (as it was in Europe and European colonies through the Middle Ages until the mid-18th century) or as an international auxiliary language to be used by anyone. However, as a language native to no people, this movement has not received support from any government, national or supranational.

=== Supporting institutions and publications ===
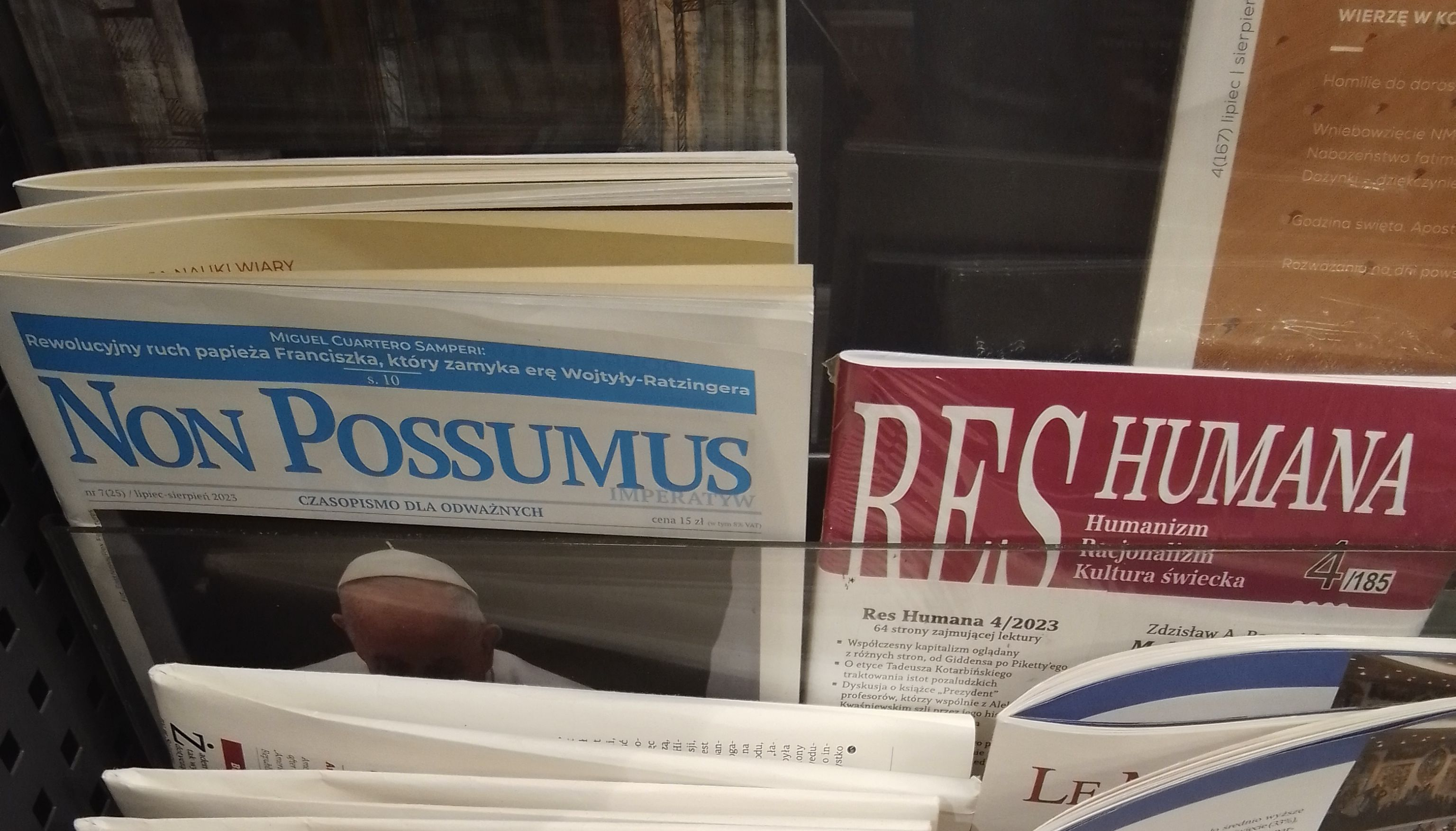
Latin-titled publications in a store in Warsaw, Poland

A substantial group of institutions (particularly in Europe, but also in North and South America) has emerged to support the use of Latin as a spoken language.

The foundational first International Conference for living Latin (Congrès international pour le Latin vivant) that took place in Avignon was followed by at least five others. As a result of those first conferences, the Academia Latinitati Fovendae (ALF) was then created in Rome. Among its most prominent members are well-known classicists from all over the world, like Prof. Michael von Albrecht or Prof. Kurt Smolak. The ALF held its first international conference in Rome in 1966 bringing together about 500 participants. From then on conferences have taken place every four or five years, in Bucharest, Malta, Dakar, Erfurt, Berlin, Madrid, and many other places. The official language of the ALF is Latin and all acts and proceedings take place in Latin.

Also in the year 1966, Clément Desessard published a method with tapes within the series sans peine of the French company Assimil. Desessard's work aimed at teaching contemporary Latin for use in an everyday context, although the audio was often criticized for being recorded with a thick French accent. Assimil took this out of print at the end of 2007 and published another Latin method which focused on the classical idiom only. However, in 2015 Assimil re-published Desessard's edition with new audio CDs in restored classical Latin pronunciation. Desessard's method is still used for living Latin instruction at the Schola Latina Universalis.

In 1986 the Belgian radiologist Gaius Licoppe, who had discovered the contemporary use of Latin and learnt how to speak it thanks to Desessard's method, founded in Brussels the Fundatio Melissa for the promotion of Latin teaching and use for communication.

In Germany, Marius Alexa and Inga Pessarra-Grimm founded in September 1987 the Latinitati Vivæ Provehendæ Associatio (LVPA, or Association for the Promotion of Living Latin).

The first Septimana Latina Amoeneburgensis (Amöneburg Latin Week) was organized in 1989 at Amöneburg, near Marburg in Germany, by Mechtild Hofmann and Robertus Maier. Since then the Latin Weeks were offered every year. In addition, members of the supporting association Septimanae Latinae Europaeae (European Latin Weeks) published a text book named Piper Salve that contains dialogues in modern everyday Latin.

At the Accademia Vivarium Novum located in Rome, Italy, all classes are taught by faculty fluent in Latin or Ancient Greek, and resident students speak in Latin or Greek at all times outside class. Most students are supported by scholarships from the Mnemosyne foundation and spend one or two years in residence to acquire fluency in Latin. The living Latin movement eventually crossed the Atlantic, where it continues to grow. In the summer of 1996, at the University of Kentucky, Prof. Terence Tunberg established the first Conventiculum, an immersion conference in which participants from all over the world meet annually to exercise the active use of Latin to discuss books and literature, and topics related to everyday life. The success of the Conventiculum Lexintoniense has inspired similar conferences throughout the United States.

In October 1996, the Septentrionale Americanum Latinitatis Vivæ Institutum (SALVI, or North American Institute for Living Latin Studies) was founded in Los Angeles, by a group of professors and students of Latin literature concerned about the long-term future of classical studies in the US.

In the University of Kentucky, Prof. Terence Tunberg founded the Institutum Studiis Latinis Provehendis (known in English as the Institute of Latin Studies), which awards Graduate Certificates in Latin Studies addressed at those with a special interest gaining "a thorough command of the Latin language in reading, writing and speaking, along with a wide exposure to the cultural riches of the Latin tradition in its totality". This is the only degree-conferring program in the world with courses taught entirely in Latin.

There is also a proliferation of Latin-speaking institutions, groups and conferences in the Iberian Peninsula and in Latin America. Some prominent examples of this tendency towards the active use of Latin within Spanish and Portuguese-speaking countries are the annual conferences called Jornadas de Culturaclasica.com, held in different cities of southern Spain, as well as the CAELVM (Cursus Aestivus Latinitatis Vivae Matritensis), a Latin summer program in Madrid. In 2012, the Studium Angelopolitanum was founded in Puebla, Mexico, by Prof. Alexis Hellmer, in order to promote the study of Latin in that country, where only one university grants a degree in Classics.

Most of these groups and institutions organise seminars and conferences where Latin is used as a spoken language, both throughout the year and over the summer, in Europe and in America.

Less academic summer encounters wholly carried out in Latin are the ones known as Septimanæ Latinæ Europææ (European Latin Weeks), celebrated in Germany and attracting people of various ages from all over Europe.

At the present time, several periodicals and social networking web sites are published in Latin. In France, immediately after the conference at Avignon, the publisher Théodore Aubanel launched the magazine Vita Latina, which still exists, associated to the CERCAM (Centre d'Étude et de Recherche sur les Civilisations Antiques de la Méditerranée) of the Paul Valéry University, Montpellier III. Until very recently, it was published in Latin in its entirety. In Germany, the magazine Vox Latina was founded in 1965 by Caelestis Eichenseer (1924–2008) and is to this day published wholly in Latin four times a year in the University of Saarbrücken. In Belgium, the magazine Melissa created in 1984 by Gaius Licoppe is still published six times a year completely in Latin.

Hebdomada aenigmatum is a free online magazine of crosswords, quizzes, and other games in Latin language. It is published by the Italian cultural Association Leonardo in collaboration with the online Latin news magazine Ephemeris and with ELI publishing house.

From 1989 until 2019, Finnish radio station YLE Radio 1 broadcast a weekly review of world news called Nuntii Latini completely in Latin. The German Radio Bremen also had regular broadcasts in Latin until December 2017. Other attempts have been less successful. Beginning from July 2015 Radio F.R.E.I. from Erfurt (Germany) broadcasts in Latin once a week on Wednesdays for 15 minutes; the broadcast is called Erfordia Latina.

In 2015, the Italian startup pptArt launched its catalogue (Catalogus) and its registration form for artists (Specimen ad nomina signanda) in Latin and English.

In 2016, ACEM (Enel executives' cultural association) organized with Luca Desiata and Daniel Gallagher the first Business Latin course for managers (Congressus studiorum – Lingua Latina mercatoria).

The government of Finland, during its presidencies of the European Union, issued official newsletters in Latin on top of the official languages of the Union.

=== In public spaces ===
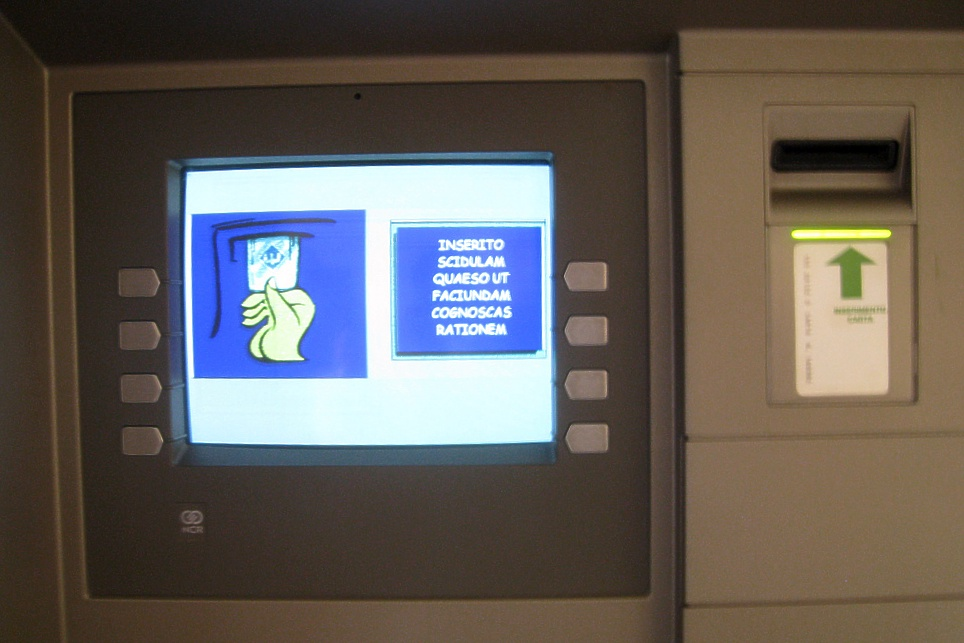
The ATM with Latin instructions

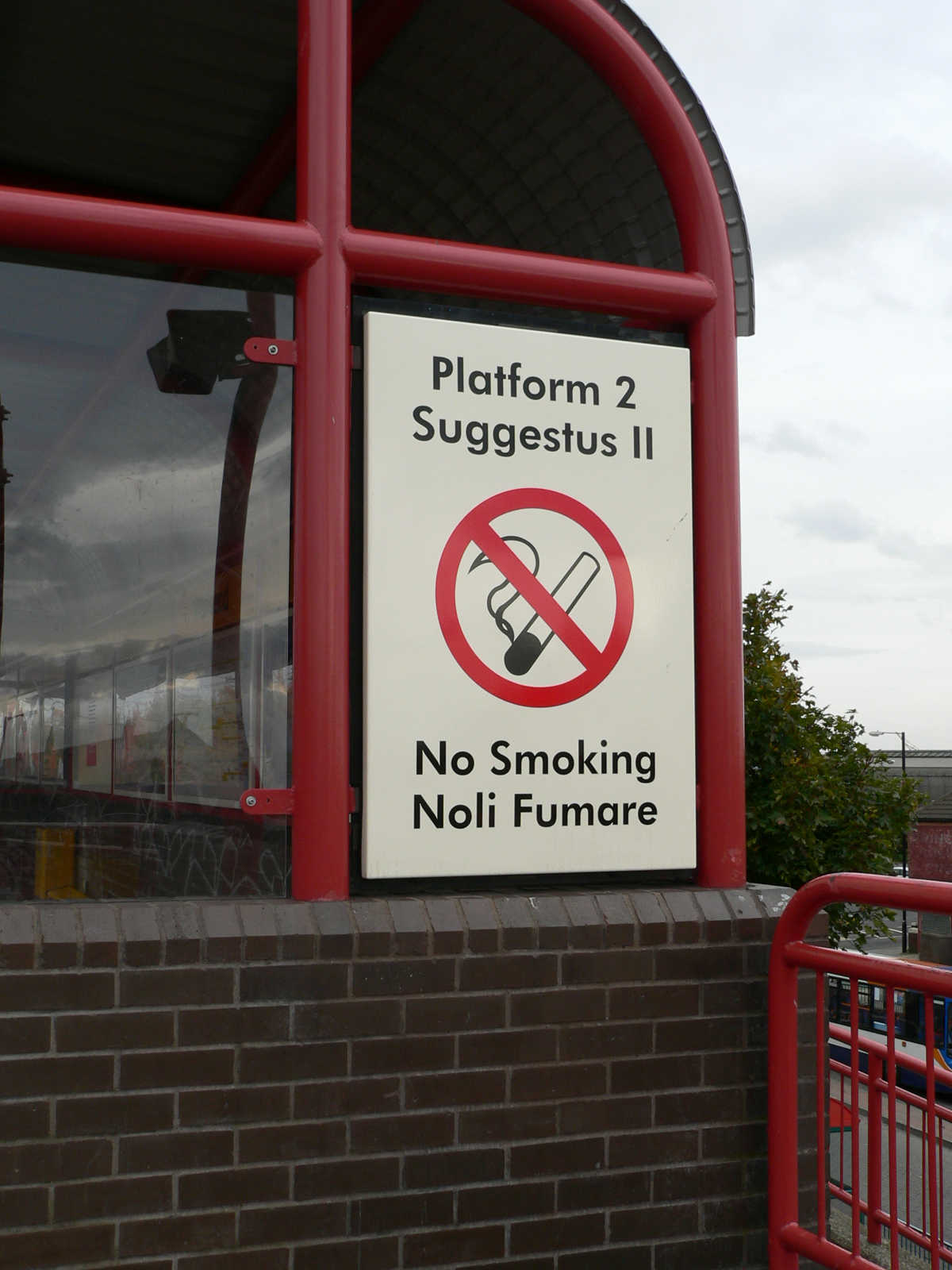
The signs at Wallsend Metro station are in English and Latin as a tribute to Wallsend's role as one of the outposts of the Roman empire.

Although less so than in previous eras, contemporary Latin has also been used for public notices in public spaces:

The Wallsend Metro station of the Tyne and Wear Metro has signs in Latin.

The Vatican City has an automated teller machine with instructions in Latin.

== Original production ==
Some contemporary works have been produced originally in Latin, most overwhelmingly poetry, but also prose, as well as music or cinema. They include:

=== Poetry ===
- 1924. Carminum libri quattuor by Tomás Viñas.
- 1946. Carmina Latina by A. Pinto de Carvalho.
- 1954. Vox Humana by Johannes Alexander Gaertner.
- 1962. Pegasus Tolutarius by Henry C. Snurr, pen name Arrius Nurus.
- 1966. Suaviloquia by Jan Novák.
- 1966. Cantus Firmus by Johannes Alexander Gaertner.
- 1972. Carmina by Traian Lăzărescu.
- 1991. Periegesis Amatoria by Geneviève Immè.
- 1992. Harmonica vitrea by Anna Elissa Radke.
- 2021. Sermones by Michael von Albrecht

=== Prose ===
- 1948. Graecarum Litterarum Historia by Antonio d'Elia.
- 1952. Latinarum Litterarum Historia by Antonio d'Elia.
- 1961. De sacerdotibus sacerdotiisque Alexandri Magni et Lagidarum eponymis by Jozef IJsewijn.
- 1965. Sententiæ by Alain van Dievoet (pen name: Alaenus Divutius).
- 1966. Mystagogus Lycius, sive de historia linguaque Lyciorum by Wolfgang Jenniges.
- 2011. Capti: Fabula Menippeo-Hoffmanniana Americana (Heptalogia Sphingis) by Stephen A. Berard.
- 2019: Praecursus: Fabula Neophysiologica (Heptalogia Sphingis) by Stephen A. Berard.
- 2019. Hebdomada Aenigmatum by Luca Desiata

=== Music ===
- 1927. Oedipus Rex by Igor Stravinsky (an opera-oratorio with libretto, based on Sophocles's tragedy, prepared in French by Jean Cocteau and given its final Latin form by Abbé Jean Daniélou).
- 1994. Ista?!?! by Latin hip hop band Ista.
- 1995. The works of Elvis Presley have been translated into Latin by Finnish academic Jukka Ammondt.
- 2008. Super Smash Bros. Brawl main theme.
- 2011. Audio, Video, Disco by French electronic group Justice.
- 2020. Legend of Zelda, music of Koji Kondo arranged into a symphony by Canadian musician Alexandre Choinière, and texts translated and adapted into Latin by Olivier Simon.

=== Cinema ===
- 1966. A Man for All Seasons by Fred Zinnemann (includes a famous comic scene where Thomas More's daughter Margaret speaks better Latin than King Henry VIII)
- 1976. Sebastiane by Derek Jarman and Paul Humfress.
- 2004. The Passion of the Christ by Mel Gibson.
- 2009. Pacifica by Samohi Latin Media (SLAM).
- 2010. Barnabus & Bella by SLAM.
- 2013. Imperator, Emperor by Konrad Łęcki.

=== Television ===
- 1990. Mr. Bean, title sequences.
- 2008. O Tempora! by the Kulturzeit team (37:44min special broadcast, 22 August 2008) of the German public channel 3sat.
- 2020–present. Barbarians A Netflix TV series using German and Latin dialogue; mostly in German but extensive Latin scenes.

=== Blogs ===
- 2019–present. O tempora, o mores is a daily blog in Latin on Linkiesta, where Francesco Lepore, a journalist and a former papal Latinist at the Vatican (2003–2005), comments daily news on politics, crime, health, customs and civil rights.

== Translations ==
Various texts—usually children's books—have been translated into Latin since the beginning of the living Latin movement in the early fifties for various purposes, including use as a teaching tool or simply to demonstrate the capability of Latin as a means of expression in a popular context. They include:

- 1884. Rebilius Cruso (Robinson Crusoe) tr. Francis William Newman.
- 1922. Insula Thesavraria (Treasure Island) tr. Arcadius Avellanus.
- 1928. Vita discriminaque Robinsonis Crusoei (Robinson Crusoe) tr. Arcadius Avellanus.
- 1960. Winnie Ille Pu (Winnie-the-Pooh) tr. Alexander Lenard.
- 1962. Ferdinandus Taurus (Ferdinand the Bull) tr. Elizabeth Chamberlayne Hadas.
- 1962. Fabula De Petro Cuniculo (The Tale of Peter Rabbit) tr. E. Perot Walker.
- 1964. Alicia in Terra Mirabili (Alice's Adventures in Wonderland) tr. Clive Harcourt Carruthers.
- 1965. Fabula de Jemima Anate-Aquatica (The Tale of Jemima Puddle-Duck) tr. Jonathan Musgrave.
- 1966. Aliciae per Speculum Transitus (Quaeque ibi Invenit) (Through the Looking-Glass, and What Alice Found There) tr. Clive Harcourt Carruthers.
- 1973–present. Asterix (Asterix)
- 1978. Fabula de Domino Ieremia Piscatore (The Tale of Mr. Jeremy Fisher) tr. E. Perot Walker.
- 1983. Alix – Spartaci Filius (The Adventures of Alix)
- 1985. Regulus, vel Pueri Soli Sapiunt (The Little Prince) tr. Augusto Haury
- 1987. De Titini et Miluli Facinoribus: De Insula Nigra (Tintin comic The Black Island)
- 1987. The Classical Wizard / Magus Mirabilis in Oz (The Wonderful Wizard of Oz) tr. C.J. Hinke and George Van Buren.
- 1990. De Titini et Miluli Facinoribus: De Sigaris Pharaonis (Tintin comic Cigars of the Pharaoh)
- 1991. Tela Charlottae (Charlotte's Web) tr. Bernice Fox.
- 1994. Sub rota (Beneath the Wheel) tr. Sigrides C. Albert
- 1998. Quomodo Invidiosulus Nomine Grinchus Christi Natalem Abrogaverit (How the Grinch Stole Christmas!) tr. Jennifer Morrish Tunberg, Terence Tunberg.
- 1998. Winnie Ille Pu Semper Ludet (The House at Pooh Corner) tr. Brian Staples.
- 2000. Cattus Petasatus (The Cat in the Hat) tr. Jennifer Morish Tunberg, Terence Tunberg.
- 2002. Arbor Alma (The Giving Tree) tr. Terence Tunberg, Jennifer Morrish Tunberg.
- 2003. Virent Ova, Viret Perna (Green Eggs and Ham) tr. Terence Tunberg, Jennifer Morrish Tunberg.
- 2003. Harrius Potter et Philosophi Lapis (Harry Potter and the Philosopher's Stone) tr. Peter Needham.
- 2005. Tres Mures Caeci ("Three Blind Mice") tr. David C. Noe.
- 2006. Harrius Potter et Camera Secretorum (Harry Potter and the Chamber of Secrets) tr. Peter Needham.
- 2007. Olivia: the essential Latin edition tr. Amy High.
- 2009. Over 265 illustrated children's books in Latin have been published on the Tar Heel Reader website.
- 2009. Murena, Murex et aurum (Murena, La pourpre et l'or) tr. Claude Aziza and Cathy Rousset.
- 2012. Hobbitus Ille (The Hobbit) tr. Mark Walker.
- 2022. Insolitus Casus Doctoris Jekyll et Medici Hyde (Dr Jekyll and Mr Hyde) tr. Garrett Dome.

== Dictionaries, glossaries, and phrase books for contemporary Latin ==
- 1990. Latin for All Occasions, a book by Henry Beard, attempts to find Latin equivalents for contemporary catchphrases.
- 1992–97. Neues Latein Lexicon / Lexicon recentis Latinitatis by Karl Egger, containing more than 15,000 words for contemporary everyday life.
- 1998. Imaginum vocabularium Latinum by Sigrid Albert.
- 1999. Piper Salve by Robert Maier, Mechtild Hofmann, Klaus Sallmann, Sabine Mahr, Sascha Trageser, Dominika Rauscher, Thomas Gölzhäuser.
- 2010. Visuelles Wörterbuch Latein-Deutsch by Dorling Kindersley, translated by Robert Maier.
- 2012. Septimana Latina vol. 1+2 edited by Mechtild Hofmann and Robert Maier (based on Piper Salve).

== See also ==
- Reginald Foster (Latinist)
- Botanical Latin
- Latin translations of modern literature
- Latino sine Flexione
- Law Latin
- Interlingua
- List of songs with Latin lyrics
- List of Active-Language Classicists
