= John Traupman =

American professor, author, and advocate of spoken Latin

John Charles Traupman
- Born: John Charles Traupman; 2 January 1923; Nazareth, PA, U.S.
- Died: 18 February 2019 (aged 96); Penn Valley, PA, U.S.
- Education: Moravian College (BA); Princeton University (MA, PhD)
- Occupations: Latinist, Classicist, educator
- Known for: prolific author of Latin and German language books
- Spouse: Pauline Traupman
- Children: Diane Phillips

Academic work
- Discipline: Classical philology
- Institutions: St. Joseph's University, Villanova University
- Notable works: Conversational Latin for Oral Proficiency (Active Latin phrasebook); The New College Latin and English Dictionary
- Military career
- Allegiance: United States
- Branch: United States Army
- Rank: Sergeant Major

John Charles Traupman (January 2, 1923 – February 18, 2019) was a prolific American author of Latin and German language books and a long-serving professor of Classics at Saint Joseph's University in Philadelphia, PA.

== Early life and education ==
Traupman was born in Nazareth, PA. He attended Geneva Seminary in Ohio, but later enlisted in the US Army. Traupman was already fluent in German, but he was sent to Japan where he also became fluent in Japanese. He eventually achieved the rank of Sgt. Major.

After the war he earned a degree in Latin and the Classics from Moravian College. Traupman received his PhD from Princeton University in 1964.

== Career ==
He joined faculty of St. Joseph's College (now University), and worked 38 years there as a professor of Latin. For the last 30 years of his career he also served as chair of the Classics Department. Traupman served as president of the Philadelphia Classical Society for 8 years and was instrumental in its growth.

== Legacy ==
"John [Traupman] received numerous awards and was known world wide for his publications that are still being used in universities to this day."

Milena Minkova and Terence Tunberg write: "John Traupman is especially well-known as the author of Conversational Latin and The New College Latin and English Dictionary."

In his review of Conversational Latin (4th ed.), Akihiko Watanabe wrote:

Traupman's Conversational Latin for Oral Proficiency has been a popular introductory reference and exercise text in U.S. Latin-speaking circles since its publication... Traupman and his assistants must be thanked for their fantastic contribution in facilitating one's entry to the community of Latin users.

== Opera ==
- Traupman, John Charles (1964). The Life and Reign of Commodus (PhD thesis). Princeton University.
- Traupman, John C. (1966). The New College Latin & English Dictionary. Bantam Books. ISBN 978-0-553-20255-7.
- Traupman, John C. (1984). The Bantam New College German & English Dictionary. Bantam Books. ISBN 9780553259537.
- Traupman, John C. (1989). Latin is Fun, Book I. Amsco School Publications. ISBN 978-0-87720-550-0.
- Traupman, John C. (1992). German Fundamentals: Basic Grammar and Vocabulary (Instructional card). Barron's. ISBN 9780812063066.
- Traupman, John C. (1994). The New College Latin & English Dictionary (2nd ed.). Amsco School Publications. ISBN 978-0-87720-561-6.
- Traupman, John C. (1995). Latin is Fun, Book II. Amsco School Publications. ISBN 978-0-87720-565-4.
- Traupman, John C. (1996). Conversational Latin for Oral Proficiency (1st ed.). Bolchazy-Carducci Publishers. ISBN 978-0-86516-316-4.
- Traupman, John C. (1997). The New International Webster's German & English Dictionary. Trident Reference Publishing. ISBN 978-1-88877-745-1.
- Traupman, John C. (1999). Lingua Latina: Book I. Amsco School Publications. ISBN 978-1-56765-425-7.
- Traupman, John (2001). Vergil's Search for Meaning: The Tragic Vision of the Georgics. Wimbledon Publishing Company. ISBN 9781898855798.
- Suetonius; Donatus (2001). Schaeffer, Peter; Traupman, John (eds.). Annotated Edition of the Life of Vergil by Suetonius and Donatus. Classics Series. Wimbledon Publishing Company. ISBN 978-1-898855-75-0.
- Traupman, John C. (2002). Lingua Latina: Book II. Amsco School Publications. ISBN 978-1-56765-429-5.
- Traupman, John (2002). A Practical Manual for Teaching Latin. Wimbledon Publishing Company. ISBN 9781898855767.
- Traupman, John (2003). Breviarium Ab Urbe Condita Eutropi. Wimbledon Publishing Company. ISBN 9781898855804.
- Traupman, John C. (2007). Conversational Latin for Oral Proficiency (4th ed.). Bolchazy-Carducci Publishers. ISBN 978-0-86516-622-6.
- Traupman, John C. (2007). The Bantam New College Latin & English Dictionary, Revised and Updated (revised ed.). Bantam Books. ISBN 978-0-553-59012-8.
