= Jean Capelle =

Jean Capelle may refer to:

- Jean Capelle (footballer) (1913–1977), Belgian footballer
- Jean Capelle (athlete) (died 1962), French athlete in the marathon
- Jean Capelle (politician) (1909–1983), French politician
