= Dimitris Z. Nikitas =

Dimitris Z. Nikitas (born 1949) is a Greek academician, specializing in Latin language and literature.

== Biography ==
He was born in Thessaloniki. He studied classical philology in the school of Philosophy in the Aristotle University of Thessaloniki from 1967 to 1971 and German language from 1974 to 1977. In 1974 he was appointed initially as an assistant professor in the faculty of Classical Philology, and he was promoted later to professor.

From 1977 to 1981 he completed his postgraduate studies in Mannheim and Heidelberg universities in West Germany. He compiled his thesis in Germany and continued post-doctoral studies in Germany, France and Italy as a fellow of the Alexander von Humboldt Foundation.

He was director of Classical Studies sector, director of Postgraduate studies programme and president of the faculty of Philology within the university. He was also a member of the Research Commission and the Senate of University of Thessaloniki. He has been an invited professor in universities in Greece and abroad. He has been teaching Latin patrology in Kinshasa, DR Congo since 2014 and he is a member of scientific societies in Greece and abroad. He has written texts in scientific journals and publications, as well texts in simplified language for publication in magazines and newspapers.

He is also known for his introduction in Latin language and literature, which is taught in the third grade of high school in Greece, as a part of the curriculum for the state exams. In Greece, Latin is taught only in the first orientation group, which includes Ancient Greek and History as well, intended for students wishing to study law, psychology or history, among others. This introduction, with the inclusion of many historical events and terms, as well as less-known writers, became part of the curriculum in 2021. Exactly due to this feature, many teachers and students have requested the reversion of this decision.

== Books written by him ==
He translated History of Roman Literature of Michael von Albrecht in two volumes. He also wrote the book Greek Letters and Latin Middle Ages of Walter Berschien, and a two-volume Latin-Greek dictionary with Leonidas Tromaras among others.
