= Gianluca Comin =

Italian businessman

Gianluca Comin (born 2 April 1963 in Udine) is the founder of Comin & Partners, a Communication and Public Relations company. The company is focused in government affairs, communication, media relations and crisis communication. Since January 2016 he is also a Board member of Biennale di Venezia.

== Career ==
Gianluca Comin started his professional career in 1986 as a journalist at the Rome office of the daily paper Il Gazzettino. Until 1997, he reported about politics from Rome and in 1998 he became Head of the Press Office of the Ministry of Public Works and spokesman for the Minister.

In 1999 Comin was appointed Director of External Relations and bureau chief at the Montedison S.p.A. Rome office, where he was in charge of communication for the IPO of Compart Montedison, of Compart Burgo, of Falck-Sondel at Compart-Montedison, of Fiat-Edf at Compart Montedison. At that time he was also managing and coordinating relations with Italian and EU institutional authorities.

In September 2001 he was named Head of Communication and Media Relations at Telecom Italia. His most significant activities included managing relations with the national and international media for the various companies of the Telecom Italia Group and coordinating of the corporate-financial press offices, Domestic Wireline, Tim, Seat Group, It Telecom, and Telespazio press offices.

In 2002 he moved to Enel as Director of Communications in charge of advertising, media relations, events, internal communications, corporate identity, relations with the associations and corporate social responsibility. Until June 2014, he was Director of External Relations of Enel Group. and Board member of Endesa sa., a Spanish electricity Company that is part of Enel Group.

Comin is a visiting professor at LUISS University (Communication strategy and advertising) and lecturer at several universities and institutions including Bocconi University and CSM (Consiglio Superiore della Magistratura – Superior Council of Magistracy).

He was a member of the National Council of Confindustria and managing director of Enel Foundation and Enel Cuore. He served as President of FERPI (the Italian Association of Public Relations), and later became a member of the Executive Board. He was editor in chief of Oxygen and author of "2030 La tempesta perfetta", 2012, Rizzoli. In 2019 he edited Integrated Communication and Reputation Management (Luiss University Press, 2019), with the participation of other professionals and communication experts. The volume aimed to respond to changes in society, consumers and businesses through new strategies and integrated communication tools.

He was a member of the Ministry of Cultural Heritage Communication Committee and of the Ministry of Economy and Finance, in charge of selecting tender winners for integrated communication projects for Southern Italy. He served as board member of Syremont Spa (Montedison Group Company). He was a Member of the Committee to inform on the 2000 Jubilee. He participated in the Presidency of the Council of Ministers and CCISS advisory Committee (Information on traffic Coordination Centre). In 2016 and 2017 he was a member of the Scientific Committee of the Corporate Art Awards organized by pptArt.

== Publications ==
Gianluca Comin is the author of the following publications:

- Comunicazione integrata e reputation management, a cura di Gianluca Comin (Luiss University Press, 2019);
- L'impresa oltre la crisi. Per una gestione efficace della reputazione aziendale, (Marsilio, 2016);
- 2030 La Tempesta Perfetta - Come sopravvivere alla grande crisi, with Donato Speroni:(Rizzoli, 2012) http://2030latempestaperfetta.it/
- Il modello di comunicazione integrata Enel (on “La comunicazione d’azienda”, Collesei -Ravà- Isedi, 2009);
- I nuovi strumenti per la gestione del consenso (on “Co-opetition”, Simonetta Pattuglia e Sergio Cherubini, Franco Angeli, 2009);
- La Comunicazione alla prova del web (on “Comunicare, un successo”, Igor Righetti, UTET, 2009);
- Comunicare con gli eventi culturali: L'Estate di Raffaello (on “Comunicare con gli eventi”, Simonetta Pattuglia e Sergio Cherubini, Franco Angeli, 2007)
