= Vita Latina =

Series of conferences in France promoting modern use of Latin

Vita Latina Congrès international pour le latin vivant
- Discipline: Latin as an active spoken and written language

Publication details
- Publisher: Jean Capelle; Édouard Théodore-Aubanel; Pierre Grimal
- History: 1956–1975
- Frequency: Irregular

Vita Latina ("Latin life") refers to a series of five international academic conferences dedicated to the modern use of spoken and written Latin, held in France from 1956 to 1975.

== History ==
Following World War II, European intellectuals and Latin scholars and enthusiasts wanted to unify the continent and revive the use of Latin. In 1952, Professor Jean Capelle, former dean of the University of Nancy, published an influential article titled Le latin ou Babel ("Latin or Babel"), proposing Latin as a modern international spoken language. This article catalyzed a series of five international conferences, each held in France: Congrès international pour le Latin vivant ("International Congress for Living Latin")

Vita Latina Conferences
Year	Title	Location	Organizer	Attendees
1956	Premier Congrès international pour le latin vivant	Avignon, France	Jean Capelle & Édouard Théodore-Aubanel	Approx. 200–250 (from 22 nations)
1959	Deuxième Congrès international pour le latin vivant	Lyon (Villeurbanne), France	Jean Capelle	158 participants from 19 countries
1963	Troisième Congrès international pour le latin vivant	Strasbourg, France	Pierre Grimal	254 to 400 participants from at least 22 countries
1969	Quatrième Congrès international pour le latin vivant	Avignon, France	Pierre Grimal	235 from 19 countries
1975	Cinquième Congrès international pour le latin vivant	Pau, France	Pierre Grimal	89, fewer attendees from outside France

== Influence ==
=== Other groups and conferences ===
The 1963 Vita Latina conference in Avignon formally proposed that the next conference should be held in Rome. A direct response to this was a 1966 conference in Rome organized by Pietro Romanelli. Even though the Rome conference was organized independently, most attendees of the 1963 conference in Avignon also attended the Rome conference in 1966.

The Rome conference eventually led to the foundation of a new association likewise based in Rome, the Academia Latinitati Fovendae (ALF). It can be said that the Living Latin movement split into two separate efforts. As scholar Karolis M. Lyvens describes it, "the [1966] congress marks a meeting point where the official movement of Living Latin branched in two."

=== Association Vita Latina ===
Association Vita Latina
- Formation: 1957
- Founders: Jean Capelle and Édouard Théodore-Aubanel
- Founded at: Avignon, France
- Type: Academic association
- Purpose: Study of Latin
- Headquarters: Montpellier, France
- Region served: International
- Members: Classicists, Neo-Latin scholars

The Vita Latina association was founded in 1957 by Édouard Théodore-Aubanel and Jean Capelle, after the Avignon Vita Latina Congress in September 1956, establishing its original focus on the "Living Latin" movement.

The world-renowned French latinist and historian Pierre Grimal served as President of the association from the 1962 until his resignation in 1989. After that, the association's journal transitioned from being written fully in Latin to a broader classical studies format, with articles in French, English and other languages.

Following this transition, Paul Marius Martin, Emeritus Professor of Latin at UPVM, took over the academic and organizational steering of Association Vita Latina. He served as President until 2009 and remains its Président d'honneur ("Honorary President").

Today, the association's mission is to promote Latin culture and the teaching of Latin the language.

=== Vita Latina Journal ===
Vita Latina [Journal]
- Discipline: Classics, Latin literature, Philology
- Language: English, French, German, Italian, Latin and Spanish
- Edited by: University of Montpellier Paul Valéry (UPVM)

Publication details
- History: Since 1957
- Publisher: CERCAM (Centre d’étude et de recherche sur les civilisations antiques de la Méditerranée) (France)
- Frequency: annual
- Open access: Delayed

Standard abbreviations
- ISO 4: Vita Lat.

Indexing
- ISSN: 0042-7306

Links
- Homepage at OpenEdition Journals; Journal Archive at Persée

The Vita Latina journal was launched in 1957, the same year as the association of the same name.

From 1957 through 1994, the journal was written entirely in Latin. Alongside academic articles, it published original Latin poems, short stories, and Latin essays addressing modern news and current events.

Starting in 1994, the journal moved its headquarters from Avignon to the University of Montpellier Paul Valéry, associating with the CERCAM research center. The journal stopped publishing creative writing and became an annual peer-reviewed academic journal, including articles covering Classical antiquity to the Renaissance. Since 1994, the journal has included articles in many languages besides Latin (French, English, etc.).

== See also ==
- Academia Latinitati Fovendae
- Living Latin
- Pietro Romanelli
- Jean Capelle, more details at Jean Capelle (in French)
- Pierre Grimal
- Édouard Théodore-Aubanel (in French)
