= Studium Angelopolitanum =

- Founded: 2012
- Type: Educational organization
- Purpose: Classics, Classical Studies, Humanities
- Location: Puebla, Mexico
- Region served: Mexico
- Key people: Alexis Hellmer
- Website: studiumangelopolitanum.wordpress.com

Studium Angelopolitanum is a non-profit educational organization, based in Puebla, Mexico and focused on promoting study and appreciation of classical languages and literature. It was founded in 2012 by professor Alexis Hellmer. It is modelled after Luigi Miraglia's Accademia Vivarium Novum in Rome. It is one of the very few places in Mexico to offer Latin lessons taught entirely in Latin.

== See also ==
- Accademia Vivarium Novum
- Contemporary Latin
- Paideia Institute
