= Luca Desiata =

Italian CEO, latinist and art curator

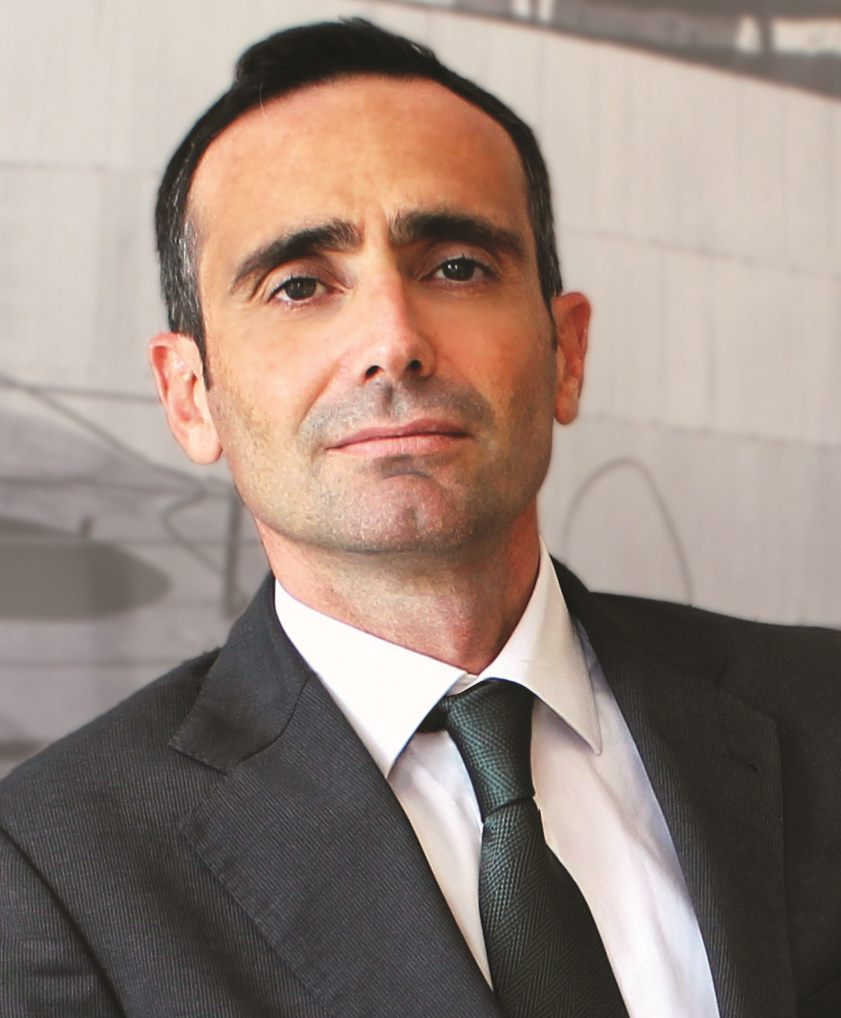
- Born: 10 December 1971 (age 54); Isernia, Italy
- Occupation: CEO of SOGIN (2016-2019)
- Known for: Founder of Hebdomada Aenigmatum, Latin crosswords

Luca Desiata (born December 10, 1971) is an Italian manager, Latinist and art curator. He was the CEO of SOGIN between 2016 and 2019. He is the founder and editor-in-chief of the magazine of Latin crosswords Hebdomada Aenigmatum and of the magazine of crosswords in Ancient Greek Onomata Kechiasmena. He is the curator of the Corporate Art Awards.

== Classical Languages ==
He founded Hebdomada Aenigmatum in June 2014 under the pseudonym of Lucas Cupidus and Onomata Kechiasmena in May 2015 with the name of Λουκᾶς Δεσιάτα.

He organized numerous events for students and professionals, in order to foster the use of Latin and ancient Greek in modern society: the first Certamen Aenigmatum Latinorum (Latin Enigmatic Olympiad) at the X Festival Européen Latin-Grec at the École normale supérieure de Lyon; the seminar "Business Latin - Latin expressions for the modern manager" for the association of Enel executives; several presentations about "Latin in the Internet age", of which two in 2017 at the Scuola Normale Superiore di Pisa.

On December 5, 2016 in Rome, he signed a memorandum of understanding with the Italian Ministry of Education to promote the use of Latin and Greek crosswords as a tool to facilitate learning ancient languages.

== Corporate Art ==
Under the patronage of the Italian Ministry of Culture, in 2016 he organized the first edition of the "Corporate Art Awards", with the aim to recognize the best art projects of the Corporate World.

In the 2017 edition, the scope of the Corporate Art Awards was extended to include the Institutional world, too. Therefore the program was renamed “Mecenati of the XXI century”. The 2017 Awards Ceremony was hosted by the President of the Italian Republic Sergio Mattarella at the Quirinal Palace.

In 2015 Desiata curated the Corporate Art exhibit at the Galleria Nazionale d'Arte Moderna in Rome .

He was a professor of Corporate art at LUISS Business School between 2014 and 2016. In 2014 he founded pptArt, the first art-crowdsourcing platform.

== Management ==
In July 2016 he was nominated Chief Executive Officer of SOGIN, the Italian state owned company responsible for the decommissioning of the Italian nuclear plants. In September 2017, he submitted the Italian nuclear decommissioning program to an independent peer review of the International Atomic Energy Agency.

From 1995 to 2002 he worked for Procter & Gamble, Accenture and Bain. From 2002 to 2006, he joined the World Bank in Belgrade as an advisor to the Privatization Agency of the Republic of Serbia. From 2006 to 2016 he held different roles in Enel. He holds an engineering degree at the University of Pisa, a diploma at the Sant'Anna School of Advanced Studies in Pisa and an MBA at Insead Business School.

He was awarded the Italian national honour of Knight of the Order of the Star of Italian Solidarity in 2006.

Forbes included him in the Italian list of the 2019 winning managers. In May 2018 he ranked 24th in TopManager’s reputation ranking of Italian top managers.

== Other activities ==
He is the author of "Scacchi e strategie aziendali" (Chess and Corporate Strategy) with Anatoly Karpov, 12th chess world champion, and Rocco Sabelli, former Ceo of Alitalia .

== See also ==
- Contemporary Latin
