= Alexis Hellmer =

Mexican Latinist and classicist

Alexis Hellmer is a Mexican Latinist and classicist and the founder of Studium Angelopolitanum. He is a Professor of the Latin language and literature at the Benemérita Universidad Autónoma de Puebla and at the Universidad Popular Autónoma del Estado de Puebla.

Professor Hellmer is an alumnus of Luigi Miraglia's Accademia Vivarium Novum. As a student, he spent one year in Montella learning Latin language and classical humanities. From 2009 to 2012, he taught (ancient) Latin literature at Vivarium Novum.

A proponent of Hans Ørberg's natural method of language learning, he has been ranked among the top Latin speakers in the world. In 2015 and 2016, he served as repetitor (teaching staff) at Rusticatio Virginiana and Conventiculum Bostoniense. In February 2017, Professor Hellmer was a speaker in the Living Latin in New York City conference, organized by the Paideia Institute and Fordham University of New York.

== See also ==
- Recent Latin
