= Latin Letters Office =

Vatican government department

The Latin Letters Office is a department of the Roman Curia's Secretariat of State of the Holy See in Vatican City. It is well known among modern-day Latinists as the place where documents of the Catholic Church are written in or translated into Latin.

== History ==
The Secretariate of Briefs to Princes and of Latin Letters, or in short Secretariate of Briefs, was one of the so-called offices of the Roman Curia which were abolished in the 20th century. The secretary for Latin letters was a prelate or private chamberlain whose duties were to write the letters of less solemnity which the sovereign pontiff addresses to different personages.

By the time of Pope Paul VI's reform of the Roman Curia, the office once known as Secretary for Briefs to Princes had been renamed more prosaically as the Latin Language Department of the First Section of the Secretariat of State. No longer headed by a Cardinal, it had lost some of its luster, but it remained the real communications hub at the Vatican.

== 21st century ==
Reginald Foster was an American Catholic priest and friar of the Order of Discalced Carmelites, born in Milwaukee, Wisconsin, on 14 November 1939. A noted Latin expert, he worked in the Latin Letters Section of the Secretariat of State in the Vatican. Foster became one of the Pope's Latinists in the late 1960s.

Today, the office's seven Latinists have a steady stream of work, and sometimes they fall behind. When Pope Benedict XVI’s encyclical Caritas in veritate was published in July 2009, no Latin text was released, apparently for the first time. The translators were still working on the document, and the Latin version was published only at the end of August – after it had been sent by DHL courier to Foster's sickbed for corrections.
