= Jukka Ammondt =

Finnish literature professor

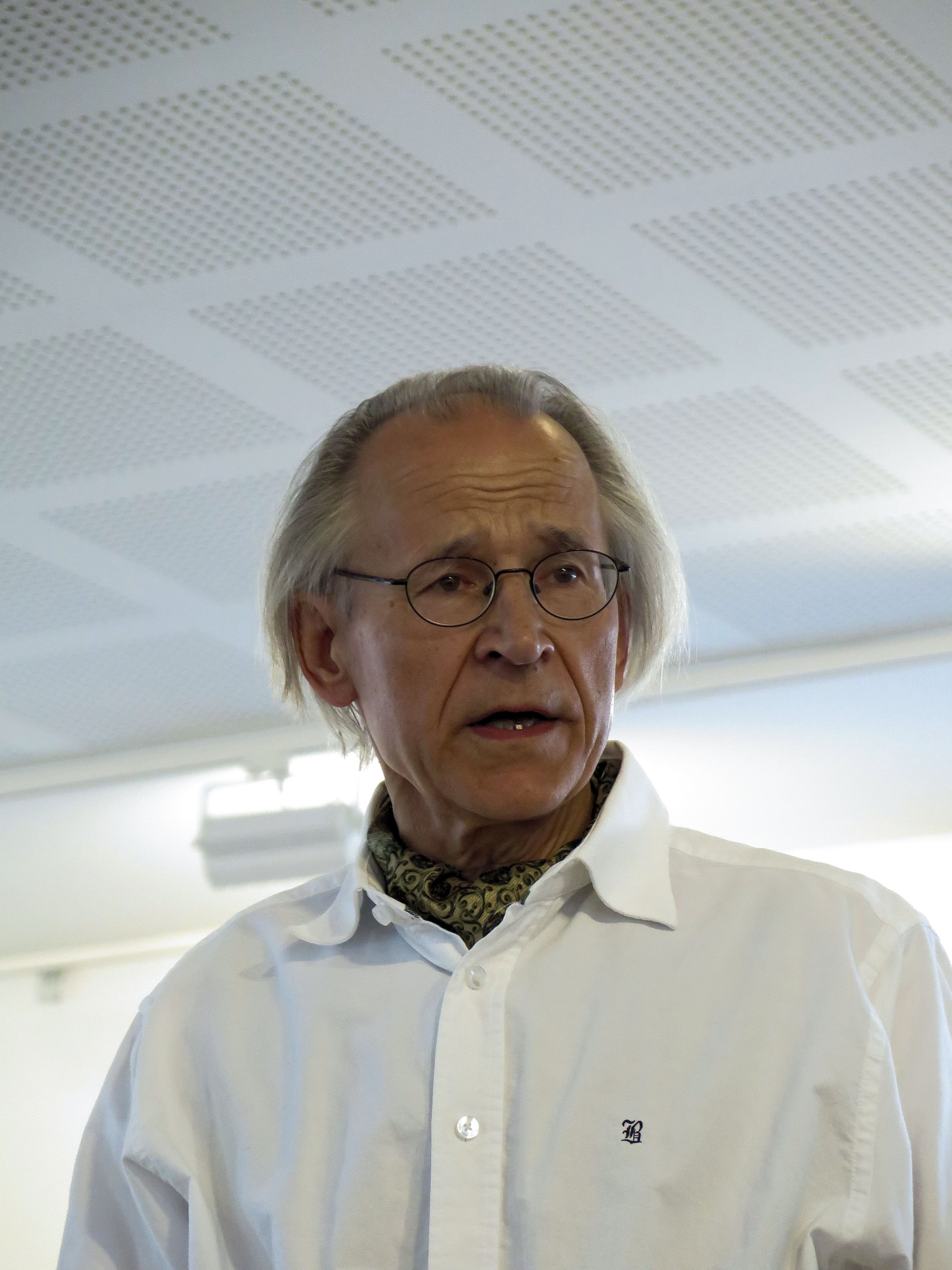
Jukka Ammondt

Jukka Ammondt is a Finnish literature professor who has recorded popular music, including songs of Elvis Presley, in Latin and Sumerian.

Jukka Ammondt is a professor of literature in the University of Jyväskylä, Finland with a Ph.D in philosophy. In 1992 he recorded a single consisting of tango songs sung in Latin. 1993 he recorded the first record Surun Siivet, Latin versions of tangos by songwriter Toivo Kärki, and later the same year another album, Tango Triste Finnicum, for which he gained international recognition.

In 1995 Ammondt recorded an album The Legend Lives Forever in Latin, Latin versions of songs of Elvis Presley. Later in the same year he toured the United States. In 2001 Ammondt recorded a new album, Three Songs in Sumerian, featuring Blue Suede Shoes, verses from Gilgamesh, and a translation of the Finnish tango Satumaa sung in ancient Sumerian.

When Nuntii Latini, Finland's weekly news service in Latin since 1989, was shut down in June 2019, Ammondt's translation of Presley's works into Latin was described as one of the other ways in which "Finland has distinguished itself as a bastion of the language of the Romans".
