= Arcadius Avellanus =

Hungarian-American scholar of Latin

- Born: Mogyoróssy Arkád; February 6, 1851; Esztergom, Kingdom of Hungary
- Died: June 16, 1935 (aged 84); United States
- Occupations: Classicist, scholar, educator
- Known for: Promotion of Living Latin
- Notable work: Tusculum system; Palaestra; Fabulae tusculanae

Arcadius Avellanus, born Mogyoróssy Arkád (6 February 1851 – 16 June 1935), was a Hungarian American scholar of Latin and a proponent of Living Latin.

Mogyoróssy was born in Esztergom. Few details of his life in Europe are known with certainty; he is said to have spoken Latin as a child before he was fluent in Hungarian. He studied extensively in Europe and used Latin whenever possible, in preference to any other language. He emigrated to the United States in 1878, where he adopted a Latin translation of his original name; the common hazel is "mogyoró" in Hungarian and Corylus avellana in Latin.

Avellanus edited the Praeco Latinus ("Latin Herald") in Philadelphia from 1894 to 1902. He later taught at a number of second- and third-level institutions, becoming a professor at St. John's College in Brooklyn. He founded a Latin-speaking club known as the Societas Gentium Latina, Inc. On his eightieth birthday, the club held a dinner in his honor in one of the Hungarian restaurants where he gathered nightly with friends with whom he could converse in Latin.

Avellanus advocated Latin as an international auxiliary language, deriding Esperanto as "Desperanto".

== Publications ==
His "Tusculum" system for learning spoken Latin was described in several editions:

- Tusculum; folia latina menstrua ad disciplinam linguae latinae viva voce tradendam. (published serially in Philadelphia, 1893–6)
- Palaestra, being the primer of the Tusculan system of learning, and of teaching Latin to speak; for class use and for self-instruction: (3rd edition, Philadelphia, 1908)
- Arena palaestrarum (pars prior 1893; pars secunda 1900)
- Fabulae tusculanae, ad suppeditandam praeceptoribus studiosisque materiam latinum sermonem vivae vocis adminiculo docendi et discendi. (first edition New York 1913; second edition Brooklyn 1928), a student reader

He also edited, with commentary, an edition of Corderius' Colloquia.

He made translations into Latin of popular fiction, published by Ezra Parmalee Prentice as Mount Hope Classics. Charles H. Forbes of Phillips Academy criticized the language used as not faithful to that of the classical authors. However, Avellanus was a major proponent of breaking free of classical Latin models. In response, he defended his post-classical Latinity and criticized the rationale of classicists, many of whom he despised:

Monebat Dr. Avellanus unum ex eiusmodi critica (sic) constare, praeceptores nostros nunquam antea librum Latinum vidisse praeter textus sibi ad tractandum praepositos. Nam si omnis liber qui a stylo Ciceronis differret, reiciendus esset, praeter quattuor primores auctores Romanos tota litteratura Latina binum millium annorum flammis esset abolenda: proinde patres Ecclesiae, Scholastici, Biblia Latina, omnia Chronica Monastica, opera Erasmi, Lutheri, Calvini, Philippi Melanchthonis, Capnionis, Hugonis Grotii, Baconum, omnium philologorum, physicorum, astronomorum, uno verbo, omnia opera Latina, omnes bibliothecae esset comburenda. Nemo nisi insaniat, critico eiusmodi adstipulabitur.

Translation:

Dr. Avellanus was warning that one thing was clear from this sort of criticism: that our teachers had never before seen a book in Latin except for those texts that they had been assigned to discuss. For if every book must be rejected that differs from the style of Cicero, the entire body of Latin literature of the last two thousand years, except for the first four Roman authors, must be tossed into the fire; moreover, those Church Fathers, Scholastics, the Latin Bible, all Monk Chronicles, the works of Erasmus, Luther, Calvin, Philipp Melanchthon, Capnion, Hugo Grotius, Bacon, the works of all philologists, physicists, astronomers, in one word, the whole body of Latin literature--all libraries--must be burned. Nobody, unless he's insane, will support this kind of critic.

Latin title	Year	Vol.	Translation of	Original author(s)
Pericla Nauarchi Magonis	1914	1	The Adventures of Captain Mago	David Léon Cahun
Mons Spes, et novellae aliae	1914	2	Mount-Hope, The King of the Golden River, The Necklace, The House and the Brain, The Sire de Maletroit's Door, [Svppe tiarivm mergvlarvm]	E. P. Prentice, John Ruskin, Guy de Maupassant, Edward Bulwer-Lytton, Robert Louis Stevenson, E. P. Prentice
Mysterium Arcae Boulé	1916	3	The Mystery of the Boule Cabinet	Burton Egbert Stevenson
Fabulae Divales	1918	4	The Rose Fairy Book (and an adaptation of "Cupid and Psyche" from The Golden Ass)	"Mrs Herbert Strang" (and Apuleius)
Insula Thesauraria	1922	5	Treasure Island	Robert Louis Stevenson
Vita discriminaque Robinsonis Crusoei	1928	6–7	Robinson Crusoe	Daniel Defoe
