= Jean Capelle (athlete) =

French long-distance runner (??–1962)

Personal information
- Nationality: French
- Died: 29 December 1962

Sport
- Sport: Athletics
- Event: Men's marathon

Jean Capelle (died 29 December 1962) was a French athlete. He was slated to compete in the men's marathon at the 1912 Summer Olympics, but he did not start the race.
