= Milena Minkova =

Bulgarian scholar of Latin language

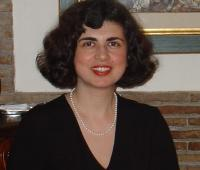
- Spouse: John Kelly
- Children: Phil Kelly tom kelly

Milena Minkova (Bulgarian: Милена Минкова) is a Bulgarian scholar of the Latin language. She has lived, studied and taught in Switzerland, Germany and Italy. She is now a resident of the United States and teaches Latin and Classics at the University of Kentucky in Lexington. Since the last decade of the 20th century, she has been one of the leading figures in the revival of the use of Latin among Latin scholars and teachers. She earned two Ph.Ds in Classics and Latin, one from the University of Sofia (1992) and the Pontifical Salesian University in Rome (1995).

She has authored several books, including The Personal Names of the Latin Inscriptions in Bulgaria (Peter Lang, 2000); The Protean Ratio (Peter Lang, 2001); Introduction to Latin Prose Composition (Bolchazy-Carducci, 2007), as well as published a translation of John Scotus Eriugena's De divisione naturae (Sofia 1994). Minkova has also published multiple articles on Latin medieval philosophy (recently on the 12th-century cosmologists Bernardus Silvestris, Alan of Lille, and Johannes de Hauvilla), Latin literature, Latin composition, and Latin pedagogy. With her colleague Terence Tunberg, Minkova has co-authored four books: Readings and Exercises in Latin Prose Composition (Focus, 2004); Reading Livy's Rome: Selections from Books I-VI Of Livy's Ab Urbe Condita (Bolchazy-Carducci, 2005); Mater Anserina: Poems in Latin for Children (Focus, 2006); Latin for the New Millennium, an introductory Latin textbook (Bolchazy-Carducci, two volumes, 2008–2009; the third volume was prepared by a different author).

She is currently working on a critical anthology of Neo-Latin texts. Minkova is an associate director of the Institute for Latin Studies at the University of Kentucky, in which students study the history of Latin from ancient Latin through to Neo-Latin and where classes are conducted in spoken Latin. Together with Tunberg, Minkova conducts various seminars and workshops in active Latin throughout the United States. Minkova is an elected fellow (Note: fellow in Latin: sodalis) of the Rome-based Academia Latinitati Fovendae, the primary international academic learned society devoted to the preservation and promotion of the use of Active Latin.

== See also ==
- Neo-Latin studies
