= The Polis Institute =

Non-profit academic institution based in Jerusalem, Israel

Polis – The Jerusalem Institute of Languages and Humanities
- פוליס – המכון ללשונות ולמדעי הרוח בירושלים (Hebrew)
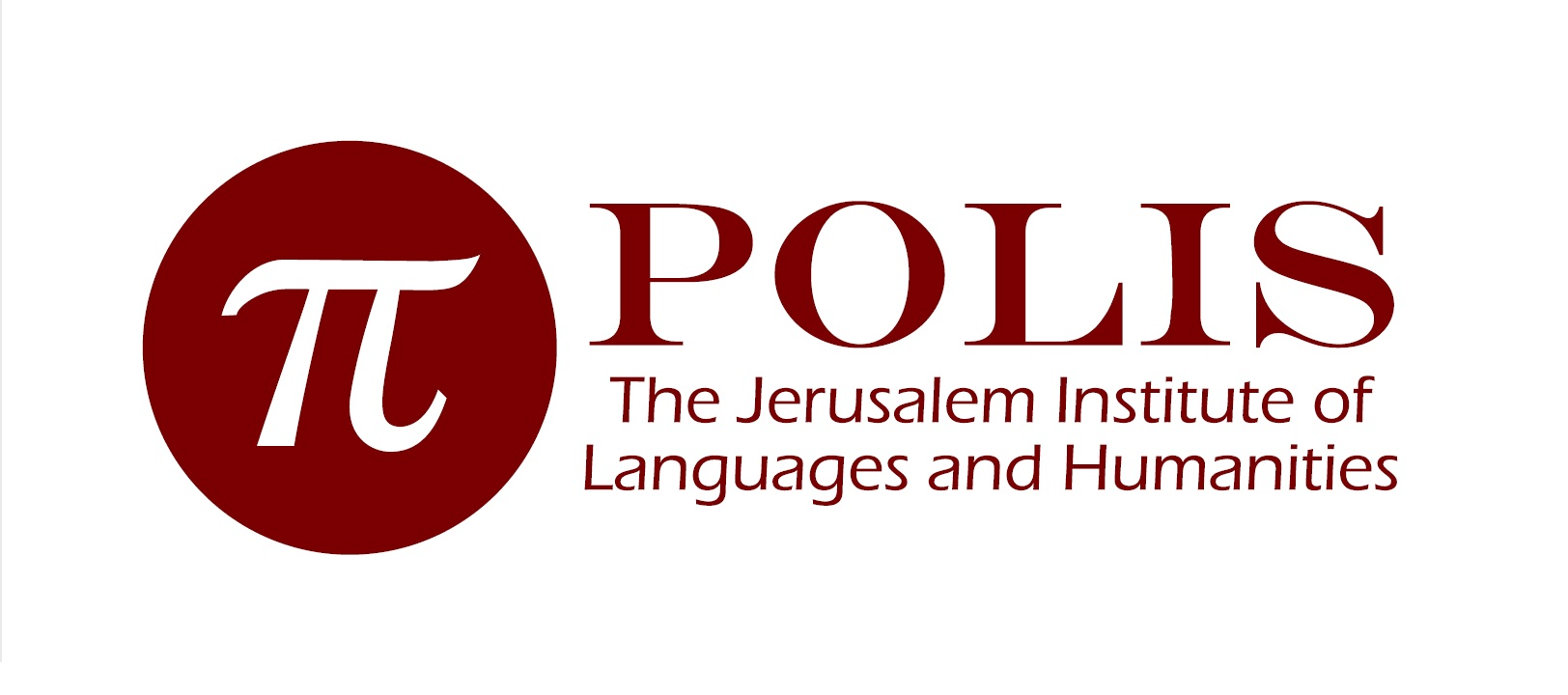
- Other name: پولــِس- معهد اللغات والعلوم الإنسانية – القدس (Arabic)
- Type: Language teaching institution focusing on ancient languages
- Established: 9 May 2011
- Dean: Christophe Rico
- Academic staff: 20
- Administrative staff: 10
- Students: 500
- Location: 8 HaAyin Het St., Musrara, Israel; 31°46′59.2″N 35°13′35.6″E
- Campus: Urban
- Language: All students are required to be fluent in English. Language courses are given in the target language.
- Symbol: π (Greek letter pi)
- Colors: Maroon and white
- Website: https://www.polisjerusalem.org/

Polis – The Jerusalem Institute of Languages and Humanities is a non-profit academic institution based in Jerusalem, Israel founded in 2011 which focuses on the humanities through the study of Western and Eastern cultural sources.

The institute was founded by a team of seven scholars from different scientific backgrounds, religions, and countries, including Israel and is located in Musrara, near the Old City of Jerusalem. Students come from more than thirty countries from six continents.

== History ==
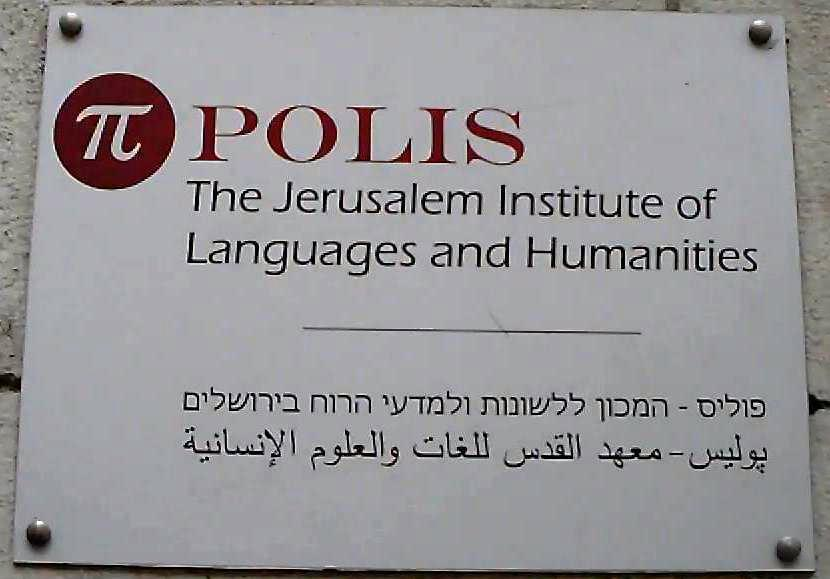
Street-view placard of Polis bearing the official name of the Institute in English, Hebrew, and Arabic

Polis and its faculty have organized intensive language courses and as well as shorter seminars and talks in Italy, Peru, Argentina, the United States, Spain, Morocco, Finland, Sweden, and the Philippines.

== The Polis Method ==
=== Theoretical Principles ===
The 'Polis Method' encompasses a variety of approaches and techniques for teaching modern languages applied to ancient languages.

==== Dynamic language development ====
Polis believes that grammatical structures must be learned according to their natural order of acquisition. It thus recognizes not only the student's continuous progression in language acquisition based on the four basic language skills of listening, speaking, reading and writing, but also the modes of discourse or literary genres – dialogue › narration › argumentation › poetry – involved in this progressive language acquisition.

Taking these principles into account, Polis puts together and adapts a wide range of approaches and teaching techniques that have been developed since the 70s in the States and Canada.

=== Practical Techniques ===
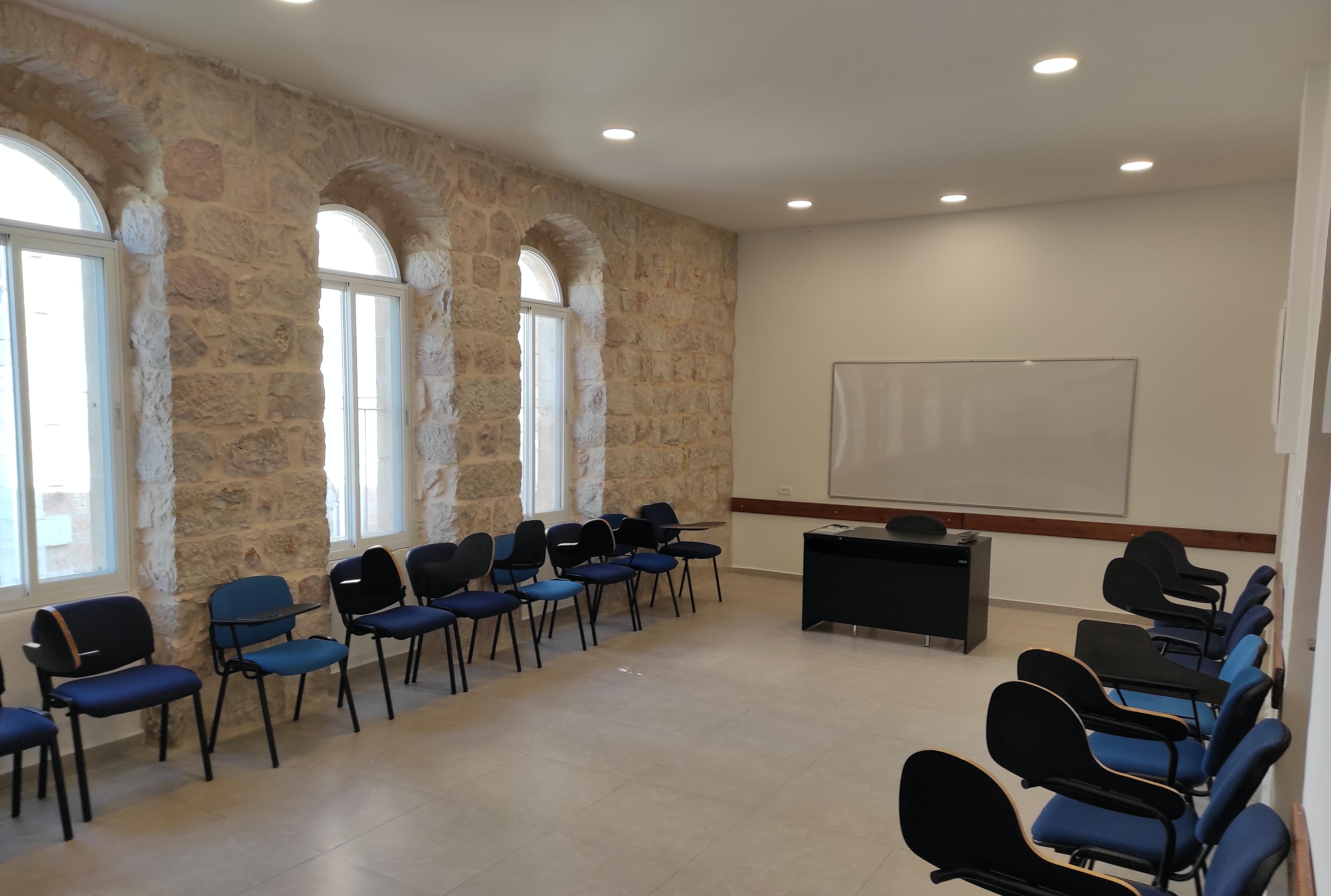
Classroom in Polis

==== Living Sequential Expression (LSE) ====
In the Polis LSE approach, students are presented with a series of sentences that express "sequences of logically connected actions" and they eventually understand the meaning of the sentences "by performing and then reporting on" the actions referred to.

==== Other activities and techniques ====
Activities that require the use of language as one of its chief components can help a great deal in creating a more natural immersive experience. With this principle in mind, Polis encourages students to attend extra-class activities such as the full immersion lunches, where students and teachers dine together while speaking exclusively in the target language.

== Academic programs ==
=== Third-party Master of Arts (MA) degrees ===
==== Master of Arts in Ancient Philology ====
The Ancient Philology MA is dedicated to the study of both Ancient Greek and Biblical Hebrew. The MA degree in Ancient Philology is granted by either the Pontifical University of the Holy Cross in Rome or the International University of Catalonia in Barcelona.

==== Master of Arts in Near Eastern Languages ====
The MA degree in Near Eastern Languages is granted by the University of Navarra in Pamplona.

=== Certificate programs ===
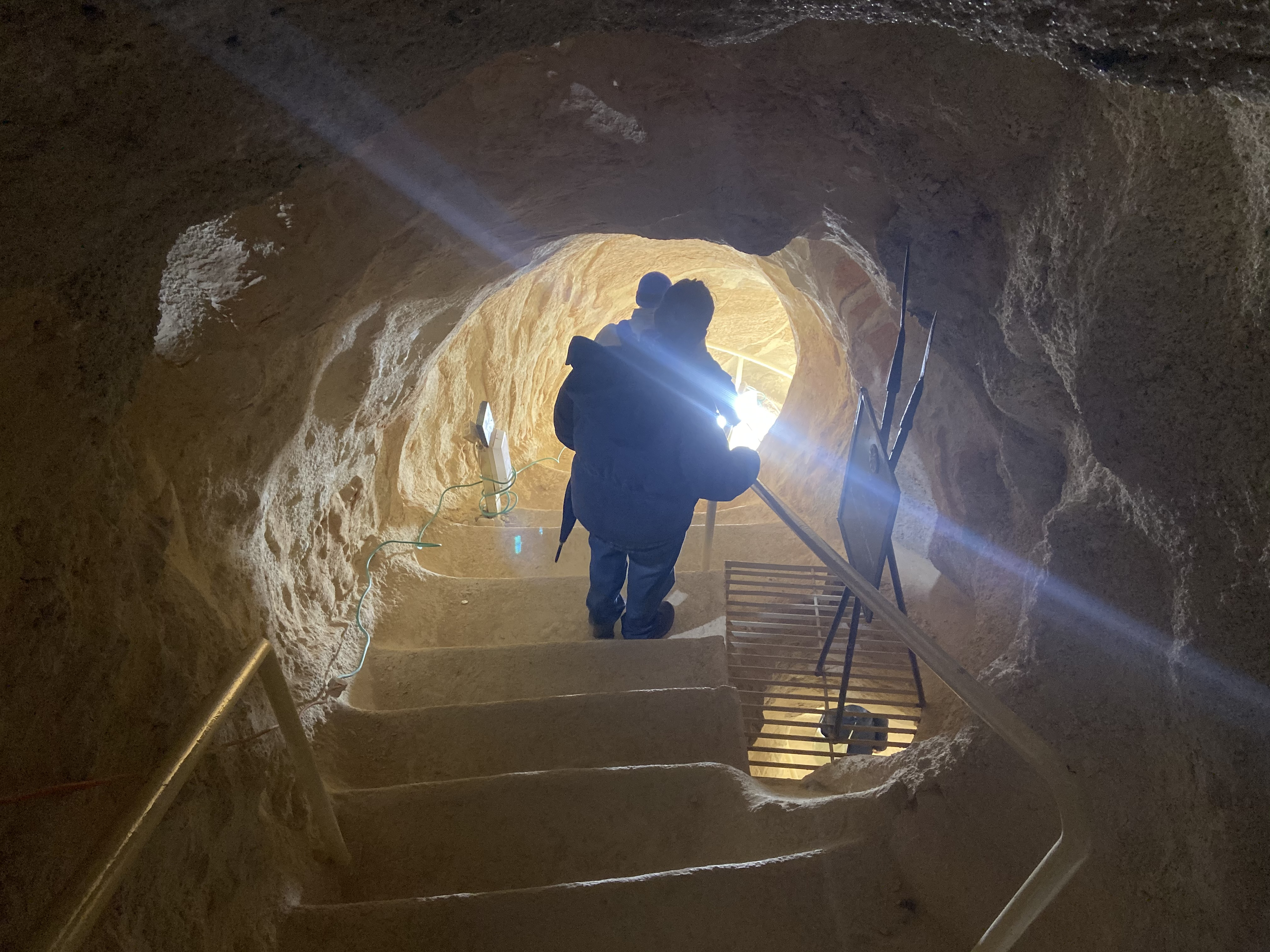
Students of Historical Geography in the underground network of the Herodian fortress developed by the Jewish rebels during the Revolt of Bar Kochba (130–135 AD).

==== Certificates in language fluency ====
Polis offers MA-level certificate programs in language fluency in Ancient Greek and Arabic.

=== Other programs ===
==== Summer programs and international programs ====
In the summer, Polis offers several intensive language courses, both in Jerusalem and abroad. Courses in Ancient Greek, Biblical Hebrew, Latin, Modern Standard Arabic and Methods in Teaching Ancient Languages have been held in Rome, Italy and the US Venues have included the Pontifical University of the Holy Cross in Rome, Christendom College in Virginia, Wisconsin, Ave Maria University in Florida, Bridgewater State University in Massachusetts, and the University of Kentucky in Lexington, Kentucky. In the Polis Institute itself, during the summer, in addition to the language courses already mentioned, Classical Syriac and Spoken Arabic are likewise taught.

==== Language courses ====
In the regular school year (October – February) Polis teaches ancient and modern language courses. Ancient languages include Ancient Greek, Biblical Hebrew, Latin, Classical Syriac, and Bohairic Coptic. Modern languages include Modern Hebrew (Ulpan), Spoken Arabic, and Modern Standard Arabic. In the past Sumerian was also taught.

== See also ==
- Education in Israel
