= Jean Capelle (politician) =

French politician (1909–1983)

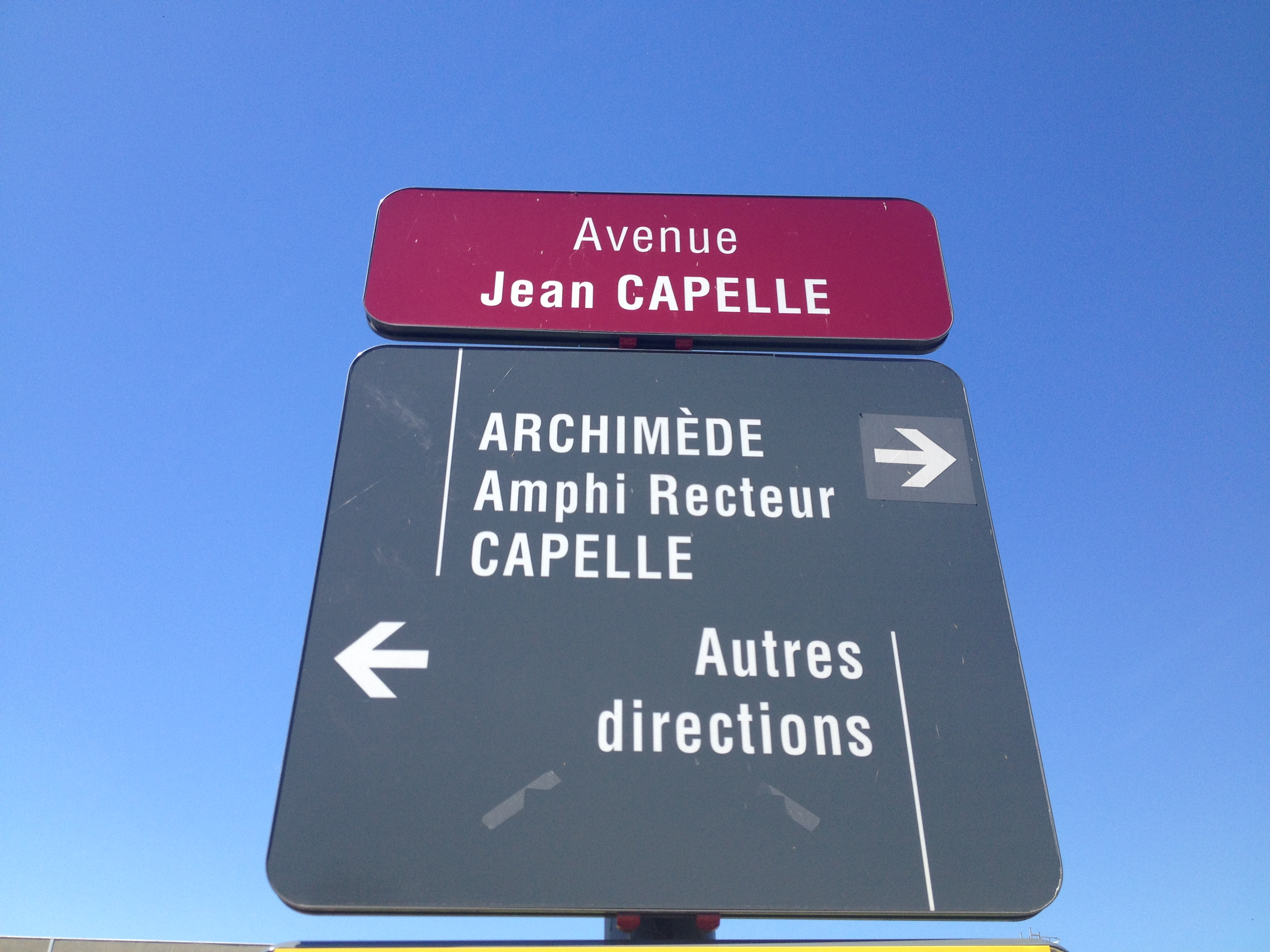
Jean Capelle Avenue, La Doua campus

Jean Capelle (16 March 1909 – 29 May 1983) was a French politician and advocate of Living Latin.

== Advocacy for Living Latin ==
Following World War II, European intellectuals and Latin scholars and enthusiasts wanted to unify the continent and revive the modern use of spoken and written Latin. In 1952, Capelle published an influential article titled Le latin ou Babel ("Latin or Babel"), proposing Latin as a modern international spoken language. This article catalyzed a series of five international conferences, held in France. Sometimes called Vita Latina conferences, their full title was: Congrès international pour le Latin vivant ("International Congress for Living Latin")
