= Hebdomada Aenigmatum =

Italian puzzle magazine in Latin

Hebdomada Aenigmatum is the first magazine of crosswords in Latin.

== Contents ==
The magazine features several crosswords and word puzzles in Latin, a variation of Sudoku with Roman numerals, a section with global news, a comic strip of Incredibilis Snupius (English: Snoopy) and a section on miscellaneous subjects (including films, recipes and sport). Special editions included two Christmas editions (“Editio Natalicia”) in December 2014 and December 2015 and the “Ego sum Carolus” (Je suis Charlie) edition in January 2015 to support freedom of speech after the terrorist attack at the French satirical weekly newspaper Charlie Hebdo in Paris.

The first crossword puzzle in ancient Greek appeared in April 2015 as an annex to the 9th issue of Hebdomada Aenigmatum. It developed into a separate magazine with the name of Ὀνόματα Kεχιασμένα (Onomata Kechiasmena). with crosswords, word puzzles, join-the-dots where the dots are sequentially marked with Greek letters, a strip of Asterix in ancient Greek, two pages of recent news in ancient Greek in collaboration with Akropolis World News.

== Organization and initiatives ==
Launched in June 2014, Hebdomada Aenigmatum is published monthly and is available free of charge upon registration on the website. The editor-in-chief is Lucas Cupidus in collaboration with Herimannus Novocomensis, Iconoclastes, Lydia Ariminensis, Theodorus.

A contest of Latin crosswords (Certamen Aenigmatum Latinorum) has been organized twice by the Greek-Latin Festival in 2016 and 2018 at the École normale supérieure de Lyon. Latin crosswords have been the subject of several conferences at Scuola Normale Superiore di Pisa.

Both Hebdomada Aenigmatum and Onomata Kechiasmena are included in a memorandum of understanding with the Italian Ministry of Education to promote the use of Latin and Greek crosswords as a tool to facilitate learning ancient languages.
