= CERCAM =

International research center

The CERCAM is an international research center founded in 1990 at the Université Paul Valéry of Montpellier (France) through the association of several research groups. The CERCAM’s library was founded with donations from the professors Émilienne Demougeot (1910-1994) and Bernard Schouler. CERCAM means Centre d’étude et de recherche sur les civilisations antiques de la Méditerranée / Centre for the study and research of the ancient civilisations of the Mediterranean. It comprises several research teams and welcomes researchers and students working on ancient Greece and Rome in the fields of both history and classics.

It brings together historians of the Greco-Roman world, some of whom focus on archaeology, philologists and specialists of Greek and Roman literature. Its members work on subjects covering five major themes relating to the ancient Mediterranean world :

- History of mentalities, particularly in Roman Africa
- Heritage of ancient thought
- Anthropological and literary studies
- Research on the occupation and representation of space and economic and social exchanges
- Rhetoric and politics in the Greco-Roman world
