= W. H. D. Rouse =

British teacher and classicist (1863–1950)

- Born: William Henry Denham Rouse; 30 May 1863; Calcutta, British India
- Died: 10 February 1950 (aged 86); Hayling Island, England
- Education: Regent's Park College; Christ's College, Cambridge, D.Litt., 1903
- Occupations: Education administrator and translator
- Writing career
- Period: 20th century
- Genre: Historical fiction

William Henry Denham Rouse (/raʊz/; 30 May 1863 – 10 February 1950) was a British educator, academic administrator, editor, and translator. He was the master of Rugby School and headmaster of The Perse School. He was a pioneering teacher who advocated the use of the "direct method" of teaching Latin and Greek. He was a founding editor of the Loeb Classical Library.

== Early life ==
Rouse was born in Calcutta, British India, on 30 May 1863. After his family returned home on leave to Britain, Rouse was sent to Regent's Park College in London, where he studied as a lay student. In 1881, he won a scholarship to Christ's College, Cambridge. He achieved a double first in the Classical Tripos at the University of Cambridge, where he also studied Sanskrit. He became a Fellow of Christ's College in 1888, and later received the degree Doctor in Letters from the college in early 1903.

== Career ==
After brief spells at Bedford School (1886–1888) and Cheltenham College (1890–1895), Rouse became a master at Rugby School, where he encouraged Arthur Ransome to become a writer, against his parents' wishes. Ransome later wrote: "My greatest piece of good fortune in coming to Rugby was that I passed so low into the school ... that I came at once into the hands of a most remarkable man whom I might otherwise never have met. This was Dr W. H. D. Rouse."

Rouse was appointed headmaster of The Perse School in Cambridge in 1902. He restored it to a sound financial footing following a crisis. He believed firmly in learning by doing as well as by seeing and hearing. Although the curriculum at the Perse was dominated by classics, he urged that science should be learned through experiment and observation. He was described by the school archivist as the school's greatest headmaster: "Rouse was strongly independent to the point of eccentricity. He hated most machines, all bureaucracy and public exams." He retired from teaching in 1928.

In 1911 Rouse started a successful series of summer schools for teachers to encourage the use of the direct method of teaching Latin and Greek. The Association for the Reform of Latin Teaching (ARLT) was formed in 1913 as a result of these seminars.

The same year, James Loeb chose W.H.D. Rouse, together with two other eminent classical scholars, T. E. Page and Edward Capps, to be founding editors of the Loeb Classical Library.

Rouse is known for his plain English prose translations of Homer's Odyssey (1937) and Iliad (1938). He is also recognized for his translations of some of Plato's dialogues, including The Republic, Apology, Crito, and Phaedo.

== Death and legacy ==
Rouse died on Hayling Island on 10 February 1950, at the age of 86.

Rouse is remembered as one of the most influential figures in the history of The Perse School, Cambridge, where he served as headmaster from 1902 to 1928. He has been described by the school's own archivist as its greatest headmaster, on account of both his rescue of the school from financial crisis and his lasting influence on its teaching methods. His pioneering "direct method" of teaching Latin and Greek, and the summer schools he established for teachers from 1911, led directly to the founding of the Association for the Reform of Latin Teaching in 1913, an organisation that continues to promote his teaching philosophy.

The Perse continues to commemorate Rouse's name through the Rouse Award, an internally assessed independent research programme for Lower Sixth students, in which pupils undertake a formal piece of original research under the guidance of a subject specialist before presenting their work to a panel of governors and academics. More than 150 Rouse projects are completed by pupils each year, with a shortlist of finalists selected for a viva-style interview before a small number of overall winners are announced.

== Select bibliography ==
=== Books ===
- The Giant Crab, and Other Tales from Old India. W. H. D. Rouse, 1897
- The Talking Thrush, and Other Tales from India. E.P. Dutton & Co., 1899
- Demonstrations in Latin elegiac verse. The Clarendon Press, 1899
- Greek Votive Offerings; an Essay in the History of Greek Religion, 1902
- The Jataka: or, Stories of the Buddha's Former Births (6 volumes), 1895-1907
- Lucian's Dialogues Prepared for Schools with Short Notes in Greek, 1909
- Joseph Pennell's Pictures in the Land of Temples, J.B. Lippincott Co., 1915
- Gods, Heroes and Men of Ancient Greece: Mythology's Great Tales of Valor and Romance, 1934
- The Arabian Nights - Illustrated by Walter Paget

=== Translations ===
- Apocolocyntosis: or Ludus de morte Claudii: The Pumpkinification of Claudius. by Lucius Annaeus Seneca, 1902
- Apuleius, The most pleasant and delectable tale of the marriage of Cupid and Psyche. 1914
- The Odyssey: The Story of Odysseus. 1937
- Homer: The Iliad: The Story of Achillês. 1938
- Nonnus: Dionysiaca, in Three Volumes. 1940
- Plato, Great Dialogues of Plato. 1956
- The March Up Country: A Translation of Xenophon's Anabasis. 1958
