= Eduard Johnson =

German historian, classicist, author and teacher (1840–1903)

- Born: February 16, 1840; Freiberg, Germany
- Died: September 7, 1903 (aged 63); Sachsgrün, Germany
- Occupations: local historian, teacher, classicist, nonfiction author

Academic work
- Discipline: Classical philology; Local History
- Institutions: Leipzig University (1860-1863); Königliches Gymnasium Plauen (1864-1881); Königliches Gymnasium Chemnitz (1881-1895); Vogtländische Anzeiger und Tageblatt (1895-1903)
- Notable works: Sprechen Sie Lateinisch? (1888); Sprechen Sie Attisch? (1889); Geschichtliches über Burgstein im Vogtland und seine Umgebung (1889)

Wilhelm August Eduard Johnson (Note: Although the name "Johnson" appears to be an English name, it is not. The original form of the family name was apparently "Joh(a)nsson".) (February 16, 1840 – September 7, 1903) was a German classicist, teacher, journalist and local historian. He used the pseudonyms E. Joannides and Georg Capellanus.

== Early life and education ==
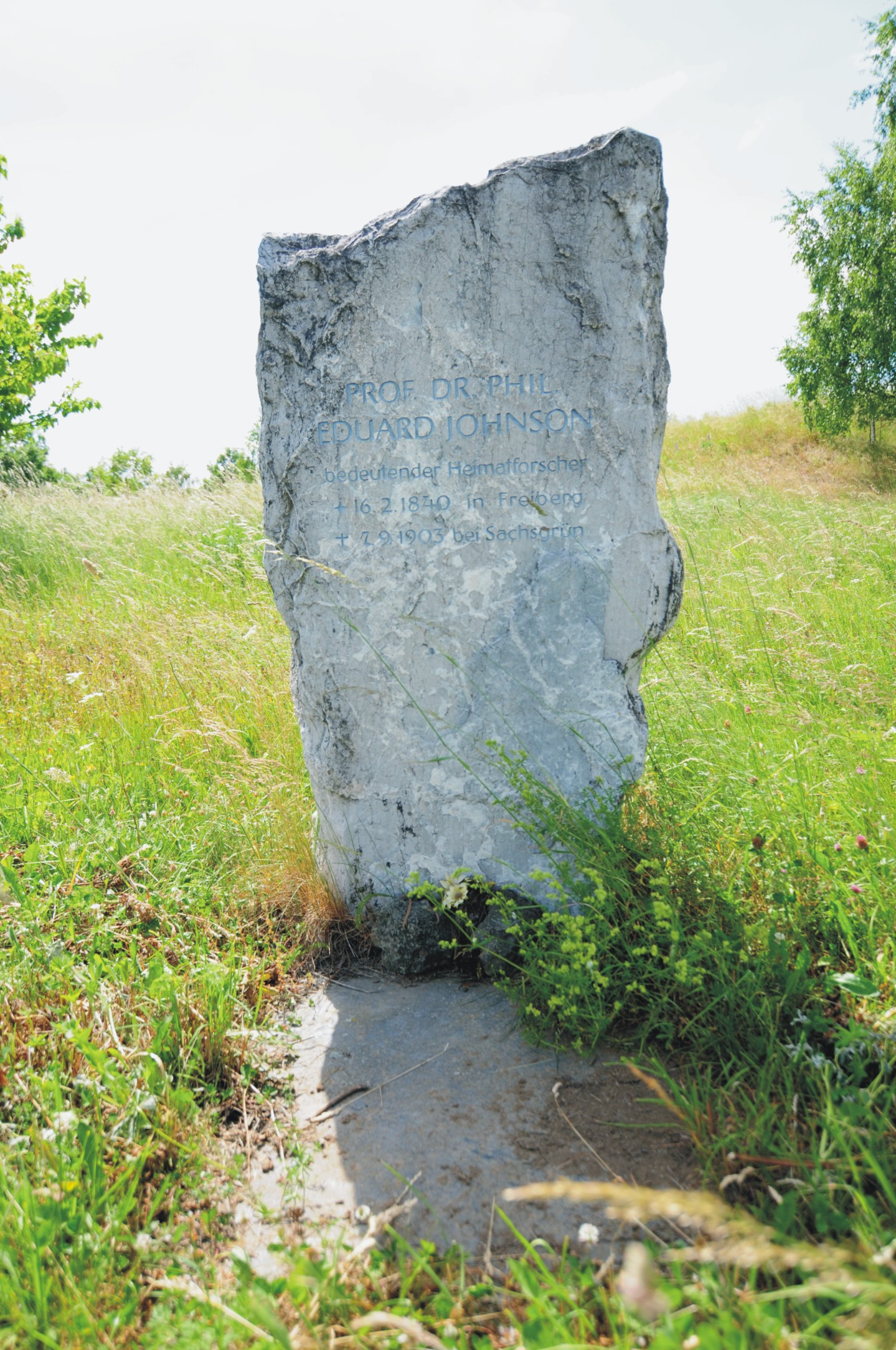
Monument to Eduard Johnson near Sachsgrün, Saxony, Germany, in what used to be the inner-German border zone

Karl-Schmidt-Rottluff-Gymnasium in Chemnitz, Germany, preserves the facade of the old Königliches Gymnasium building where Johnson taught from 1881 to 1895

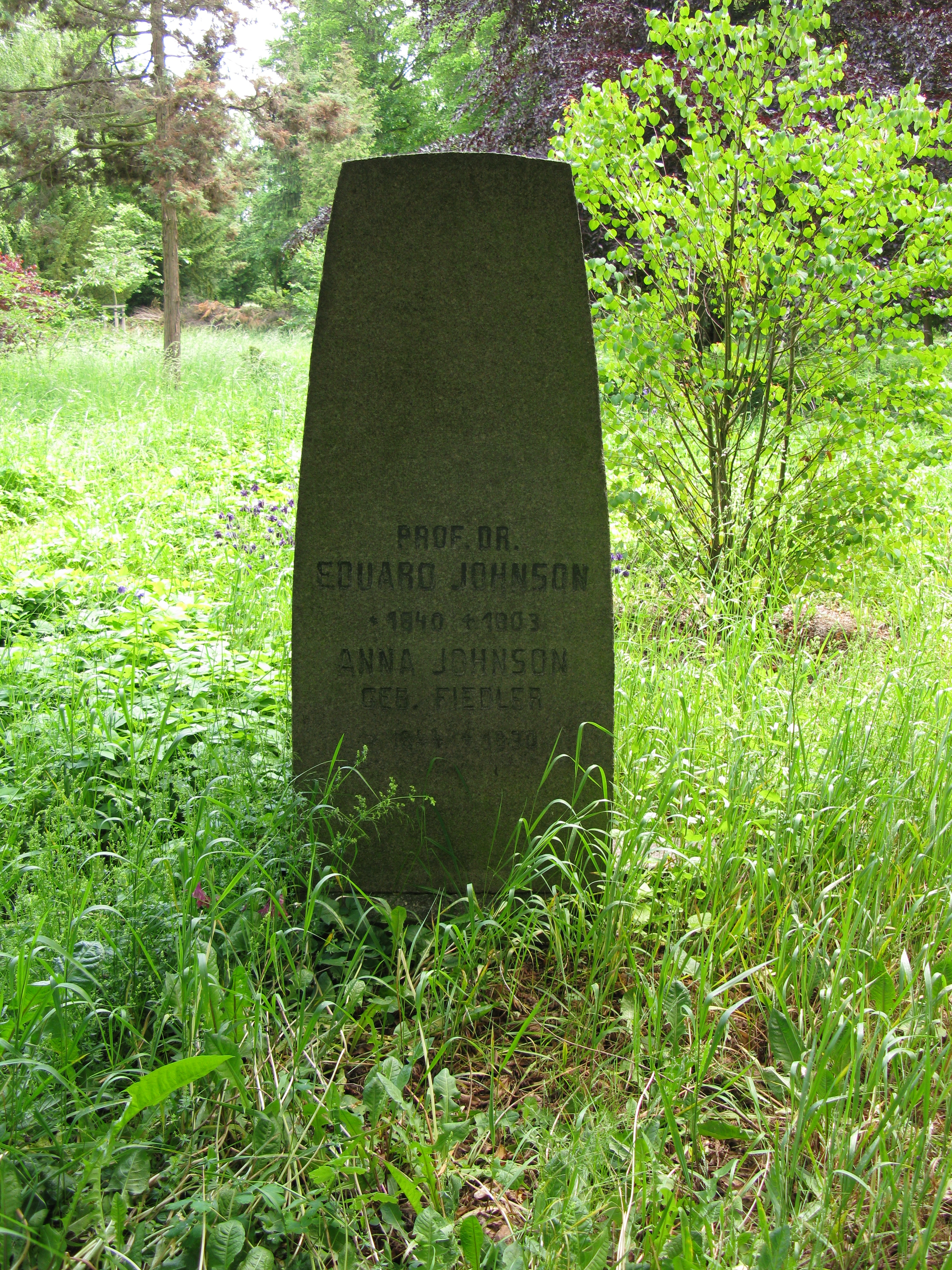
Heritage-protected grave marker for Eduard Johnson in Cemetery II in the Central Cemetery in Plauen, Germany.

After attending primary school and the Gymnasium (university-track secondary school) in his home town of Freiberg, Germany, Johnson studied philosophy and philology at the university in Leipzig, with the intention of becoming a teacher at an advanced secondary school. He passed the state exam and earned a Doctor of Philosophy degree.

== Career ==
In 1864, he began his probationary year of teaching at the Plauen Gymnasium. He taught Latin, Greek, German and History. In 1865 he finished his probationary year and earned a fixed employment position at the school.

While employed as a teacher, he published philosophical works on the problem of Sensualism and made extensive investigations into the history of the Vogtland in Saxony, Germany. After his transfer to the Chemnitz Gymnasium in 1881, he used his free time for excursions to the Vogtland. As a historian he published several reports on the history of notable individuals and castles in the Vogtland. Between 1896 and 1903 he published over 162 articles under the title Vogtländische Altertümer (Vogtland Antiquities).

Johnson worried about the waning influence of Ancient Greek and Latin. He pseudonymously published two books cataloguing colloquial phrases and vocabulary in order to promote the active use of Greek and Latin in everyday life. These were bilingual phrasebooks in Attic Greek/German and Latin/German.

Journalism was Johnson's other passion. He served as part-time editor of the newspaper Vogtländische Anzeiger und Tageblatt, until finally in 1895 he resigned his position as teacher and became the head editor. At this time the Vogtländische Anzeiger was the most popular newspaper in the Vogtland.

== Death and legacy ==
Eduard Johnson died after a heart attack during an expedition in Fuchspöhl, west of the village of Sachsgrün, which is today the community of Triebel/Vogtl. On that spot, a small stone monument was erected in his honor in 2007, and a plaque added in 2008.

An older monument to Johnson had previously existed on that spot. It was erected on July 6, 1941, However, that older monument was later lost due to the expansion of the inner-German border zone between East and West Germany.

The Plauen Central Cemetery has a page describing Johnson's headstone (in German), along with a photo of Johnson, a photo of the dedication ceremony for his monument, a scan of a contemporary newspaper article (in German) and a few other photos.

== Works ==
- E. Joannides: Sprechen Sie Attisch? Moderne Konversation in altgriechischer Umgangssprache nach den besten attischen Autoren. Auflage Koch, Dresden und Leipzig 1902 (in German and Ancient Greek). Second edition [with "many additions" according to the Foreword].
  - New edition revised, edited and expanded by Helmut Schareika: Ἆρ’ ἀττικίζεις; – Sprechen Sie Attisch? Moderne Konversation in altgriechischer Umgangssprache, Buske, Hamburg 2012, ISBN 978-3875486377
  - Italian translation: Parlare greco oggi: Conversazione moderna in greco antico, a cura di Enrico Renna e Claudio Ferone, Fratelli Ariello editori, Napoli 1998. (No ISBN.)
  - English translation: Do You Speak Attic Greek? (2025 English Edition), Aristophanic Cloud Publishing, 2025. ISBN 979-8-90030-048-1.
- Georg Capellanus: Sprechen Sie Lateinisch? Moderne Konversation in lateinischer Sprache. 13th edition, Ferd. Dümmler, Bonn 1966 (in German and Latin).
  - Famous Book review (in German) of Sprechen Sie Lateinisch by Kurt Tucholsky, first published in Vossische Zeitung on June 23, 1925.
  - Russian translation: Говорите ли Вы на латыни? / Георг Капеллан; пер. И. Р. Гимадеева, И. С. Селиванова; под ред. А. И. Солопова. — М.: Издательство книжной лавки «Листва», 2021. — 164 с. ISBN 978-5-6043461-6-7
  - English translation: Latin Can Be Fun (Facetiae Latinae): A Modern Conversational Guide (Sermo Hodiernus Antique Redditus). Translated by Peter Needham. London, Souvenir Press Ltd., 1977. ISBN 978-1566199919
- Eduard Johnson: Geschichtliches über Burgstein im Vogtland und seine Umgebung. (Historical Notes on Burgstein in the Vogtland and its Surroundings ) Wieprecht, Plauen 1897. Reprint: Vogtländischer Heimatverlag Neupert, Plauen 1990, ISBN 3-929039-03-6.
- Eduard Johnson: Zur Lebensgeschichte des Kabinettsministers Detlev Grafen Einsiedel. In: Neues Archiv für sächsische Geschichte. Volume 12, 1891, pp. 175–177.
- E. Johnson: Urkundliches über den ersten Kartoffel-Feldbau in Sachsen. In: Neues Archiv für sächsische Geschichte. Volume 23, 1902, pp. 150–155.
