= Michael von Albrecht =

German classical scholar and translator (born 1933)

- Born: 22 August 1933 (age 93)
- Occupations: Scholar; translator; poet

Michael von Albrecht (born 22 August 1933 in Stuttgart) is a German classical scholar and translator, as well as a poet writing in Latin.

== Life ==
The son of the composer Georg Albrecht, Michael von Albrecht first attended the Music Academy in Stuttgart, where he graduated in 1955 after taking the state examination. In Tübingen and Paris, he then studied classical philology and Indology in 1959. In 1964, Albrecht was appointed professor of classical philology at the University of Heidelberg, where he remained until his retirement in 1998. He was also the Visiting Professor at the University of Amsterdam and a visiting member at the Institute for Advanced Study in Princeton in 1981. Michael von Albrecht's research focuses on ancient music, Roman literature and its reception, history, and comparative literature. His two-volume history of Roman literature has been translated into eight languages. He has also become well known for translations of Latin literature into German, especially Virgil and Ovid. In 1998, he received an honorary doctorate from the Aristotle University of Thessaloniki. For his translations of Latin, he was awarded the Johann Heinrich Voss Award for excellent translation in 2004.

== Selected works ==
- 1964 Silius Italicus: Freiheit und Gebundenheit römischer Epik
- 1968 Ovid (Wege der Forschung; Mitherausgeber)
- 1971 Meister römischer Prosa von Cato bis Apuleius
- 1972 Goethe und das Volkslied
- 1972 Der Teppich als literarisches Motiv
- 1973 Marcus Tullius Cicero, Sprache und Stil
- 1977 Römische Poesie
- 1987 Die römische Literatur in Text und Darstellung (Hrsg. von Bd. 3)
- 1988 Rom: Spiegel Europas. Texte und Themen (2. Auflage 1998)
- 1989 Scripta Latina
- 1992 Geschichte der römischen Literatur (2. Auflage 1994; Besprechung
- 1999 Roman Epic. An Interpretative Introduction
- 2000 Das Buch der Verwandlungen
- 2000 Vergil, Eklogen
- 2003 Literatur als Brücke : Studien zur Rezeptionsgeschichte und Komparatistik
- 2004 Wort und Wandlung. Senecas Lebenskunst
- 2005 Lukrez in der europäischen Kultur
- 2005 Bibliographie zum Fortwirken der Antike in den deutschsprachigen Literaturen des 19. und 20. Jahrhunderts (mit Walther Kißel und Werner Schubert)
- 2006 'Vergil' .Bucolica, Georgica, Aeneis. Eine Einführung. Heidelberg, 2006.
