= Nuntii Latini =

Latin language news service

Nuntii Latini was a Finnish service providing news reports in Latin.

== Finnish Nuntii Latini ==
The Finnish Nuntii Latini was a Finnish news service broadcast in Latin between September 1989 and June 2019, operated by the Finnish national broadcaster Yle (Radiophonia Finnica Generalis) on the Yle Radio 1 channel. The name Nuntii Latini is Latin for Latin News or News in Latin. The program was eventually made available on the internet and attracted worldwide media attention.

=== Station output ===
The Latin program was a five-minute long weekly broadcast of recent world news and human interest. The program was eventually made available on the Internet and had about 40,000 listeners according to RTÉ in 2019, compared to 75,000 reported by the BBC in 2006. Articles were usually alternately read by a male and female announcer, in Latin. Pronunciation was, for the most part, "classical" and listeners could follow a written transcript of news items. A "Glossarium programmatis" was provided for each program translating 6 to 10 of the key Latin terms into Finnish, English, and German.

The program was founded by three Latinists: Tuomo Pekkanen, a professor of Latin at Jyväskylä University and a member of the learned society Academia Latinitati Fovendae (ALF); Reijo Pitkäranta, a lecturer in Latin at Helsinki University; and Virpi Seppälä-Pekkanen, also from Helsinki University. As of 2013, Laura Nissinen was one of the announcers. The program has been described as one of several ways in which Finland has been a bastion of Latin, such as the translation of the works of Elvis Presley into Latin by Finnish academic Jukka Ammondt.

=== Shutdown ===
In November 2017, Yle announced that they would be shutting down the broadcast in December of that year. Yle cited the availability of other Latin-language media on the internet as one of the reasons for the shutdown. Another reason was the difficulty in finding suitable replacements for the programme's ageing producers. The announcement resulted in a public campaign to save the program. More than 3,000 listeners wrote to the station in protest, resulting in the show being extended through 2019. The final broadcast was on 14 June 2019.

=== Audio archive of Nuntii Latini ===
A complete audio archive of Nuntii Latini in MP3 format is available at Weebly. (See External Links, below.)

=== Similar services in Latin and Ancient Greek ===
- Ephemeris (Online News Outlet): Covers current global events, politics, science, and culture in Latin.
- Hebdomada Papae (Radio Broadcast / Podcast): Produced by Vatican Radio / Vatican News, this weekly news service delivers world news and Holy See reports in Latin.
- Akropolis World News (Online News Snippets): Created by Juan Coderch (University of St Andrews), this platform provides weekly world news bulletins written in Ancient Greek (text only).
