= Terence Tunberg =

American Latinist (born 1950)

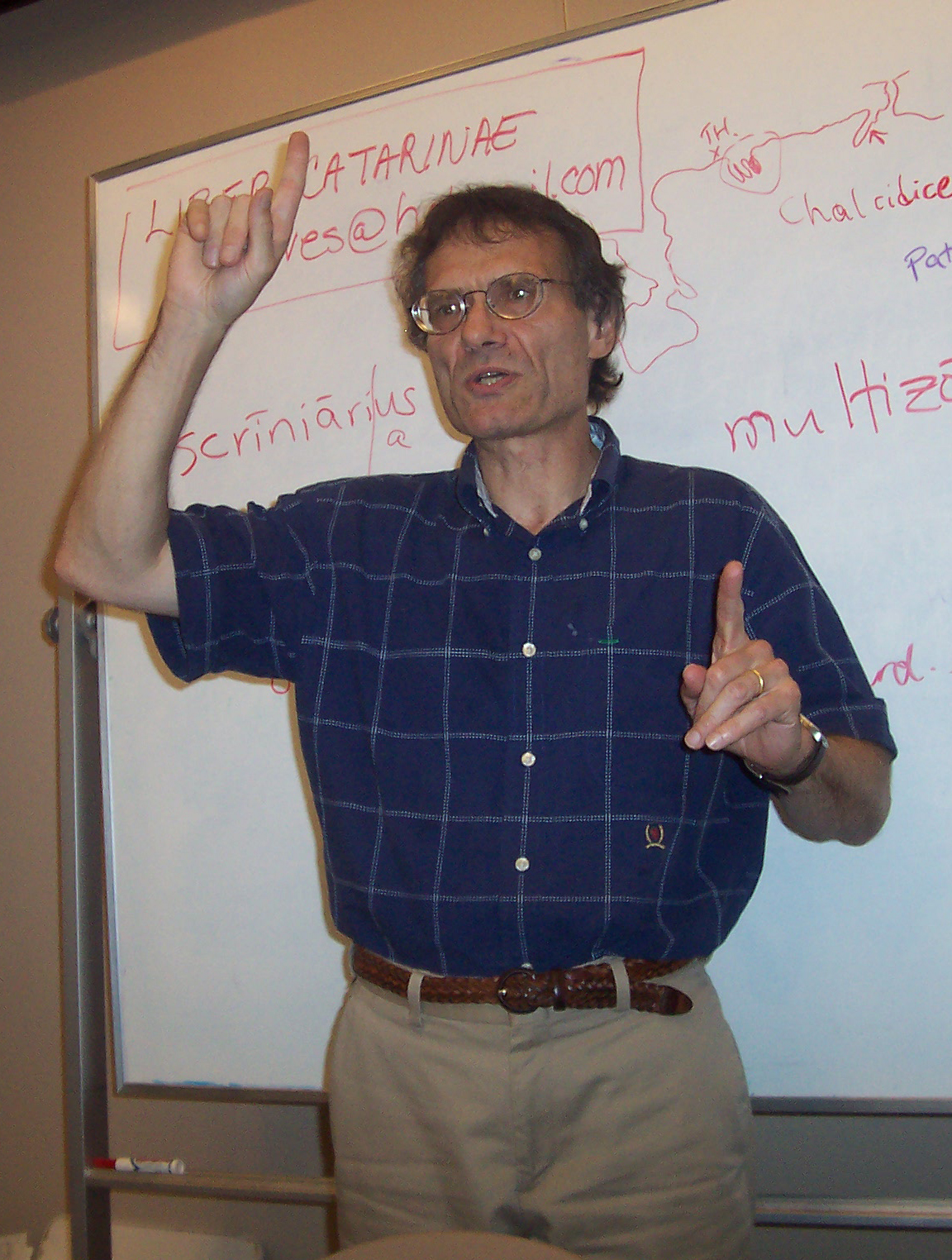
- Tunberg in 2004
- Born: August 1950 (age 76)
- Occupation: Latinist
- Spouse: Jennifer Tunberg
- Parent: Karl Tunberg

Terence Tunberg (born August 1950) is an American Latinist. He is a professor of Latin at the University of Kentucky, specializing in Neo-Latin studies, especially the use of Ciceronian language and the use of spoken Latin as a teaching tool. He is also Director of the university's Institute for Latin Studies. His academic output is in both Latin and English.

== Translator of children's books ==
Terence and Jennifer Tunberg, his wife, have translated a number of children's books into Latin. These include Quomodo Invidiosulus Nomine Grinchus Christi Natalem Abrogaverit: How the Grinch Stole Christmas in Latin in 1998, Cattus Petasatus: The Cat in the Hat in Latin in 2000, Arbor Alma: The Giving Tree in Latin in 2002, and Green Eggs and Ham in Latin: Virent Ova! Viret Perna in 2003.

They described translations of The Grinch as difficult, given the informality of the language, but attempted something that was playful but not so idiomatic as to be hard to read.

== Use of spoken Latin in pedagogy ==
He is a "proponent of Latin speaking as a means of helping with language learning and, for more advanced students, as a way to consolidate knowledge of the language." He founded and convenes the annual Lexington Latin Conventiculum, the first of its kind in the United States.

Together with Milena Minkova, Tunberg founded an MA program in Latin that uses the language as the medium of instruction in the University of Kentucky in 2000. Students from these programs have gone on to found their own Living Latin events around the US, helping to build the practice. While he is "convinced that using Latin for communication and active discourse with students enhances the quality of both learning and teaching", he also believes that Latin should be taught differently from living languages, not least as reading is an early goal, and does not practice "full immersion", i.e., teaching Latin through Latin at an early stage.

In 1998, Tunberg was elected a fellow of the Academia Latinitati Fovendae, the primary international academic learned society devoted to the preservation and promotion of the use of Active Latin. His own spoken Latin is of a very high standard, sometimes better than his English, and he is able to "discuss absolutely any subject in Latin with clarity and eloquence."

== Select bibliography ==
- 1986: "What is Boncompagno's 'Newest Rhetoric'?", Traditio
- 1987: "Conrad of Hirsau and his Approach to the Auctores", Medievalia et Humanistica 15
- 1987: Oculus Pastoralis (dissertation)
- 1987: "Conrad of Hirsau and his approach to the Auctores" in The Early Renaissance (editore P.M. Clogan)
- 1988: "The Latinity of Lorenzo Valla's Gesta Ferdinandi regis Aragonum", in Humanistica Lovaniensia, vol. 37, pp. 30–78.
- 1989: "De orbe terrarum ab hominibus inquinato", in Latinitas, Dec., 1989, pp. 299–308.
- 1990: Oculus Pastoralis (versio publica)
- 1992: "A study of clausulae in selected works by Lorenzo Valla", in Humanistica Lovaniensia, vol. 41, pp. 104–133.
- 1996: (cum Tournoy) "On the Margins of Latinity? Neo-Latin and the Vernacular Languages", Humanistica Lovaniensia 45, pp. 134–175
- 1996: "Notes on Seven Declamations by Erasmus", Humanistica Lovaniensia 45
- 1997: "Proposita nova ex America", in Melissa, n° 77, anno 1997, p. 5.
- 1997: (with Tournoy) "Ciceronian Latin: Longolius and Others", Humanistica Lovaniensia 46, pp. 13–61
- 1998: "Catalogus operum recens editorum quae ad sermonis Neolatini proprietates spectant" (pars prior), in Retiario, n° 1.2
- 1998: "Praefatio" (ad editionem Iani Nicii Erythraei EUDEMIAE libros) in Retiario, n° 1.2
- 1998: (with Guenevera Tunberg) Quomodo Invidiosulus Nomine Grinchus Christi Natalem Abrogaverit
- 1998: "Howlett, D. R., ed,. Dictionary of Medieval Latin from British Sources. Fascicule V (I-J-K-L)", The Medieval Review
- 1999: "Catalogus operum recens editorum quae ad sermonis Neolatini proprietates spectant" (pars altera), in Retiario, n° 2.2
- 1999: "Iam cogitandum est de Latinitate proximo millenio colenda" (epistola), in Melissa, n° 91, p. 16.
- 1999: "Neo-Latin Language and Literature", in ed. P. Grendler Encyclopaedia of the Renaissance, vol. 4, pp. 289–94.
- 1999: "Observations on the Style and Language of Lipsius' Prose: A Look at Some Selected Texts", in editoribus G. Tournoy et al. Justus Lipsius Europae Lumen et Columen, Supplementa Humanistica Lovaniensia 15, pp. 169–78.
- 2000: "Latinitas. The Misdiagnosis of Latin's Rigor Mortis", in ACL Newsletter 22.2, pp. 21–26.
- 2000: "Cur opera Latina non solum antiqua, sed recentiora etiam omnibus litterarum Latinarum studiosis tam in ludis quam in studiorum universitatibus proponi praelegique debeant." in Retiario, n° 3.1
- 2000: (with Guenevera Tunberg) Cattus Petasatus: The Cat in the Hat in Latin
- 2001: "De duobus libris recens editis", Retiario, n° 4.1
- 2001: "De novo instituto Latino", in Melissa, n° 104, anno 2001, p. 1.
- 2001: "Catalogus Operum Recens Editorum Quae ad Latinitatis Humanisticae et Recentissimae Proprietates Spectant" (Retiarii editio supernumeraria)
- 2001: "De Marco Antonio Mureto Oratore et Gallo et Romano", Humanistica Lovaniensia 50, pp. 303–27
- 2002: "Cur opera Latina non solum classica, sed recentiora etiam omnibus litterarum classicarum studiosis proponi praelegique debeant", in editoribus B. Luiselli, E. Palmén, T. Pekkanen Acta selecta noni conventus Academiae Latinitati Fovendae (Granivici, 6-12 Augusti MCMXCVII), pp. 219–225
- 2002: (with Guenevera Tunberg) Arbor Alma: The Giving Tree in Latin
- 2003: (with Guenevera Tunberg) Green Eggs and Ham in Latin: Virent Ova! Viret Perna
- 2004: (with Minkova) "De rationibus variis quibus homines verba Latina aetate litterarum renatarum enuntiabant", in Melissa, n° 122, anno 2004, pp. 2–7
- 2004: (with Minkova) Readings and exercises in Latin prose composition: from Antiquity to the Renaissance
- 2004: "The Latinity of Erasmus and Medieval Latin: Continuities and Discontinuities", Journal of Medieval Latin 14, pp. 145–168
- 2005: "De litterarum Latinarum perpetuitate: pars altera", Iris 13, pp. 23–24.
- 2005: (with Minkova) Reading Livy's Rome: selections from books I-VI of Livy's Ab urbe condita
- 2005: (with Minkova) "Oral Latin: Loquimur Quo Melius Legamus – We Speak to Read Better", in Amphora 4.2, pp. 8–9, 16–17.
- 2005: "Observations on the Pronunciation of Latin during the Renaissance", The Classical Outlook 82.2, pp. 68–71.
- 2006: (with Minkova) Mater Anserina: Poems in Latin for Children
- 2006: "De moribus Americanorum domesticis", (versio partialis Franciscae Trollope Domesting Manners of the Americans) in editrice F. Licoppe-Deraedt Navigare Necesse Est: Quattuordecim viatoriae narrationes veste Latina indutae, Miscellanea Gaio Licoppe dicata.
- 2006: (with Minkova) "De Kentukiano instituto studiis Latinis provehendis", Pars I: "De Instituti ortu et ratione", in editoribus A. Capellán García, M. D. Alonso Saiz, Acta selecta X Conventus Academiae Latinitati Fovendae (Matriti, 2-7 Septembris 2002), pp. 283–5.
- 2006: "De Erasmi declamationibus deque declamatiuncula, quae Oratio episcopi inscribitur", Humanistica Lovaniensia 55, pp. 9–23.
- 2008: (with Minkova) Latin for the New Millennium
- 2009: (with Minkova) Latin for the New Millennium: Level 2
- 2012: "De rationibus quibus homines docti artem Latine colloquendi et ex tempore dicendi saeculis XVI et XVII coluerunt", Supplementa humanistica Lovaniensia 31
- 2012?: De Latine dicendi normis, quas scriptores recentiores (vel neoterici) servasse videntur (hic etiam) Hoc denique loco eiusdem commentationis editionem imaginibus aliquot illustratam vinculisque retialibus ad opera abs Terentio laudata aliquantum ditatam reppereris.
- 2013: "Colloquia Familiaria: an Aspect of Ciceronianism Reconsidered", in editrice N. van Deusen Cicero Refused to Die: Ciceronian Influence through the Centuries, 2013, pp. 123–139
- 2015 "Conversational Latin to 1650" et "Neo-Latin Prose Style (from Petrarch to c. 1650)" in editoribus P. Ford et al. Brill's Encyclopaedia of the Neo-Latin World

== Sources ==
- Lloyd, Mair (2016). "Living Latin: An Interview with Professor Terence Tunberg". The Journal of Classics Teaching. 17 (34): 44–48. doi:10.1017/S2058631016000234.
- "Terence Tunberg". The Paideia Institute.
- "Index Academiae Sodalium". Academia Latinitati Fovendae.
- Coffee, Neil (2012). "Active Latin: "Quo Tendimus?"". The Classical World. 105 (2): 255–269. doi:10.1353/clw.2012.0007. JSTOR 23264539.
- Neumann O'Neill, Jeanne (1998). "Latinitas Lexintoniae Vivit Valetque". The Classical Outlook. 75 (3): 85–88.
