= Reginald Foster (Latinist) =

American priest and Latinist (1939–2020)

The Reverend Reginald Foster OCD
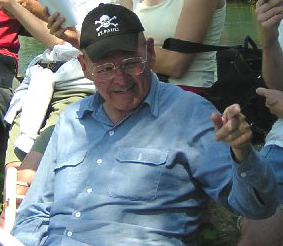
- Born: Reginald Thomas Foster; November 14, 1939; Milwaukee, Wisconsin, U.S.
- Died: December 25, 2020 (aged 81); Milwaukee, Wisconsin, U.S.
- Occupations: Priest, Latinist

Reginald Thomas Foster OCD (November 14, 1939 – December 25, 2020) was an American Catholic priest and friar of the Order of Discalced Carmelites. From 1970 until his retirement in 2009, he worked in the Latin Letters section of the Secretariat of State in the Vatican. He was an expert in Latin literature and an influential teacher of Latin, including 30 years at the Gregorian University, Teresianum and Urbanianum in Rome, and free summer courses that continued when he retired to Milwaukee.

== Life and career ==
Foster grew up in a family of plumbers (his father, brothers, and uncles were plumbers), and entered seminary at 13; he said that he wanted three things: "to be a priest, to be a Carmelite, and to do Latin". At 15, he went to junior seminary in Peterborough, New Hampshire, where he fell in love with Latin; he joined the Carmelites in 1959.

In 1962, Foster went to Rome to study. In 1970, at the recommendation of Carlo Egger and despite the objections of the Procurator General of his Order, he succeeded Monsignor Amleto Tondini in the Latin Letters Office (until Vatican II known as Secretarius Brevium ad Principes or Briefs to Princes), the first American to be one of the Papal Latin secretaries. He worked there for forty years, returning to Milwaukee in 2009 upon his retirement.

Foster lived in Rome in an ascetic manner, sleeping on the floor under a thin blanket, giving away all gifts except books. Instead of wearing the clerical garb, which he believed no longer corresponded to the dress of poor people, he instead donned blue pants and shirts from Sears, with plain black sneakers and a blue polyester windbreaker in cold weather. The Swiss Guards called him il benzinaio (the gas-station attendant), and there were complaints about his appearance.

In addition to his full-time work as a Papal secretary, Foster also served as a priest, tutored students, and had a weekly program on Vatican Radio, The Latin Lover. Starting in 1977, he taught ten Latin courses a year at the Gregorian University in Rome. In 1985, responding to student requests, he added an eight-week summer school with classes meeting seven days a week. The summer school was free; the university fired him in 2006 for allowing too many students to take his classes there without paying. As a result, in November 2006 Foster founded his own free Academia Romae Latinitatis, also known as the Istituto Ganganelli, which as of 2007 was housed at Piazza Venezia in Rome.

In 2008 Foster collapsed in class and had to be hospitalized; he was flown back to the United States, where he received further treatment in a nursing home in Greenfield, Wisconsin, initially on hiatus from his position. He resumed giving free Latin classes at the University of Wisconsin-Milwaukee, and later taught in his nursing home.

Foster died in Milwaukee on December 25, 2020, at the age of 81. He had tested positive for COVID-19.

== Latin ==
Foster was an expert in Latin literature, especially Cicero. He taught Latin as a living language and influenced many Latinists: Nancy Llewellyn was inspired by Foster to found Septentrionale Americanum Latinitatis Vivae Institutum (SALVI), the North American Institute of Living Latin Studies, in 1997. Also, in 2010, two former students, Jason Pedicone and Eric Hewett, revived his summer school in Rome as Living Latin in Rome, a program for college students. They have founded a non-profit organization, the Paideia Institute, which now also sponsors courses in other countries and in Greek, as well as elementary-school programs in the US. Foster headed the effort to produce a modern Latin dictionary, Lexicon Recentis Latinitatis, published 1992–1997. After retiring, he published The Mere Bones of Latin (Ossa Latinitatis Sola) with the Catholic University of America Press in 2016; a second volume was published in 2021, The Bones' Meats Abundant (Ossium Carnes Multae).

Foster was a strict teacher, a "brash curmudgeon" to his students, warning them "if you make one stupid mistake, you're out!"; he sometimes assigned a translation of a bawdy text to a pious sister, and a text from Augustine of Hippo or Pope Leo the Great to an atheist or a Jew. A former student quoted him dismissing theory and warning his students: "I don't care about your garbage literary theory! ... If you don't know what time of day it is, or what your name is, or where you are, don't try Latin because it will smear you on the wall like an oil spot."

Foster's pedagogy was entirely unorthodox. He eschewed the memorization of paradigms—to the point of forbidding students from memorizing lists of grammatical forms and vocabulary; rather, his method consisted of incrementally mastering the structure and vocabulary of the language by breaking down grammar into tiny, discrete concepts that could be immediately grasped and recognized by most students with little additional explanation. Examples included how to say "and" in Latin, or the second-person plural perfect form of a certain class of verbs and its meaning. Then, using chrestomathies of diverse Latin texts compiled by himself, Foster invited students to search for and identify the grammatical form under consideration. In this way, students were exposed, from day one, to genuine Latin literature rather than dry paradigms and tedious, rudimentary constructions. Finally, each lesson was reinforced through protracted homework assignments that often required many hours to complete.

Foster condemned what he saw as a decline in Latin teaching; his effort to revive the language is the subject of a chapter in Alexander Stille's book The Future of the Past, where he is described as "a one-man Audubon Society for the Latin language, determined to save it from extinction." However, he was against returning to the Latin liturgy, saying that it "makes the Vatican look a bit medieval"; Foster instead thought that a better example would be for Benedict XVI to announce that he would read Latin in his Vatican quarters.

== Media reception ==
Foster's position gave him more freedom to speak out than most priests, and he was sought out by journalists. He once responded to a question about Latin as a "sacred language": "In the first century every prostitute in Rome spoke it fluently—and much better than most people in the Roman Curia". The Minnesota Star Tribune quoted him as saying, "I like to say mass in the nude"; however, Foster claimed that he was misquoted. He is one of the subjects of Michael Sheridan's Romans, published in 1995. In 2008, shortly before his retirement, Foster was interviewed outside the Vatican by Bill Maher in the documentary film Religulous, and agreed with statements about the Vatican being "at odds with the message of Jesus", leading to complaints.

== Sources ==
- Walker, Katie (December 25, 2020). "The Pope's Latin teacher". The Oldie.
- Stille, Alexander (2002). The Future of the Past: How the Information Age Threatens to Destroy our Cultural Heritage. New York: Farrar, Straus and Giroux. ISBN 9780374159771.
- Foster, Reginald (December 27, 2008). Latin 'would make Pope speak less'. Today (audio, 6 mins). BBC News.

| Preceded by Antonio Bacci | Papal Latinist; 1969–2009 | Succeeded by Daniel Gallagher |
