= Association for the Reform of Latin Teaching =

The Association for the Reform of Latin Teaching (ARLT) was founded in the United Kingdom in 1913 by the distinguished Classical scholar W. H. D. Rouse. It is now known as the Association for Latin Teaching.

== History ==
=== Origins ===
It arose from Summer Schools which Rouse organised in order to train Latin teachers in the Direct Method of language teaching, which entailed using the language in everyday situations rather than merely learning grammar and syntax by rote. Summer Schools remain the chief activity of this organisation. A journal entitled Latin Teaching reported on the Summer Schools and included articles on practical teaching of Latin. Contributors included Dorothy L. Sayers.

=== After WWII ===
After the Second World War three developments deeply affected the ARLT:

- The Universities of Oxford and Cambridge ceased to require proficiency in Latin as a qualification for entry. This meant a sharp reduction in the numbers of school pupils learning Latin.
- The Cambridge Latin Course brought many of the principles espoused by Rouse and the ARLT into the mainstream of Latin teaching. This led ARLT to adopt a more supportive, rather than campaigning, approach, offering general encouragement for all Classics teachers.
- Three Classical organisations, The Classical Association, the Orbilian Society (now defunct) and the Association for the Reform of Latin Teaching, joined in founding an umbrella organisation: the Joint Association of Classical Teachers (JACT).

ARLT and JACT endured a period of uneasy relations, with some questioning of ARLT's reason for continuing existence, but in time all concerned recognised the need to work together for the common cause against those who willed the demise of Classics teaching. Now the two organisations publish a joint magazine, The Journal of Classics Teaching. ARLT has a website and a blog.

== Political Rumblings ==
During the parliamentary recess in 2021, the Department of Education, fronted by Gavin Williamson announced a £4m scheme to introduce Latin into 40 state schools. Latin is already taught in 3% of stateschools and is permitted under the National Curriculum.

== See also ==
- American Classical League
- Minimus
