= Corporate Art Awards =

The Corporate Art Awards are the international awards for the best art projects developed by the business world. They were launched in Rome (Italy) in 2016 by pptArt under the patronage of the Italian Ministry of Culture and with the support of the General Confederation of Italian Industry and LUISS Business School.

== 2016 edition ==
Under the patronage of the Italian Ministry of Culture, in 2016 pptArt organized the first edition of the Corporate Art Awards, aimed at recognizing the best collaborations between the Corporate World and the Art World. Out of 80 participating companies from 22 countries, the winners were Banca Intesa Sanpaolo and Deutsche Bank for the best corporate collection, American Express for its international restoration program, Shiseido for the oldest corporate collection in Japan and Piaggio for the social media campaign to support its corporate museum.

The 2016 edition of the Corporate Art Awards was also the occasion for the launch of the Corporate Art Manifesto which was signed by the following artists: John David Mooney, Alexander Evgenievich Ponomarev, Ugo Nespolo, Fernando De Filippi, Stefano Pizzi, etc.

== 2017 edition ==
In the 2017 edition, the scope of the Corporate Art Awards was extended to include the Institutional world. The program was then renamed “Mecenati of the XXI century” with the aim to recognize the best art projects supported by institutions and corporations. The winners of the 2017 Institutional Art Awards were: Central Bank of Italy, Italian Ministry of Foreign Affairs, European Investment Bank, Central Bank of Ecuador, European Parliament, UNOG (United Nations Office at Geneva), etc.

The winners of the 2017 Corporate Art Awards were: Intesa Sanpaolo bank as “Patron of the XXI century”, Borsa Italiana, The Absolut Company, Assicurazioni Generali, Ferragamo, Davidoff, Fiat, etc. The 2017 Awards Ceremony was hosted by the President of the Italian Republic Sergio Mattarella at the Quirinal Palace.

== Historical background ==
The following initiatives contributed to the development of the Corporate Art Awards:

- the first Corporate Art exhibit at the Galleria Nazionale d'Arte Moderna in Rome on June 26, 2015. The exhibit presented 78 works of art commissioned by the Corporate World in the last century. Among the Italian artists were Afro Basaldella, Renzo Vespignani, and Giuseppe Santomaso for Esso, Renato Guttuso for Strega, Ugo Nespolo for Piaggio, Leonetto Cappiello for Bacardi Martini, Flavio Favelli for Fabbri. Among the international artists were Romero Britto for Absolut Vodka, Peter Max for American Express, Tom Sachs for Montblanc.
- the Corporate art course at the LUISS Business School
- the creation of the first art crowdsourcing platform with the aim of reintroducing commissioned art through digital innovation
