= Paideia Institute =

Non-profit educational organization

The Paideia Institute
- Founded: 2010
- Founders: Jason Pedicone, Eric Hewett
- Type: Nonprofit educational organization
- Purpose: Classics
- Location(s): New York, NY and Rome, Italy
- Region served: Italy, France, Greece, United States
- Website: www.paideiainstitute.org

The Paideia Institute for Humanistic Study is a non-profit educational organization that promotes the study and appreciation of classical languages. It is headquartered in New York, NY.

== History ==
The Paideia Institute was founded in 2010 by Jason Pedicone and Eric Hewett. Pedicone and Hewett were former students of Fr. Reginald Foster, a longtime Vatican Latinist who taught generations of classicists in Rome. The Institute has headquarters in New York City and Rome and runs travel programs for students of the classical humanities in Italy, Greece, France, and the United States. In keeping with Fr. Foster’s immersive approach to teaching Latin, Paideia courses emphasize the active use of Latin and ancient Greek as living spoken languages.

In 2015, Paideia won the Society for Classical Studies' President's Award for its "work in significantly advancing public appreciation and awareness of classical antiquity."

== Travel programs ==
The Paideia Institute’s flagship two-week summer Latin and ancient Greek courses pair the immersive study of ancient texts with visits to the landmarks of the ancient, medieval, and Renaissance Latin- and Greek-speaking worlds. The Institute also offers a winter travel course focused on medieval Latin and set in Paris, as well as an annual ancient language pedagogy conference in New York City.

== Online programs ==
Since the COVID-19 pandemic, the Institute has expanded its online “Telepaideia” course offerings, which include introductory Latin and ancient Greek intensives, reading seminars, and surveys of ancient history and mythology.

== Classical tours ==
The Paideia Institute operates a Classical Tours service that provides planning and logistical support for high school and college study abroad travel experiences. Paideia Classical Tours are staffed by recent graduates and graduate students in the classical humanities who receive training as teaching assistants through the Institute’s year-long Rome Fellowship.

== Publications ==
The Paideia Institute has published several Latin and ancient Greek curricula, including the Elementa Latin curriculum for middle and elementary school students, the Dolphin Editions commentaries on Virgil’s Aeneid, Caesar’s Gallic Wars, and Homer’s Iliad, and the Living Latin self-paced online Latin course. The Paideia Institute Press independently publishes scholarly and pedagogical books related to the study of ancient languages.

In 2017, the Paideia Institute launched an online humanities magazine "for lovers of the Classics" called In Medias Res. The magazine covers classical literature, language, and culture.

== Outreach ==
As part of the institute’s mission to expand access to the study of the classical humanities, the Paideia Institute created the Teaching Literacy with Latin (formerly called “Aequora”) outreach program to improve literacy outcomes in elementary and middle schools across the US. The program operates as a volunteer-based after-school extracurricular in which students learn the basics of Latin through games and hands-on activities. The Paideia Institute also offers several scholarships to all of its travel programs, including the Greece and Rome prizes for outstanding high school students with financial need.

== Diversity and inclusion ==
In 2019, the Paideia Institute was publicly criticized by students and staff who found fault with the culture and working environment at the Institute and called for more diversity, more gender equity in Institute leadership positions, and more robust HR practices. These events caused several of the institute’s partner institutions to suspend their partnerships with the Institute, including the Society for Classical Studies.

In response, the Institute’s Board and leadership conducted an internal investigation into the allegations and the Institute’s working environment and culture more generally. The investigation found no evidence of misconduct on the part of Institute leadership, but did note several cultural issues that it felt needed to be addressed to foster a more diverse and inclusive environment. On the recommendations of a consultant, the Institute made a number of changes to its personnel, management structure, and policies and procedures.

At the conclusion of the investigation, the Institute’s president published a statement apologizing on behalf of the institute to those who felt excluded or disrespected at Paideia in the past. In 2021, the Society for Classical Studies reinstated the Institute as an organization in good standing.

== See also ==
- Anthony Grafton
- Society for Classical Studies
