= Meissner's Latin Phrasebook =

Meissner's Latin Phrase-book is a book of phrases in Latin for students of composition or those wanting to learn spoken Latin.

== History of the English text ==
The English text is a translation of Carl Meissner's (1830–1900) sixth German edition. (Meissner was also the author of a study of Terence and should not be confused with the Swiss botanist of the same name). It was first translated into English by H. W. Auden, who added more phrases. The book then went through multiple reprints and editions during the twentieth century and is still being used and cited as a source.

== Most recent editions ==
- Latin Phrasebook, C. Meissner and H. W. Auden, Hippocrene (1998) ISBN 0-7818-0666-6
- Latin Phrase Book, C. Meissner, Duckworth (1981) ISBN 0-7156-1469-X
