= Latin interjections =

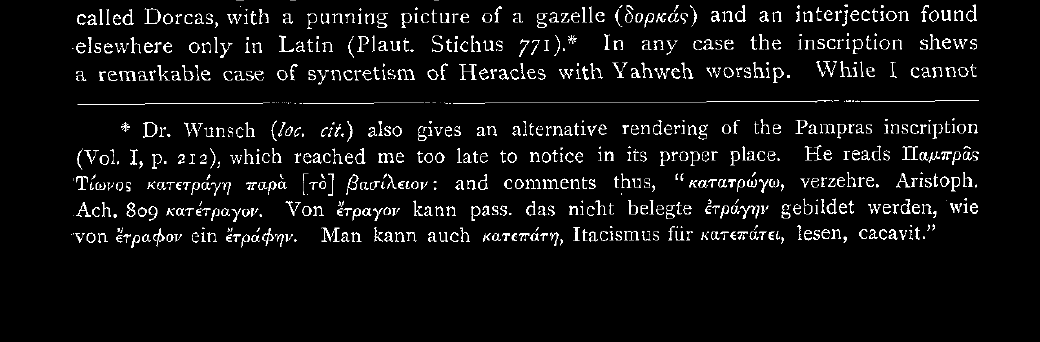

There are many interjections in the Latin language, though by their nature they are not often found in the formal register of written Classical Latin, being mostly attested in certain comedies, by playwrights such as Terence and Plautus, which are written in a style more similar to Vulgar Latin. Terms used to express surprise or attract attention include "heu!" or "eheu!" (alas!), more commonly "vae!" with the same meaning, "euge!" (hurrah!) and "amen!" (truly, let it be) borrowed from the Hebrew. Invocations of the lower gods are plenty; most commonly "Pol!" (by Pollux!) and "mehercle!" (my Hercules!) while the names of higher deities are less common. Another interjection, "Vah!" Which simply means "Hah!"
