= Latin word order =

Sentence structure

Latin word order is relatively free. The subject, object, and verb can come in any order, and an adjective can go before or after its noun, as can a genitive such as hostium "of the enemies". A common feature of Latin is hyperbaton, in which a phrase is split up by other words: Sextus est Tarquinius "it is Sextus Tarquinius".

A complicating factor in Latin word order is that there are variations in the style of different authors and between different genres of writing. In Caesar's historical writing, the verb is much likelier to come at the end of the sentence than in Cicero's philosophy. The word order of poetry is even freer than in prose, and examples of interleaved word order (double hyperbaton) are common.

In terms of word order typology, Latin is classified by some scholars as basically an SOV (subject-object-verb) language, with preposition-noun, noun-genitive, and adjective-noun (but also noun-adjective) order. Other scholars, however, argue that the word order of Latin is so variable that it is impossible to establish one order as more basic than another.

Although the order of words in Latin is comparatively free, it is not arbitrary. Frequently, different orders indicate different nuances of meaning and emphasis. As Devine and Stephens, the authors of Latin Word Order, put it: "Word order is not a subject which anyone reading Latin can afford to ignore. . . . Reading a paragraph of Latin without attention to word order entails losing access to a whole dimension of meaning."

== Influence on meaning ==
Studying word order in Latin helps the reader to understand the author's meaning more clearly. For example, when a verb is placed at the beginning of a sentence, it sometimes indicates a sudden action: so complōsit Trimalchio manūs means not just "Trimalchio clapped his hands" but "Trimalchio suddenly clapped his hands". In another sentence, the initial verb functions as a topic: dēcessit Corellius Rūfus does not mean merely "Corellius Rufus has died" but rather "The person who has died is Corellius Rufus." In other examples, the initial verb is emphatic: vīdī forum "with my own eyes, I saw the forum".

The placement of adjectives also affects the emphasis. So the phrase mea fāma, with the possessive before the noun, in the introduction to Livy's history means not "my fame" but "my own fame," contrasting with other people's fame. In the sentence nāvēs sunt combustae quīnque from Caesar, with the number at the end of the sentence and separated from its noun, does not mean only "five ships were burnt" but "no fewer than five ships were burnt."

The use of hyperbaton (separation of words that normally go together) is also common in Latin. Thus, Caesar's hae permānsērunt aquae diēs complūrēs, with hae "these" separated from aquae "flood waters", means not "These floods remained for several days" but "This time, the flood waters (unlike the previous ones) remained for several days."

== Theoretical approaches ==
In the past 100 years, especially since the advent of computerised texts, Latin word order has been extensively studied with a view to elucidating the principles on which it is based. Two major recent works on Latin word order, based on different approaches, are those of Devine and Stephens (2006) and Olga Spevak (2010).

It is generally agreed that pragmatic factors such as topic and focus, contrast, emphasis, and heaviness play a major role in Latin word order. The topic (what is being talked about) is often at the beginning of the sentence, with the focus (what is said about the topic) being at the end or in the penultimate position.

Other factors that play a role in word order are semantic (for example, adjectives of size usually precede the noun, and those of material more often follow it). In some Latin authors, consideration of such matters as euphony, assonance, and rhythm is also important.

One major area of disagreement is how far syntax plays a role in word order. According to Devine and Stephens (2006), Latin has a basic neutral word order, which they state is as follows:

- Subject – Direct Object – Indirect Object / Oblique Argument – Adjunct – Goal or Source – Non-Referential Direct Object – Verb

A "non-referential object" goes closely with the verb and makes a phrase with it, like impetum in the phrase impetum facere "to make an attack".

For example, the following would be considered examples of "neutral" word order:

Germānī ... in hostēs impetum fēcērunt (Caesar)
"The Germans made an attack on the enemy"

Pharasmānēs ... magnās cōpiās fīliō trādidit (Tacitus)
"Pharasmanes handed over a large army to his son"

Thermus cohortēs ex urbe redūcit (Caesar)
"Thermus led the cohorts back from out of the city"

mulierem venēnō interfēcit (Cicero)
"he killed the woman with poison (venēnō)"

scrībās suōs ānulīs aureīs in cōntiōne dōnārunt (Cicero)
"they presented their scribes with golden rings (ānulīs) in the assembly"

Following the theories of generative grammar, Devine and Stephens assume that deviations from that basic unmarked order are made to put emphasis on different elements. They use the term "scrambling" if constituents come in a different order from the basic one, and they assume that scrambling occurs when an element is moved leftwards, towards the beginning of the sentence. Leftwards movement is called "raising".

Olga Spevak (2010), on the other hand, basing her work on theories of functional grammar, rejects that approach. She considers that there are so many deviations from the so-called neutral order between authors and even in the works of the same author that it is not possible to discover what the neutral order must be. Therefore, an approach insisting on a basic unmarked order "does not really help a Latinist to better understand Latin constituent order." She stresses that according to the principles of functional grammar, as outlined by the Dutch linguist Simon Dik, words take their positions in a sentence according to a certain template, not by being moved from elsewhere.

Harm Pinkster (1990a) also favours a pragmatic approach and writes: "there is no reason for assuming a SOV order in Classical Latin, nor is there one for assuming a SVO order by AD 400".

However, not all scholars are ready to dismiss syntactic factors entirely. J.G.F. Powell, in his review of Spevak's book, commented that "nobody has yet succeeded in unifying the insights of all the different scholarly approaches to the fascinating and peculiar problem of Latin word order". In his view, an approach that combines the various schools of thought on Latin word order "may succeed in finding a more satisfactory solution".

== Topic and focus ==
Several recent books, such as those of Panhuis and Spevak, have analysed Latin sentences from a pragmatic point of view. Syntactic approaches traditionally analyse a sentence into Subject and Predicate, but a pragmatic analysis considers a sentence from the point of view of Topic and Focus (or Theme and Rheme, as Panhuis (1982) puts it). This type of approach was also proposed by Sturtevant (1909), who referred to the topic as the "psychological subject".

As with Subject, Object and Verb, Topic and Focus can be arranged in different ways in a sentence.

=== Topic ===
==== Types of topic ====
The topic is the thing or person that is being talked about in the sentence. Spevak (2010) distinguishes various kinds of topic: discourse topic, sentence topic, sub-topic, future topic, theme, and so on. A sentence topic is one that picks up the immediately preceding context (e.g. ad ea below) and has precedence over the discourse topic (Caesar below):

ad ea Caesar respondit...
"To this Caesar replied..."

A topic will often take precedence over a conjunction, and the following word order where the topic (in this case the grammatical subject) precedes cum "when" is fairly common:

Tūberō, cum in Āfricam vēnisset, invēnit in prōvinciā cum imperiō Attium Vārum.
"As for Tubero, when he reached Africa, he found Attius Varus in the province with military command."

==== Topicless sentences ====
Not every sentence has a topic, but some present information which is entirely new. Pinkster gives the following as an example:

erant omnīnō itinera duo.
"There were two roads in all."

Such sentences are sometimes called "presentative sentences" and often start with a verb.

=== Focus ===
The focus is the new information, i.e. the message which is being conveyed to the listener.

==== Final focus ====
Often in Latin the topic comes first, and then the focus. For example, in the sentence below, the topic is "in the bathhouse" (balneārea), which has been previously mentioned, and the sub-topic is the hot-room (assa) (since it can be assumed that all bath-houses have a hot room); the new information is that Cicero has moved the hot room, and the place to which he has moved it:

in balneāriīs assa in alterum apodȳtērī angulum prōmōvī.
"In the bath-house the hot room I have moved into the other corner of the changing-room."

Similarly, in the following example, the new information is the sumptuousness of the funerals in question:

fūnera sunt ... magnifica et sūmptuōsa.
"Their funerals are magnificent and expensive."

In the following example, where the adverb celeriter "quickly" is placed early in the sentence, the main information is the action "took up arms"; the speed is subsidiary information (Devine and Stephens use the terms "nuclear focus" and "weak focus" for this):

nostrī celeriter arma cēpērunt.
"Our men quickly took up arms."

Often the verb can be part of the topic, as in the following example. The new information, or focus, is the person who followed and the number of ships he brought:

hunc secūtus Mārcius Rūfus quaestor nāvibus duodecim.
"Following him came the quaestor Marcius Rufus with twelve ships."

==== Penultimate focus ====
A very frequent place for the focus, however, is in penultimate position, just before the verb or another element. In the example below, Alba has been mentioned in the previous sentence, and the fact that cities have rulers can be assumed; the new information or focus is the name of the ruler at that time, Gaius Cluilius. In this sentence, as in the previous example, the verb itself acts as a topic:

imperitābat tum Gāius Cluilius Albae.
"The ruler of Alba at that time was Gaius Cluilius."

When an unemphatic argument, neither focus nor topic, such as Albae above, follows the focussed word in this way, it is known as a "tail".

In the following example the fact that northerly regions have winters is already known, and the new information is the fact that they come early:

in hīs locīs ... mātūrae sunt hiemēs.
"In this region, winters (hiemēs) are early"

In the following, the fire has already been mentioned; the new information is that it continued day and night, with the main emphasis on the fact that it was continuous:

nocte ac diē continuātum incendium fuit.
"The blaze was continuous by night and day."

In the following, the fact that the road has been measured can be assumed (Cicero has just mentioned the measurement); the new information is that he measured it himself:

sum enim ipse mēnsus.
"For I measured it myself."

Similarly in the following, the fact that orders were given has already been mentioned, and the fact that they were carried out can be assumed; the new information is that they were carried out quickly:

illī imperāta celeriter fēcērunt.
"They carried out his instructions quickly."

In the following, the sentence answers the unspoken question "What did the general do with all the money he found in the captured city?", the answer being "He sent it to Rome" (with "Rome" being the most important word):

omnem pecūniam Rōmam mīsit.
"He sent all the money to Rome."

==== Initial focus ====
Occasionally, the focus can be given extra emphasis by being placed before the topic. In the following pair of sentences, the focus of one is at the beginning, and of the other at the end:

Samia mihī māter fuit; ea habitābat Rhodī.
"My mother was Samian; (but at that time) she was living in Rhodes."

In the sentence below from Livy, the sentence topic ("that year") and discourse topic ("the war") are in the middle of the sentence. The fact that war was waged on both land and sea is a weak focus placed in penultimate position; but the new and surprising information is that the number of Roman legions was no fewer than 23, and this comes at the beginning of the sentence before the topic:

tribus et vīgintī legiōnibus Rōmānīs eō annō bellum terrā marīque est gestum.
"That year war was waged on land and sea with (no fewer than) 23 Roman legions."

=== Emphatic topics ===
In the following sentence with antithesis, two topics, "the land journey" and "the journey by sea", are contrasted. Because they are contrasted, the topics are more emphatic than the focus:

breve terrā iter eō, brevis nāvigātiō ab Naupactō est.
"The journey there by land is short, and the sea journey from Naupactus is also short."

Similar is the following, where the contrasted topics are "when I was a young man" and "now that I am an old one":

dēfendī rem pūblicam adulēscēns, nōn dēseram senex.
"I defended the republic as a young man, I shall not desert her as an old one."

Devine and Stephens refer to such emphatic topics used contrastively as "co-focus".

Another example is the following, where the phrase "this place" (namely the city of Laurentum which was mentioned in the previous sentence) is in the emphatic penultimate position, as though it were the focus:

Troia et huic locō nōmen est.
"The name Troy is also give to this place."

No recordings exist of Latin from the classical period, but it can be assumed that differences in emphasis in Latin were shown by intonation as well as by word order.

== Euphony and rhythm ==
Euphony and rhythm undoubtedly played a large part in Roman writers' choice of word order, especially in oratory, but also in historians such as Livy. Statements from the writers themselves make it clear that the important consideration was the clausula or rhythm of the final few syllables of each clause.

Cicero himself, commenting on a speech of the tribune Gaius Carbo, quotes the sentence below, which apparently caused the audience to burst into shouts of approval:

patris dictum sapiēns temeritās fīlī comprobāvit.
"The wise words of the father have been proved by the rash behaviour of his son."

He notes that the sentence would be ruined rhythmically if the word order of the last three words were changed to comprobāvit fīlī temeritās. What was apparently admired here was the clausula of comprobāvit with its double trochaic – u – – rhythm; whereas temeritās would make a rhythm of u u u –, which Cicero says would produce an unsatisfying effect in Latin, despite being recommended by Aristotle.

In another passage from the same work, Cicero criticises a sentence from the orator Crassus on the grounds that it sounds like a line of iambic poetry. To avoid this, he says it would be better if the sentence ended prōdeant ipsī (– u – – –) rather than ipsī prōdeant (– – – u –).

The 1st-century A.D. teacher of oratory, Quintilian, remarks that hyperbaton (switching words round) is often used to make a sentence more euphonious. He gives the example of the following sentence from the opening of Cicero's prō Cluentiō:

animadvertī, iūdicēs, omnem accūsātōris ōrātiōnem in duās dīvīsam esse partīs.
"I noticed, judges, that accuser's speech is divided into two parts (duās partīs)."

Quintilian says that in duās partīs dīvīsam esse would be correct, but "harsh and inelegant".

In another place he says that to end a sentence with the verb is best, because the verb is the most forceful part of the sentence (in verbīs enim sermōnis vīs est); but if putting a verb finally is rhythmically harsh, the verb is frequently moved.

Another example where euphonic considerations may have played a part in word order is the following, from a letter by Pliny the Younger:

magnum prōventum poētārum annus hic attulit.
"It is a big crop of poets this year has brought."

Since hic was pronounced hicc, the unusual order with the demonstrative following the noun produces a favourite double cretic clausula (– u – – u –). There is also a pleasing assonance of the vowels a-u-i a-u-i in the last three words.

== Individual style ==
Another factor affecting word order was the individual style of different authors. Devine and Stephens note for example that Livy is fond of putting the object after the verb at the end of the clause (e.g. posuit castra "he placed a camp", rather than castra posuit, which Caesar preferred).

Other differences between authors have been observed. For example, Caesar frequently places a number after a noun (in about 46% of cases), but this is rarer in Cicero (only 10% of cases).

== Verb position ==
Several scholars have examined Latin sentences from a syntactic point of view, in particular the position of the verb.

=== Final verb ===
In sentences with Subject, Object, and Verb, any order is possible. However, some orders are more common than others. In a sample of 568 sentences of Caesar containing all three elements examined by Pinkster, the proportions were:

- SOV : 63%
- OSV : 21%
- OVS : 6%
- VOS : 5%
- SVO : 4%
- VSO : 1%

An example of the typical Subject-Object-Verb (SOV) word order in Caesar is:

Caesar suās cōpiās in proximum collem subdūcit.
"Caesar withdrew his forces to the nearest hill."

A dependent infinitive, such as interficī "to be killed" below, also in Caesar usually precedes its verb:

magnam partem eōrum interficī iussit.
"He ordered the majority of them to be killed."

However, in other genres of Latin, especially more colloquial types such as the comic dialogues of Plautus, Cicero's letters, or Petronius's satiric novel, the final position for the verb is much less common. Marouzeau comments: "In certain texts the medial position of the verb seems more normal than the final."

Linde (1923) counted the verb final clauses in various texts and produced the following figures for clauses with verbs in the final position:

Author	Main clauses	Subordinate clauses
Caesar (book 2)	84%	93%
Sallust (ch. 1–36)	75%	87%
Cato (ch. 1–27)	70%	86%
Tacitus (ch. 1–37)	64%	86%
Livy (30.30–45)	63%	79%
Seneca (letters 1–9)	58%	66%
Cicero (dē Inventiōne 1–22)	50%	68%
Cicero (dē Rē Pūblicā 1–32)	35%	61%

In all authors, the verb tends to be final more often in subordinate clauses than in main clauses.

Over the centuries, verb-final main clauses became less common. In the writing of Egeria (Aetheria) of about A.D. 380, only 25% of main clauses and 37% of subordinate clauses are verb-final.

The verb sum "I am" (or its parts) is an exception to the rule that verbs tend to come at the end of the sentence in Caesar and Cicero. According to one investigation, in Caesar, when the verb is sum, only 10% of main clauses end with the verb. With other verbs, the figure is 90%.

In Cicero the verb sum is used at the end of a sentence slightly more often, in 20%–35% of main clauses. However, this is less than with other verbs, for which the figure is 55%–70%.

The above figures apply to sentences where sum is used as in independent verb (e.g. difficile est "it is difficult"), rather than as an auxiliary to another verb (e.g. profectus est "he set out"), when it frequently ends the clause.

Different authors have different preferences. In Sallust, who has a rather conservative style, the verb sum (except where existential) tends to go at the end of the sentence. Cato also usually puts the verb sum finally, except in specificational and identity sentences, such as the following:

haec erunt vīlicī officia.
"The following will be the duties of the farm-manager."

=== Penultimate verb ===
Quite commonly, especially in certain authors such as Nepos and Livy, the verb can come in penultimate position, followed by the object, as in this example:

Popilius virgā quam in manū gerēbat circumscrīpsit rēgem. (Livy)
"Popilius with a stick which he was holding in his hand drew a circle round the king."

This stylistic feature, consisting of Verb + Object at the end of a clause, is referred to by Devine and Stephens as "V-bar syntax". It is much less common in Caesar than in Livy. In Caesar the phrase castra posuit/pōnit "placed a camp" always comes in that order, but in Livy it is found as posuit castra in 45 out of 55 examples (82%).

Even in Caesar, however, a locative phrase may occasionally follow a verb of motion, especially when the locative is focussed:

Pompēius ... Lūceriā proficīscitur Canusium.
"Pompey from Luceria departed for Canusium."

Other prepositional phrases can also sometimes follow the verb:

eo proficīscitur cum legiōnibus.
"He set off for that place with the legions."

Other types of phrases which can sometimes follow a verb are relative clauses:

eadem cōgitāns quae ante sēnserat.
"Thinking the same as he had felt before."

Dependent clauses with ut almost always follow the verb:

Ubiīs imperat ut pecora dēdūcant.
"He orders the Ubii to bring in their cattle."

Another kind of situation where the verb commonly comes in penultimate position is when it is followed by a strongly focussed negative pronoun such as nemo "no one" or quisquam "anyone":

quod ante id tempus accidit nūllī.
"Which had never happened to anyone before."

ēmptor ... inventus est nēmō.
"No buyer at all was found."

The grammatical subject can come after the verb in sentences of the following kind where it is focussed, and the verb itself forms part of the topic:

Āfricam initiō habuēre Gaetūlī et Libyes.
"The original inhabitants of Africa were the Gaetulians and Libyans."

Similarly in sentences such as the following, it is reasonable to suppose that the object is focussed:

nōs prōvinciae praefēcimus Caelium.
"The person I have put in charge of the province is Caelius."

This type of sentence where the focus is on the object at the end should be distinguished from sentences with V-bar syntax such as circumscrīpsit rēgem "he drew a circle round the king" mentioned above, in which the object is not focussed.

=== Initial verb ===
==== Sudden actions ====
Initial verbs are often used in sentences such as the following, which describe a sudden or immediate consequence of a previous event:

profugiunt statim ex urbe tribūnī plēbis.
"The tribunes immediately fled the city."

videt imminēre hostēs ... capit arma ā proximīs ...
"He sees the enemy threatening ... he immediately seizes weapons from those next to him ..."

dum titulōs perlegimus, complōsit Trimalchiō manūs.
"While we were reading the labels carefully, Trimalchio suddenly clapped his hands."

conclāmat vir paterque!
"There was an immediate shout from husband and father!"

Such sentences are of a type known as "thetic" sentences, which answer "What happened?" rather than "What did the subject do?" Frequently they are in the historic present tense (in Caesar the historic present is six times as common in verb-initial sentences as the perfect tense).

Sometimes, even if the verb does not come at the beginning of the sentence, the suddenness of the action can be shown by placing it earlier in its clause. Thus the final words of this sentence, which would normally be dē locō superiōre impetum faciunt "they make an attack from higher ground", are changed to faciunt dē locō superiōre impetum to emphasise the element of surprise:

statim complūres cum tēlīs in hunc faciunt dē locō superiōre impetum.
"Immediately several people with weapons make a (sudden) attack on him (my client) from higher ground."

==== Agentless verbs ====
The agent of the verb in thetic sentences tends to be less important than the verb; consequently, verb-initial sentences often have a verb in the passive voice. In Caesar, the passive verb mittitur ("is sent") is much commoner sentence-initially than mittit ("he sends"):

dēfertur ea rēs ad Caesarem.
"The matter was reported to Caesar."

pugnātum est ab utrīsque ācriter.
"There was fierce fighting on both sides."

ītur in antīquam silvam.
"They entered an ancient forest."

Intransitive verbs of the type called unaccusative verbs, that is, verbs which have no voluntary agent, such as maneō "remain", crēscō "grow", stō "stand", pateō "be open", mānō "flow or spread", also often begin thetic sentences:

mānat tōtā urbe rūmor.
"A rumour spread all over the city."

fit magna caedēs.
"A great slaughter took place."

==== Situations ====
Thetic sentences with initial verb can also be explanatory or give background information:

mīserat enim Pharnacēs corōnam auream.
"For Pharnaces had sent a golden crown."

crēscēbat interim urbs.
"Meanwhile the city was growing."

dēsponderat fīliam L. Icilio tribūnīciō, virō ācrī...
"(The situation was that) he had betrothed his daughter to the former tribune Lucius Icilius, an active man..."

==== Presentational verbs ====
Presentational verbs (e.g. erat "there was") are also usually sentence-initial:

erat ā septentriōnibus collis.
"There was a hill on the north side."

vēnerat ad eum ... Laetilius quīdam.
"There had come to him a certain Laetilius."

relinquebātur ūna per Sēquanōs via.
"There remained one other line of route, through the Sequani"

The kind of verbs that typically present new information in this way are such verbs as "there was", "there occurred", "there came".

==== Emphatic verb ====
A verb at the beginning of the sentence is often emphatic, perhaps expressing something surprising:

laudat Āfricānum Panaetius...; quidnī laudet?
"Panaetius praises Africanus...; why should he not praise him?"

Another situation favouring initial verb position is where the verb is in contrastive focus (antithesis), as in the following:

excīsa est enim arbor, non ēvulsa.
"For the tree was cut down, not uprooted."

The verbs also come initially in sentences like the one below, in which there is a double antithesis. These are examples of sentences with initial focus (see above):

contempsistī L. Mūrēnae genus, extulistī tuum.
"You scorned Lucius Murena's family and you exalted your own."

Another reason for using a sentence-initial verb is when the speaker is emphatically asserting the truth of a fact:

num negāre audēs? ... fuistī igitur apud Laecam illā nocte, Catilīna!
"Do you dare deny it? ... You were therefore at Laeca's house that night, Catiline!"

erit, erit illud profectõ tempus.
"It will come, that time will certainly come."

vīdī, simul cum populō Rōmānō, forum comitiumque adōrnātum....
"(With my own eyes) I saw, together with the Roman people, the forum and comitium adorned..."

est enim sine dubiō domus iūris cōnsultī totīus ōrāculum cīvitātis.
"For without doubt, the house of a legal expert is (like) an oracle of the whole city."

Verbs with meanings such as "move", "offend", "make anxious" etc., known as "psych" verbs, also often come sentence-initially. In Livy, the verb mōvit ("moved") frequently (although not always) comes first if it is used in the metaphorical sense:

mōvit aliquantum ōrātiō rēgis lēgātōs.
"The king's speech persuaded the ambassadors to a certain extent."

But when the sense is literal, it always come finally:

castra ab Thermopylīs ad Hērāclēam mōvit.
"He moved camp from Thermopylae to Heraclea."

==== Verb as topic ====
Another reason for putting the verb first is that it represents the topic of the sentence, while the grammatical subject which follows it is the focus. For example, after mentioning that he has been upset by the death of someone, Pliny goes on to say:

dēcessit Corellius Rūfus.
"The person who died was Corellius Rufus."

Other examples of this are given above in the section on topic and focus.

==== Questions and imperatives ====
An initial verb can also be used (without emphasis) in yes–no questions:

estne frāter intus?
"Is my brother inside?"

Imperatives also often (but not always) come at the beginning of a sentence:

dā mī bāsia mīlle, deinde centum!
"Give me a thousand kisses, then a hundred!"

=== The verb "to be" ===
The verb sum ("I am") can be used as an auxiliary verb (e.g. interfectus est "he was killed"), as a copula (e.g. dīves erat "he was rich") or as an existential verb, specifying the existence of something.

==== Existential ====
As an existential verb, est (or its past tense erat) often goes at the beginning of the sentence. These sentences are also called "presentative" sentences, that is, sentences which serve to introduce new entities into the discourse.

erat ā septentriōnibus collis.
"On the north side, there was a hill."

erat vallis inter duās aciēs.
"There was a valley between the two armies."

Of these two orders, the first (with the locative phrase between the verb and the noun) is by far the most common. The second example above is unusual in that it does not present new information but merely reminds the reader of what has already been said ("There was a valley, as mentioned above...").

In other sentences, the verb est or erat follows the word which it is presenting, or comes in the middle of a phrase in hyperbaton:

flūmen est Arar, quod ... in Rhodanum īnfluit.
"There is a river called the Arar, which flows into the Rhone."

in eō flūmine pōns erat.
"On that river there was a bridge."

palūs erat non magna inter nostrum atque hostium exercitum.
"There was a marsh, not particularly large, between our army and the enemies' one."

apud eōs magnae sunt ferrāriae.
"In their country there are large iron-mines."

==== Location ====
The verb est can also specify the location of a thing or person and can equally come at the beginning or end of the sentence:

erat eō tempore Antōnius Brundisiī.
"At that time, Antony was in Brundisium." (Focus on Antonius)

nunc ipse Bruttius Rōmae mēcum est.
"Bruttius himself is at present with me in Rome." (Focus on Rōmae mēcum)

==== Copula ====
When est is a copula, it tends to be unemphatic and to be placed after a stronger word, or between two strong words:

hōrum omnium fortissimī sunt Belgae
"Of all these the most warlike are the Belgae."

cuius pater Caesaris erat lēgātus
"whose father was a legate of Caesar"

This strong word which est follows can also be the subject:

Gallia est omnis dīvīsa in partīs trīs.
"Gaul, considered as a whole, is divided into three parts."

It is also possible for the subject to follow the copula:

plēna erant omnia timōris et lūctūs.
"Everything was full of fear and mourning."

Or the order may be Adjective, Subject, Copula:

quamquam rēgī īnfesta plēbēs erat.
"Although the common people were hostile to the king."

When the sentence is negative, however, the verb est tends to follow nōn and is often clause-final:

id autem difficile nōn est.
"Moreover, this isn't difficult."

==== Auxiliary ====
When est is an auxiliary, it normally follows the participle which it is used with:

in summō ōtiō rediēns ā cēnā Rōmae occīsus est.
"In the middle of peace-time, he was killed in Rome while returning from dinner."

statim Rōmam profectus est.
"He immediately departed for Rome."

Sometimes, however, the auxiliary can be placed earlier to follow some significant item of information, such as a quantity phrase or focussed word:

magnusque eōrum numerus est occīsus.
"and a large number of them were killed."

inde Quīnctius Corinthum est profectus.
"From there Quinctius departed for Corinth."

maximā sum laetitiā adfectus, cum audīvī cōnsulem tē factum esse.
"I was overcome with greatest joy when I heard that you had been made consul"

(In the same way, in the above example, the word consulem is emphasised by placing the unemphatic word tē after it.)

In subordinate clauses the auxiliary is frequently placed directly after the conjunction or relative pronoun:

eōdem unde erant profectae.
"to that same place from where they had set out"

But if there is a focus word following the conjunction or relative pronoun, the auxiliary follows that:

quae ad ancorās erant dēligātae.
"which had been tied to anchors"

In a negative sentence, the auxiliary tends to follow the word nōn. Nōn est can either precede or follow the participle:

quā perfectum opus nōn erat.
"where the work had not been completed".

conloquendī Caesarī causa vīsa nōn est.
"There didn't seem to Caesar to be any reason for parlaying."

Pollicem, sī adhūc nōn est profectus, quam prīmum fac extrūdās.
"If Pollux still hasn't departed, set him on his way as soon as you can."

For "he did not dare", Latin writers use all three orders: nōn est ausus, ausus nōn est, nōn ausus est, but the first of these is the most common:

Clōdius in campum īre nōn est ausus.
"Clodius did not dare go into the election ground."

== Adjective position ==
In Latin, an adjective can either precede or follow its noun: for example, "a good man" can be both bonus vir or vir bonus. Some kinds of adjectives are more inclined to follow the noun, others to precede, but "the precise factors conditioning the variation are not immediately obvious".

In Caesar and Cicero, it has been found that the majority (60%–80%) of ordinary adjectives, not counting pronominals and numerals, precede their nouns.

=== Factors affecting adjective position ===
==== Semantic ====
One factor affecting the order is semantic. As a general rule, adjectives which express an inherent property of the noun, such as "gold" in "gold ring", tend to follow it. Where the adjective is more salient or important than the noun, as "Appian" in "Appian Way" (via Appia), it also tends to follow it.

Adjectives which express a subjective evaluation, such as gravis "serious", on the other hand, usually go before the noun. Adjectives of size and quantity also usually precede (in 91% of examples in Caesar, 83% in Cicero), as do demonstrative adjectives such as hic "this" and ille "that" (99% in Caesar, 95% in Cicero).

Adjectives where there is a choice between two alternatives, such as "left" or "right", or "preceding" and "following", also tend to go before the noun. However, the opposite order (e.g. manū sinistrā "with left hand", Catullus 12) is also found.

==== Contrast and focus ====
Other factors such as focus and contrast may also affect the order. When there is contrastive focus the adjective will precede, even if it is one such as a geographical name which normally follows:

utrum bonus vir est an malus?
"Is he a good man or a bad one?"

ūnus in Faliscō, alter in Vāticānō agrō.
"One in the Faliscan and the other in Vatican territory."

Even when the contrast is not explicit, a strong focus may cause the adjective to come first:

Aurēliā viā profectus est.
"It is the Aurelian Way that he has set out on (not any other)."

On the other hand, an adjective which normally precedes, such as a number, can follow the noun when it is focussed or emphasised:

nāvēs sunt combustae quīnque
"No fewer than five ships were burnt out."

Contrast the following, where the emphasis is on triremes:

praetereā duae sunt dēpressae trirēmēs.
"In addition, two triremes were also sunk."

A descriptive relative clause can be brought forward in the same way as an adjective. In the following sentence, Caesar says the Gauls outside the defences were in confusion, and those inside the defences equally so. The antithesis puts emphasis on the underlined phrase:

nōn minus quī intrā mūnītiōnēs erant perturbantur Gallī
'those of the Gauls who were inside the defences were also thrown into confusion'

==== Diachronic change ====
Over time the position of adjectives can be seen changing, for example, between Cato the Elder (2nd century BC) and Columella (1st century AD). Adjectives describing the type of something, such as ligneus "wooden", oleārius "designed for oil" or novus "new" always follow the noun in Cato, but can come either before or after in Columella.

In Cato, the adjective magnus "big" follows its noun in 7 out of 9 examples, e.g. tempestātēs magnās "big storms", but in Caesar about 95% of examples go before the noun.

Livy uses this antique word order at a dramatic moment in his history when he reports the words of the magistrate announcing the news of the disaster at the battle of Lake Trasimene in 217 BC:

tandem haud multō ante sōlis occāsum M. Pompōnius praetor "pugnā" inquit "magnā victī sumus".
"At last not long before sunset, Marcus Pomponius the praetor announced: 'We have been defeated in a great battle'."

Another adjective which changes over time is omnis "all". In Cato this word goes before or after the noun with equal frequency, but in Cicero's speeches 80% of the time it precedes, and in Caesar it goes before the noun even more commonly.

==== Stylistic preferences ====
As with other aspects of word order, stylistic preferences also play a part in adjective order. For example, the adjective superior in its literal sense of "higher" (e.g. ex locō superiōre "from a higher place") usually comes after the noun in Cicero and in Caesar, but in Livy the position before the noun (ex superiōre locō) is much more common. Vitruvius and Seneca the Younger also preferred the earlier position.

==== Commonly used phrases ====
In certain commonly used phrases, the adjective comes after the noun without variation:

rēs pūblica
"the Republic"

populus Rōmānus
"the Roman people"

pontifex maximus
"the chief priest"

dī immortālēs
"immortal gods"

In others, the position after the noun is more common but not fixed. The phrase bellum cīvīle "civil war" has the adjective following in about 60% of Cicero's examples.

In other commonly used phrases, the adjective always comes first. These include certain terms of relative position and certain adjectives of time:

dextrum cornū
"the right wing"

novissimum agmen
"the rearmost (part of the) column of soldiers"

hesternō diē
"yesterday"

posterō diē
"the following day"

In other common phrases, such as prīmā lūce "at first light", the adjective usually comes first, but lūce prīmā is also found.

=== Hyperbaton ===
Often adjectives are emphasised by separating them from the noun by other words (a technique known as hyperbaton). This is especially true of adjectives of size and quantity, but also superlatives, comparatives, demonstratives, and possessives.

==== Premodifier hyperbaton ====
Often the adjective precedes the noun:

omnibus hīs adfuit pugnīs.
"He was present at all these battles."

The separation can sometimes be a long one:

multa de Hierōnis rēgis fidē perpetuā ergā populum Rōmānum verba fēcērunt.
"They spoke at great length about the constant loyalty of King Hiero towards the Roman people."

Premodifying adjectives in hyperbaton often have focus or contrastive emphasis. In the following example, "these particular" floods are contrasted with some earlier ones which lasted a shorter time:

hae permānsērunt aquae diēs complūrēs.
"This time the flood waters lasted several days."

Sometimes they are merely brought to the front to emphasise them. So in the following example, the adjective cruentum "bloody" is raised to the beginning of the sentence to highlight it and make it stand out:

cruentum altē tollēns Brūtus pugiōnem.
"Brutus, raising high the bloodstained dagger (cruentum ... pugiōnem)".

Sometimes both the noun and the adjective are important or focussed:

magnus omnium incessit timor animīs.
"Great fear overcame the minds of all of them."

This last sentence is an example of double hyperbaton, since omnium ... animīs "everyone's minds" is an example of genitive hyperbaton.

==== Postmodifier hyperbaton ====
Hyperbaton is also possible when the adjective follows the noun. Often with postmodifier hyperbaton, the noun is indefinite:

tempestātēs coortae sunt maximae.
"Some very great storms arose."

praedā potītus ingentī est.
"He obtained an enormous amount of booty."

If the noun is definite, the adjective can be predicative:

agrōs dēseruit incultōs.
"He abandoned the fields, leaving them uncultivated."

Sometimes the noun, not the adjective, is focussed, and the adjective is a mere tail, as in the following:

multum tē in eō frāter adiuvābit meus, multum Balbus.
"My brother will help you a lot in this, and so will Balbus."

=== Numbers ===
Cardinal numbers tend to come before the noun in Cicero (90% of examples), but in Caesar only 54% come before the noun. When following the noun, the numeral is often focussed, as in the following, where the important information is in the number "three":

Gallia est omnis dīvīsa in partīs trīs.
"Gaul is divided into three parts."

Distributive or plūrālia tantum numerals usually precede the noun, both in Cicero and Caesar:

Octāvius quīnīs castrīs oppidum circumdedit.
"Octavius surrounded the town with five camps."

Ordinals precede the noun in 73% of Caesar's examples. But when used with hōra, they follow:

ab hōrā septimā ad vesperum pugnātum sit.
"The fight continued from the seventh hour until evening."

=== Possessive adjectives ===
==== Personal possessives ====
Possessive adjectives, such as meus "my", suus "his/their", are fairly evenly distributed (68% preceding in Caesar, 56% in a sample of Cicero speeches). When a possessive follows the noun it is unemphatic:

per C. Valerium, ... familiārem suum, cum eō conloquitur.
"He spoke with him through his friend Gaius Valerius."

quō usque tandem abūtēre, Catilīna, patientiā nostrā?
"For how long, Catiline, will you continue to abuse our patience?"

When it is more emphatic, or in contrastive focus, it precedes:

sī, in tantā scrīptōrum turbā, mea fāma in obscūrō sit.
"If, in such a great crowd of writers, my own fame is hidden..."

nōn ad alterīus praescrīptum, sed ad suum arbitrium.
"not according to someone else's dictation, but at their own discretion".

However, the possessive adjective preceding the noun is not always emphatic: when it is tucked away between two more emphatic words it is usually unemphatic:

domum meī frātris incenderat.
"He had set fire to my brother's house."

It is also usual for the possessive to precede the noun when vocative:

'Quid est,' inquit, 'mea Tertia? quid trīstis es?' – 'Mī pater,' inquit,'Persa periit'.
"'What is it, my Tertia? Why are you sad?' – 'My father,' she said, 'Persa has died'."

==== eius and eōrum ====
The 3rd person genitive pronouns, eius "his" and eōrum "their", tend to precede their noun in Caesar (in 73% of instances). Unlike the possessive adjectives, however, there is often no particular emphasis when they are used before a noun:

eius adventū ... cognitō.
"when his arrival was learnt about"

With certain nouns, such as frāter eius "his brother" or familiāris eius "his friend", however, the position after the noun is slightly more usual.

=== Pronominal adjectives ===
Pronominal adjectives are those which can serve both as pronouns and adjectives, such as hic "this", alius "another", quīdam "a certain (man)" and so on. These adjectives generally have genitive singular -īus and dative singular -ī.

The most frequent position for pronominal adjectives is before the noun.

==== Demonstratives ====
Demonstratives, such as ille ("that") and hic ("this"), almost always precede the noun in both in Caesar (99%) and in Cicero's speeches (95%).

When it follows a noun in unemphatic position, hic can often mean "the aforementioned":

Gāvius hic quem dīcō Cōnsānus.
"This Gavius of Consa that I am talking about."

status hic nōn dolendī.
"this state of freedom of pain (which we are discussing)"

In the same way, when it follows a noun, ille can sometimes mean "that famous":

marmorea Venus illa
"that famous marble statue of Venus"

But more frequently, even when it means "the aforementioned", and also when it means "this one here", hic will precede the noun:

hōc nūntiō
"with this news (just mentioned)"

hic A. Licinius
"this Aulus Licinius (whom you see here)"

==== alius and nūllus ====
The pronouns alius "another", alter "another (of two)", ūllus "any", and nūllus "no", when used adjectivally, precede the noun in most cases (93% in both Caesar and Cicero).

sine ūllā dubitātiōne
"without any hesitation"

nūllō modō
"in no way"

aliō locō
"in another place"

illa altera pars ōrātiōnis
"that second part of the speech"

Occasionally, however, when emphatic, they may follow:

certē huic hominī spēs nūlla salūtis esset.
"Certainly this man would have no hope at all of being saved."

In the following, there is a chiasmus (ABBA order):

animus alius ad alia vitia prōpēnsior.
"Different minds are disposed towards different vices."

==== ipse ====
Ipse in phrases such as ipse Alexander ("Alexander himself") usually precedes the noun in Caesar, as also in Cicero, although Cicero's preference is not as strong.

==== quīdam and aliquis ====
The word quīdam "a certain" can either precede or follow its noun:

quīdam homō nōbilis
"a certain nobleman"

scrība quīdam Cn. Flāvius
"a certain scribe, by the name of Gnaeus Flavius"

When it is used with a person's name, it always follows, or else goes between forename and surname:

Epicratēs quīdam
"a certain Epicrates"

Decimus quīdam Vergīnius
"a certain Decimus Verginius"

In such a position it is unemphatic, and the emphasis is on the name.

The other indefinite pronoun, aliquī (the adjectival form of aliquis), similarly can either follow or precede its noun:

ā Flammā, sī nōn potes omne, partem aliquam velim extorqueās.
"From Flamma, even if you can't get everything, at least I should like you to extort some part of the money."

sī nōn omnem at aliquam partem maerōris suī dēpōneret.
"If not all, at least he should put aside some part of his grief"

Of these two, the phrase aliquam partem is slightly more common; and the phrase aliquō modō "somehow or other" is always in that order.

=== Stacked adjectives ===
It has been noted that in various languages when more than one adjective precedes a noun, they tend to come in a particular order. In English the order usually given is: Determiner > Number > Opinion > Size > Quality > Age > Shape > Colour > Participle forms > Origin > Material > Type > Purpose (for example, "those two large brown Alsatian guard dogs"). In general an adjective expressing a non-permanent state (such as "hot") will go further from the noun than an adjective of type or material which expresses an inherent property of the object.

In Latin, when adjectives precede, they generally have the same order as in English:

calida būbula ūrīna
"warm cow urine"

viridēs pīneās nucēs
"green pine nuts"

multōs fōrmōsōs hominēs
"many handsome people".

When the adjectives follow, the opposite order is usually used:

patera aurea gravis
"a heavy gold dish"

ōvum gallīnāceum coctum
"a cooked hen's egg"

epigramma Graecum pernōbile
"a famous Greek inscription"

There are some apparent exceptions, however, such as the following, in which the adjective sūmptuōsam "luxurious" is placed next to the noun:

nūllam suburbānam aut maritimam sūmptuōsam vīllam
"no suburban or sea-side luxurious villa"

The demonstrative hic "this" normally goes before a number, as in English. However, the reverse order is also possible:

in hīs tribus urbibus
"in these three cities"

ūna ex tribus hīs rebus
"one of these three things"

When hic follows a noun, it goes close to it:

avus hic tuus
"this grandfather of yours/your grandfather here"

vītam hanc rūsticam
"this country life"

Adjectives of the same semantic class are usually joined by a conjunction in Latin:

aquam bonam et liquidam
"good clear water"

nātiōnes multae atque magnae
"many great nations"

Quite commonly also, one adjective precedes and another follows, as in:

ērudītissimōs hominēs Asiāticōs
"very learned Asiatic men"

=== Preposition, adjective, noun ===
When a preposition, adjective and noun are used together, this order is the most common one (75% of Caesar's examples):

ex humilī locō ad summam dignitātem
"from a humble position to the highest dignity"

More rarely, a monosyllabic preposition may come between an adjective and noun in hyperbaton:

hāc dē causā
"for this reason"

magnō cum fremitū et clāmōre
"with a great deal of noise and shouting"

However, this is mainly true only of the prepositions cum, dē, ex, and in and mainly with interrogatives and relatives and a limited number of adjectives.

The order preposition, noun, adjective is also less common:

ad bellum Parthicum
"to the war against the Parthians"

== Genitive position ==
=== Possessive genitive ===
Just as with adjectives, a genitive such as hostium "of the enemies" can either precede or follow its head-noun. Thus for "camp of the enemies", both castra hostium and hostium castra are found. Overall, however, there is a slight tendency for a genitive to come after a noun in both Caesar and Cicero (57% of examples).

Individual preferences play a part in genitive position. In Livy books 1–10, castra hostium "the camp of the enemies" (74% of examples) is more common than hostium castra. Caesar, on the other hand, seems to prefer hostium castra (69% of examples). But when a name is used with castra, Caesar usually puts it after the noun (86% of examples), for example castra Labieni "Labienus's camp".

=== Relationship terms ===
With relationship terms, such as uxor "wife", the genitive can go either before or after the noun. Often when it follows, the genitive is unemphatic:

patruus puerī
"the boy's uncle" (referring to a previously mentioned boy).

Often (but not always) when the genitive precedes, it is focussed:

Roscī fuit discipulus
"he was a pupil of Roscius".

One noun which almost always has a preceding genitive is filius/filia "son/daughter":

Periclēs Xanthippī fīlius
"Pericles son of Xanthippus".

=== Objective genitive ===
When the genitive is an objective one, e.g. spem victōriae "hope of victory" or cōnservātōrem Asiae "the saviour of Asia", it normally follows the noun. However, considerations of focus or emphasis can cause it to precede:

rērum auctōres, non fābulārum
"authors of facts, not of fables".

=== Subjective genitive ===
Subjective genitives can precede or follow the noun. For example, with memoria "memory", a subjective genitive usually (but not always) precedes:

hominum memoriā
"in people's memory".

However, with spēs "hope", a subjective genitive usually follows, unless focussed:

spem Catilīnae
"Catiline's hope".

If a phrase has both a subjective and objective genitive, the subjective one (whether it comes before or after the noun) will usually precede the objective one:

in dēspērātiōne omnium salūtis
"in everyone's despair of being saved".

=== Partitive genitive ===
Partitive genitives usually follow the noun:

magna pars mīlitum.
"the majority of the soldiers"

magnus numerus hostium.
"a large number of enemies"

However, the genitive can also sometimes precede, especially if it is a topic or sub-topic:

equitātūs magnam partem ... praemīsit
"he sent the majority of the cavalry on ahead"

=== Adjective, genitive, noun ===
Another place a genitive is often found is between an adjective and the head-noun, especially when the adjective is an emphatic one such as omnis "all":

ex omnibus urbis partibus.
"from all parts of the city"

magnās Gallōrum cōpiās
"large forces of Gauls"

This also applies when a participle is used instead of an adjective:

prōductīs Rōmānōrum cōpiīs.
"the forces of the Romans having been led out".

The orders Adjective-Noun-Genitive and Adjective-Genitive-Noun are both common in Caesar and Cicero; but Genitive-Adjective-Noun is infrequent.

== Enclitic words ==
=== Typical enclitic words ===
There are certain words that are enclitic: they always follow a stronger word. Examples are enim "for", autem "however, moreover", and vērō "indeed", which virtually always come after the first full word of the sentence (not counting prepositions) and are never the first.

est enim profectus in Hispāniam.
"for he has set out for Spain"

dē morte enim ita sentit...
"for his view of death is the following..."

Quīntus enim Ligārius....
"indeed Quintus Ligarius..."

Other words that require a stronger word on which to lean are quoque "also" and quidem "indeed" and can never begin a sentence. Other words, such as ferē "approximately" and etiam, are frequently enclitic:

mediā ferē nocte
"around the middle of the night"

In the phrase nē ... quidem "not even," the word quidem generally follows the first word of the emphasised phrase, rather than the whole phrase:

nē deōs quidem immortālīs.
"not even the immortal gods"

nē hominēs quidem probī.
"not even decent people"

=== Weak pronouns ===
Personal pronouns such as mē "me" and mihī "to me" can have weak and strong forms in Latin. When weak, they tend to be found early in the sentence either after the first word (which can be a conjunction such as cum "when" or et "and") or after an enclitic such as enim, if present:

interim vēnit Philotīmus et mihī ā tē litterās reddidit.
"Meanwhile Philotimus has just come and given me a letter from you."

hoc enim sibī Stāiēnus cognōmen ... dēlēgerat.
"for this was the surname which Staienus had chosen for himself"

duās sibī hērēditātes vēnisse arbitrātus est.
"He considered that two inheritances had come to him."

Contrast sentences like the following have the indirect object being a full noun and following the direct object (which Devine and Stephens consider to be the neutral word order):

quia obsidēs Lārīsaeīs dederant.
"because they had given hostages to the Larisaeans"

Unlike true enclitics, however, pronouns can also sometimes begin a sentence:

eī statim rescrīpsī.
"I wrote back to him at once."

As with the copula est (see above), when a focus phrase or emphatic delayed topic phrase intervenes, the weak pronoun will usually follow it, rather than the first word of the sentence:

aliud enim vōcis genus īrācundia sibī sūmat.
"Anger assumes for itself a different tone of voice."

However, the pronoun is sometimes found in second position, and est then follows the focussed phrase:

nunc mihī tertius ille locus est relictus ōrātiōnis.
"Now what remains of my speech is that third topic."

In the following example, the pronoun follows not the focused word but the conjunction sī "if":

haec sī tibī tuus parēns dīceret....
"If your father were saying this to you..."

In terms of transformational grammar, the sentence can be analysed as being derived from *sī tuus parēns haec tibī dīceret by raising haec and tibī to earlier in the sentence. A functionalist, on the other hand, would say that haec naturally comes first as the topic, then sī in its normal place, then the unemphatic pronoun, without anything being moved.

== See also ==
- Hyperbaton
- Clausula (rhetoric)

== Bibliography ==
- Adams, James (1976). "A typological approach to Latin word order". Indogermanische Forschungen 81: 70–100.
- Clackson, J.P. and Horrocks, G. (2007) The Blackwell History of the Latin Language, Oxford: Blackwell. S.v. “word order”.
- Cunningham, Maurice P. (1957). "Some Phonetic Aspects of Word Order Patterns in Latin". Proceedings of the American Philosophical Society, Vol. 101, No. 5, pp. 481–505.
- D&S = Devine, Andrew M. & Laurence D. Stephens (2006), Latin Word Order. Structured Meaning and Information. Oxford: Oxford University Press. Pp. xii, 639. ISBN 0-19-518168-9. Google books sample. Reviews by M. Esperanza Torrego, Olga Spevak, and Anne Mahoney.
- Danckaert, Lieven (2011). On the left periphery of Latin embedded clauses. University of Gent PhD thesis.
- Danckaert, Lieven (2015). "Studying word order changes in Latin: some methodological remarks". Carlotta Viti. Perspectives on historical syntax, 169, John Benjamins, pp. 233–250, 2015, Studies in Language.
- Gildersleeve, B.L. & Gonzalez Lodge (1895). Gildersleeve's Latin Grammar. 3rd Edition. (Macmillan).
- Greene, John (1907). "Emphasis in Latin Prose". The School Review, Vol. 15, No. 9 (Nov., 1907), pp. 643–654.
- Greene, John (1908a). "How Far Does the Word-Order in Latin Indicate the Proper Emphasis?". The Classical Weekly, Vol. 2, No. 1, pp. 2–4.
- Greene, John (1908b). "How Far Does the Word-Order in Latin Indicate the Proper Emphasis?" (Continued). The Classical Weekly, Vol. 2, No. 2, pp. 10–13.
- Hopper, Paul J. (1985). Review of Panhuis (1982). Language 61–2, 1985, 466–470.
- Linde, P. (1923), "Die Stellung des Verbs in der lateinischen Prosa", Glotta 12.153-178.
- Nisbet, R.G.M. (1999). "The Word-Order of Horace's Odes". Proceedings of the British Academy, 93, 135-154.
- Panhuis, D.G.J. (1982) The Communicative Perspective in the Sentence: a study of Latin word order, Amsterdam–Philadelphia: John Benjamins. Reviews by Hopper (see above) and J.G.F. Powell.
- Pinkster, Harm (1990a), "Evidence for SVO in Latin?", in R. Wright (ed.), Latin and the Romance languages in the early Middle Ages, London, Routledge, 69-82.
- Pinkster, Harm (1990b), Latin Syntax and Semantics, chapter 9 "Word Order".
- Powell, J.G. (2010) "Hyperbaton and register in Cicero", in E. Dickey and A. Chahoud (eds.), Colloquial and Literary Latin, Cambridge: Cambridge University Press, 163–185.
- Rose, H.J. (1924). Review of J. Marouzeau (1922), "L'Ordre des Mots dans la Phrase latine: I. Les Groupes nominaux". The Classical Review, vol. 38, issue 1-2.
- Scrivner, Olga B. (2015). A Probabilistic Approach in Historical Linguistics: Word Order Change in Infinitival Clauses: From Latin to Old French. Indiana University PhD Thesis.
- Skopeteas, Stavros (2011). Word order in Latin locative constructions: A corpus study in Caesar's De bello gallico. Published online.
- Spevak, Olga (2010). Constituent Order in Classical Latin Prose. Studies in Language Companion Series (SLCS) 117. Amsterdam/Philadelphia: John Benjamins Publishing Company, 2010. Pp. xv, 318. ISBN 9789027205841. Reviews by J.G.F. Powell and James Brookes. (See also K. McDonald, Review of Spevak (2008)).
- Spevak, Olga (2014). The Noun Phrase in Classical Latin Prose. Amsterdam studies in classical philology, 21. Leiden; Boston: Brill, 2014. Pp. xiii, 377. ISBN 9789004264427. Review by Patrick McFadden.
- Ullman, Berthold L. (1919) "Latin Word-Order". The Classical Journal Vol. 14, No. 7 (Apr., 1919), pp. 404–417.
- Walker, Arthur T. (1918) "Some Facts of Latin Word Order". The Classical Journal, Vol. 13, No. 9, pp. 644–657.
