= Wolfgang Butzkamm =

German linguist

Wolfgang Butzkamm (born 11 November 1938) is Professor Emeritus of English as a foreign language at Aachen University, Germany. He is credited with the development of a principled and systematic approach to the role of the mother tongue in foreign language teaching which radically differs from a target-language-only philosophy prevailing in many countries. For him, traditional monolingualism is an instance of a more general naturalistic fallacy which is committed when foreign language teaching is modelled after the natural acquisition of a first language (L1), as in the direct method (education) which was also called the natural method.

== Life ==
Butzkamm is an applied linguist. He was born in 1938 and was educated at the universities of Marburg, Münster, Dortmund, and Appleton (Wis.). He began his career as an innovative teacher of English, German and French as foreign languages, and was appointed to the Chair of English Language Teaching in Aachen in 1973.

== Enlightened monolingualism and the principle of dual comprehension ==
Butzkamm was inspired by C. J. Dodson's language teaching and the bilingual method when he pioneered his “aufgeklärte Einsprachigkeit” (enlightened or informed monolingualism) in 1973, which in Germany has become almost a stock phrase. Since languages are learned from use, the foreign language is by itself the primary means of acquiring it and must accordingly be made the working language of the classroom. This is however best achieved by systematic mother tongue support. While the implicit activation of mother tongue skills is initially inevitable, explicit systematic mother tongue support is desirable because it promotes positive language transfer.

(1) Bilingual meaning conveyance is safe, effective and practical when the sandwich technique is used

- French teacher of English: “What’s the matter? Qu’y a-t-il? What’s the matter”?
- German teacher of English: “You’ve skipped a line. Du hast eine Zeile übersprungen. You’ve skipped a line.”

This technique of sandwiching the translation of an unknown expression can be carried out very discreetly in the tone of an aside, as a kind of whispered interpreting. It should be a central technique as it is the quickest way to make authentic classroom communication possible: statement in L2, restatement in L1 and again in L2; L2 =>L1=>L2.

(2) Sometimes, a combination of idiomatic and didactic literal translation which Butzkamm calls "mirroring” can be highly effective, as it clarifies both what is meant and how it is said: The necessity, even inevitability of this kind of mother tongue support is more obvious when the target language is typologically remote and genetically unrelated to the native language:

Es gibt zu viele (German)
= There are too many (clarifies the meaning)
= *It gives too many (renders the structure transparent)

Quand je serai grand (French)
= When I’m big (clarifies the meaning)
= *When I will-be big (renders the structure transparent)

Shànghǎi bǐ Běijīng dà (Mandarin)
= Shanghai is bigger than Beijing (clarifies the meaning)
= *Shanghai bǐ (=than) Beijing big (renders the structure transparent)

Although not all constructions can be mirrored quite so comfortably, for Butzkamm this dual comprehension (functional understanding / decoding plus structural understanding / codebreaking) is the most important single factor in language acquisition. Only this kind of double understanding enables the learner to create and risk numerous sentences of his own, making, in Humboldt's words, “infinite use of finite means” (the generative principle):

- Es gibt zu viele Kinder. There are too many children.
- Es gibt zu wenige Lehrer. There are too few teachers.
- Es gibt Politiker, die… There are politicians who…
- Gibt es Philosophen, die…? Are there philosophers who…?

Teachers must teach in ways so that the sentences learners hear or read become syntactical germ-cells and models for many more sentences.

Idiomatic translation and mother tongue mirroring combined provide immediate access to a complete meaning of foreign language constructions, often making further explanations superfluous. By contrast, the currently accepted approach seems to see the mother tongue as an intruder only, and a persistent temptation for pupils and (tired) teachers to fall back on, more of a hindrance than a help. The advice commonly given is to use it as little as possible, as a last resort in meaning-conveyance or for grammatical explanations (which themselves must be kept to a minimum).

According to Butzkamm, this is a "colossal mistake" and "definitely Eurocentric". While acknowledging that the indiscriminate and haphazard use of the mother tongue is all too frequent and must be avoided, Butzkamm insists that the role of the native language should be re-defined as the major resource in foreign language learning and teaching. As children grow into their mother tongue (1) they have learnt to conceptualize their world and have fully grasped the symbolic function of language; (2) they have learnt to communicate; (3) they have learnt to speak and use their voice; (4) they have acquired an intuitive understanding of grammar and have become aware of many of the finer points of language; (5) they have acquired the secondary skills of reading and writing. The mother tongue is therefore, in his view, the greatest asset people bring to the task of foreign language learning. It provides an indispensable Language Acquisition Support System - a term used by Jerome Bruner in the context of first language acquisition - which makes instruction possible in the first place.

Successful learners capitalise on the vast amount of both linguistic skills and world knowledge they have already accumulated via the mother tongue. For the most part, they need not reconceptualise their world in the new language. The path breaking power of L1 grammar is not dependent on the fact that both languages share similar grammatical features. It is because all languages have evolved means of expressing abstract ideas such as possession, number, agent, instrument, negation, cause, condition, obligation etc., no matter how they do this, that one natural language is enough to open the door for the grammars of other languages. In a deep sense, we only learn language once.

That is why, according to Butzkamm, the monolingual orthodoxy, with or without small concessions, cannot be supported in any respect. The target-language-only credo must be overturned and foreign language teaching methodology stood on its feet again. Butzkamm and Caldwell's (2009) call for a paradigm shift is in line with Hall and Cook's conclusion in their state-of-the-art article (2012, 299) that “the way is open for a major paradigm shift in language teaching and learning”. However, in Butzkamm's “informed monolingualism”, not a single monolingual technique, simple or sophisticated, is thrown out. Bilingual techniques are clearly intended to enrich existing methodologies, and not to impoverish them. Teachers will have to decide which technique will serve their purpose best in a given situation. To sum it up in one maxim: Teach English through English – but with the help of the mother tongue.
