= Lingua Latina per se illustrata =

Latin learning textbook by Hans Ørberg

- Author: Hans Ørberg
- Original title: Lingua Latina secundum naturae rationem explicata
- Illustrator: Peer Lauritzen
- Language: Latin

Lingua Latina per se illustrata consists of two Latin textbooks by the Danish Latinist, Hans H. Ørberg. The book is meant to teach Classical Latin through Ørberg's preferred teaching method called the natural method. The entire book is written in Latin with no translations into other languages. The reader is expected to learn Latin through context, marginal notes, and illustrations rather than direct translations and memorization.

The two volumes in the series are Pars I: Familia Romana followed by Pars II: Roma Aeterna. Pars I: Familia Romana is an introduction to basic Latin vocabulary and grammar. Pars II: Roma Aeterna is a more advanced continuation where the author introduces more advanced Latin literature.

== Book structure ==
The first volume, Pars I: Familia Romana has 35 chapters and revolves around the life of a Roman family. Each chapter starts with a story about the Roman family followed by Latin grammar and lastly exercises. The reader is expected to learn around 1,800 words by the end of the book. Towards the end of the book, there are also excerpts from classical authors and Donatus's Ars Grammatica.

Pars II: Roma Aeterna follows the history of Rome from beginning through the Republican and imperial periods. This volume includes texts from renowned writers such as Virgil, Cicero, Livy, and Sallust. {{Cite Web | Latina Lingva Pars I

== Reception ==
Lingua Latina per se illustrata has received numerous reviews in renowned classical-studies publications including Latomus, The Classical World, Forum Classicum and the Journal of Classics Teaching.

Chloë Barnett described the course's objective of bringing learners to fluent reading of original texts as ambitious in a 2019 review. She said that the book's use in schools and colleges in the United States and Europe and considered Roma Aeterna particularly useful for students seeking greater reading fluency. She also observed that extensive explanations in an English-language companion could conflict with the course's principle of understanding Latin through Latin.

== Editions and availability ==
Current editions from Hackett Publishing feature full-color illustrations by Peer Lauritzen. Numerous supplements are available, including teacher materials, glossaries, and online courseware.

== Supplementary materials ==
- Exercitia Latina I and Exercitia Latina II, collections of exercises corresponding to the two core volumes
- Colloquia Personarum, short dialogues using the vocabulary and grammar of Familia Romana
- Fabulae Syrae, mythological stories designed to accompany the later chapters of ''Familia Romana''
- Grammatica Latina, a brief summary of Latin morphology
- Latine Disco

== See also ==
- Direct method (education)
- Latin language
- Latin literature
- Luigi Miraglia
- Accademia Vivarium Novum
