= Eclectic =

Eclectic may refer to:

== Music ==
- Eclectic (Eric Johnson and Mike Stern album), 2014
- Eclectic (Big Country album), 1996
- Eclectic Method, name of an audio-visual remix act
- Eclecticism in music, the conscious use of styles alien to the composer's own nature
- Eclectic Discs, a record label renamed to Esoteric Recordings
- Eclectic Reel, a collection of music by Italian composer Stefano Lentini

== Organizations ==
- Eclectic Society (Christian), an English missionary and anti-slavery society
- Eclectic Society (fraternity), an American fraternity, Phi Nu Theta
- The Brighton Pier Group, formerly known as Eclectic Bar Group, British leisure and hospitality company

== Other ==
- Eclectic, Alabama, a village
- Eclecticism, a philosophical movement
- Eclecticism in architecture, a nineteenth and twentieth-century architectural style
- Eclecticism in art, mixed styles
- Eclectic approach, an approach to education
- Eclectic paradigm, an economic theory, published by John H. Dunning in 1980
- Eclectic medicine, a 19th century combination of herbalism, physical therapies, and other substances
- Eclectic paganism, paganism mixed with other religious paths or philosophies
- Eclectic psychotherapy, in which the clinician uses more than one approach
- Eclectic shorthand, or cross shorthand, a system of shorthand

== See also ==
- Hybrid martial arts
