= Eclectic approach =

English grammar

Eclectic approach is a method of language education that combines various approaches and methodologies to teach language depending on the aims of the lesson and the abilities of the learners. Different teaching methods are borrowed and adapted to suit the requirement of the learners. It breaks the monotony of the class.

In addition, It is a conceptual approach that does not merely include one paradigm or a set of assumptions. Instead, eclecticism adheres to or is constituted from several theories, styles, and ideas in order to gain a thorough insight about the subject, and draws upon different theories in different cases. ‘Eclecticism’ is common in many fields of study such as psychology, martial arts, philosophy, teaching, religion and drama

== Approaches and methods ==
There are varied approaches and methods used for language teaching. In eclectic approach, the teacher can choose from these different methods and approaches:

- Grammar-translation Method: It is a method of teaching languages by which students learn grammatical rules and then apply those rules by translating between the target language and the native language.
- Direct Method: In this method the teacher refrains from using the students' native language. The target language is directly used for teaching all the four skills—listening, speaking, reading and writing.
- Structural-situational Approach: In this approach, the teacher teaches language through a careful selection, gradation and presentation of vocabulary items and structures through situation based activities.
- Audio-lingual/Audio-visual Method: In this style of teaching students are taught through a system of reinforcement. Here new words and grammar are directly taught without using the students' native language. However, unlike direct method, audio-lingual method does not focus on vocabulary. Instead, the teacher focuses on grammar through drill and practice.
- Bilingual Method: The word 'bilingual' means the ability to speak two languages fluently. In bilingual method, the teacher teaches the language by giving mother tongue equivalents of the words or sentences. This method was developed by C.J. Dodson.
- Communicative Language Teaching: This approach lays emphasis on oral method of teaching. It aims to develop communicative competence in students.
- Total-Physical Response: It is based on the theory that memory is enhanced through association with physical response.
- The Silent Way: In this method the teacher uses a combination of silence and gestures to focus students' attention. It was developed by Caleb Gattegno.

== Advantages ==
- The teacher has more flexibility.
- No aspect of language skill is ignored.
- There is variety in the classroom.
- Classroom atmosphere is dynamic.
- These types of programs not only negotiate teacher skill-development within an improved recognition of and respect for cross-cultural and multi-linguistic classroom settings, but also encourages student pride in their heritage, language, communication preferences and self-identity
- One method can support the weaknesses of the other.
- Multiple intelligences in the classroom are better developed.
- Assistance to the different Students' learning styles
