= Latin school =

School type in Europe from the 14th to 19th centuries

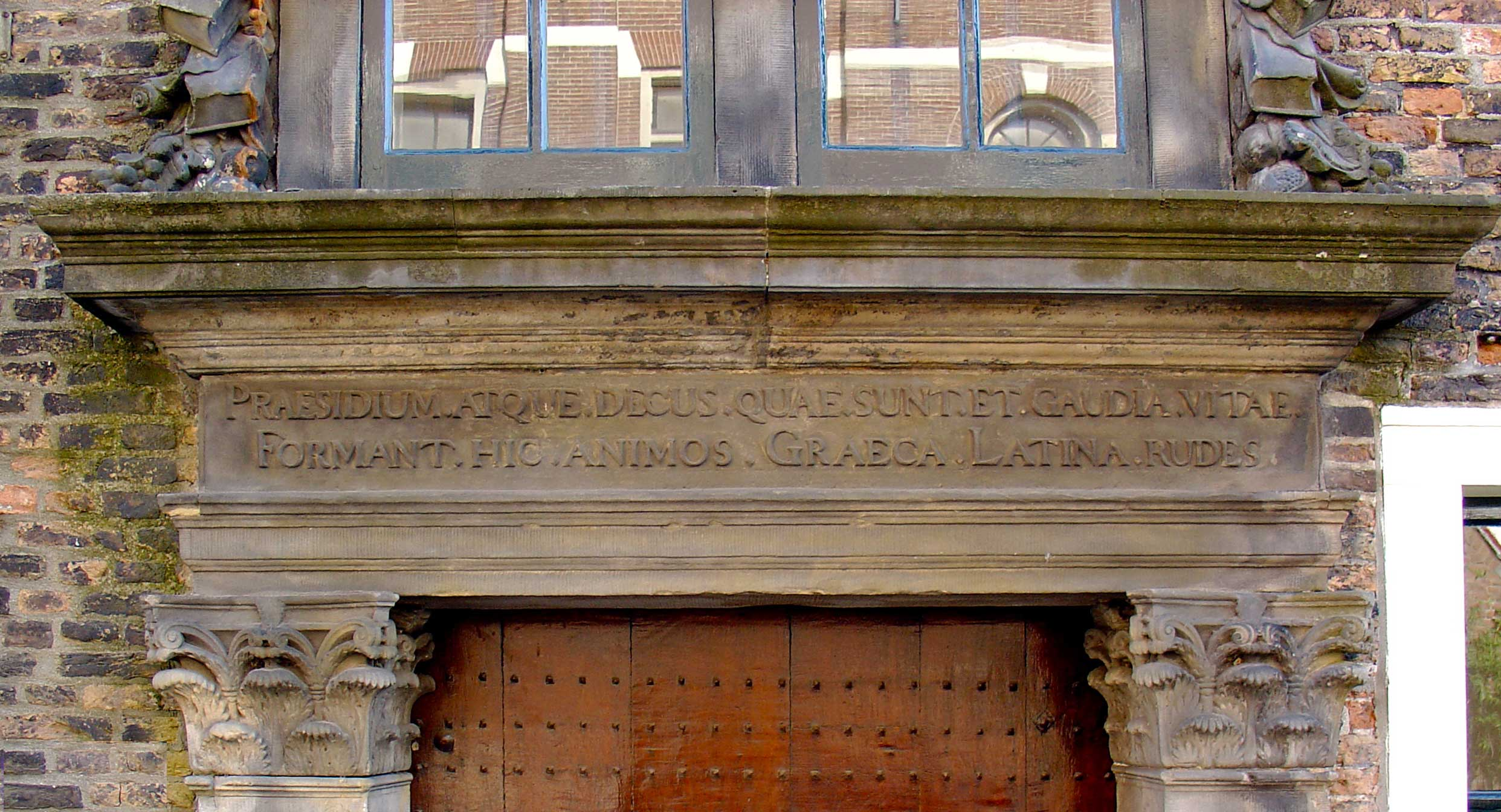
Inscription above the entrance of the former Latin school in Gouda: Praesidium atque decus quae sunt et gaudia vitae – Formant hic animos Graeca Latina rudes

The Latin school was the grammar school of 14th- to 19th-century Europe, though the latter term was much more common in England. Other terms used include Lateinschule in Germany, or later Gymnasium. Latin schools were also established in Colonial America.

Emphasis was placed on learning Latin, initially in its Medieval Latin form. Grammar was the most basic part of the trivium and the liberal arts. Latin schools aimed to prepare students for university, as well as seeking to enable those of middle-class status to rise above their station. It was therefore not unusual for children of commoners to attend Latin schools, especially if they were expected to pursue a career within the church. Although Latin schools existed in many parts of Europe in the 14th century and were more open to the laity, prior to that the sole purpose was of training those who would one day become clergymen. Latin schools began to develop to reflect Renaissance humanism around the 1450s and often followed the Studia Humanitatis concept. In some countries, but not England, they later lost their popularity as universities and some Catholic orders began to prefer the vernacular.

== History ==
=== Medieval background ===
Medieval Europe thought of grammar as a foundation from which all forms of scholarship should originate. Grammar schools otherwise known as Latin schools taught Latin by using Latin. Latin was the language used in nearly all academic and most legal and administrative matters, as well as the language of the liturgy. Some of the laity, though not instructed formally, spoke and wrote some Latin. Courts, especially church courts, used Latin in their proceedings, although this was even less accessible than the vernacular to the lower classes, who often could not read at all, let alone Latin.

Students often studied in Latin school for about five years, but by their third year, students would be deemed as "knowledgeable enough" in Latin grammar to assist the master teacher in teaching the younger or less skilled pupils. Most boys began at the age of seven but older men who wanted to study were not discouraged as long as they could pay the fees. Students usually finished their schooling during their late teens, but those who desired to join the priesthood had to wait until they were twenty-four in order to get accepted. There was usually a limit to how long a student could stay in school, although if a relative was one of the school's founders then an extended stay was possible.

Schools were managed by appointing a committee who then employed a teacher and paid their salary. These schools usually had limited supervision from the town authorities. Freelance Latin masters opened up their own schools quite frequently and would provide Latin education to anyone willing to pay. These freelance schools usually taught students in the master's home. Others taught as a tutor in a student's household by either living there or making daily visits to teach. Students ranged from those who were members of the peasantry to those of the elite. If a serf's child wanted to go to school, payment given to the lord was required (to replace the value of his labour) as well as his consent.

=== Renaissance and Early Modern perceptions ===
As Europeans experienced the intellectual, political, economic and social innovations of the Renaissance so did their attitudes towards Medieval Latin schools. Renaissance humanists criticized Medieval Latin calling it "barbaric jargon". Scholars like the Dutch humanist, Desiderius Erasmus (1466–1536), denounced the church and the way it taught. He desired that a Renaissance in the Roman Catholic Church should accompany the study of the classics. Humanist ideas became so influential that residents in Italian states began to call for a new kind of education in Latin. Schools and academies that centred on instructing classical literature, history, rhetoric, dialectic, natural philosophy, arithmetic, medieval texts, the Greek language, as well as modern foreign languages, emerged. They called this new curriculum the Studia Humanitatis. Latin school formed the basis of education in the elite Italian city-states. Positions such as headmaster of grammar schools or professor of Latin grammar, rhetoric and dialect, were filled in by erudite humanists. Guarino da Verona, another humanist, devised three stages for humanistic learning: the elementary, the grammatical and the rhetorical. Humanists held the belief that by being a learned individual they were contributing to society. Hence, humanistic education constituted the intermediate and advanced levels for most of the urban population. It created an opportunity to advance an individual's social status since more institutions intellectual, political and economic sought workers who possessed a background in classical Latin as well as training in humanistic scripts.

Still considered as the language of the learned, Latin was esteemed and used frequently in the academic field. However, at the start of the 14th century, writers started writing in the vernacular. Due to this event and the common practice of interweaving Latin with a dialect even at advanced stages in learning, the precedence of Latin schools from other pedagogical institutions diminished.

== Latin church schools ==
Clergy often funded ecclesiastical schools where clerics taught. Many historians argue that up until 1300 the Church had a monopoly on education in medieval Italy. Latin church schools seemed to appear around the 12th century; however, very few remained after the 14th century, as a vernacular, more definite form of Latin school emerged in Italy. In some areas in Spain during the late 15th century, the church encouraged priests and sacristans to train others in reading and writing.

After the Protestant Reformation, the Catholic Church tried to deal with the surfacing of Protestant Latin schools that involved itself with orienting church authorities and pastors. John Calvin, a reformer, taught Latin grammar along with the Geneva catechism. Nevertheless, there were some reformers who wanted to cease using Latin in worship, finding the vernacular a more efficient language to use. In the latter part of the 16th century, the Catholic Counter-Reformation supported the establishment of municipal schools. Jesuits founded their own schools and offered free training in Latin grammar, Philosophy, Theology, Geography, Religious Doctrine and History for boys. It was important for Jesuits as well as the Catholic Reformation to instruct clergymen as well as laymen in this type of education. The Jesuits pursued the significance of education to their order and took over the teaching responsibilities in Latin schools and secondary schools along with other Catholic orders in several Catholic areas.

== Latin school curriculum ==
The Latin school curriculum was based mainly on reading Classical and some medieval authors. Students had to learn the principles of Ars Dictaminis in order to learn how to write formal letters. Authors often had lists of books that were supposed to be used in the curriculum that would teach students grammar. These texts however, were often not the original texts, as more often than not, texts were changed to include moral stories or to display rules of grammar. These were usually in the form of fables or poems. New students generally started off with easy basic grammar, and steadily moved into harder Latin readings such as the Donatus (Ars Minor stage), which was a syntax manual that was memorized, or even more advanced with glossaries and dictionaries. Although many teachers used many books that varied from person to person, the most popular textbook would have been the Doctrinale. The Doctrinale was a long verse of Latin grammar. This textbook dealt with parts of speech, syntax, quantity and meter, as well as figures of speech. The Doctrinale as well as a large sum of other books (though not nearly as popular) was often referred to as the "canon of textbooks". Similarly, as the student advanced into the Ars Dictaminis stage more theory and practice writing formal or prose letters were focused on. Poetry was often a teachers favorite as it taught not only Latin, but mnemonic value and "truth". Poetry was not chiefly studied during the medieval times, although some classic poems were taken into the curriculum. However, during the Renaissance, pupils greatly studied poetry in order to learn metrics and style. As well, it was viewed as a broader study of Latin grammar and rhetoric, which often included concepts, and analysis of words

=== Ars Dictaminis ===
Ars Dictaminis was an area of study that was created in the latter part of the Middle Ages as a response to the demand for social communication as offices for religious and political leaders increased. Rhetoric was seen as a method of persuasion and so there were five distinct aspects of Ars Dictaminis that assured this. These five elements were: "how to word a question; how to dispose material; how to find the right words and effective stylistic devices; how to commit everything to memory; how to find the right intonation and suitable gestures". During the Renaissance however, rhetoric developed into the study of how to write official and private letters as well as records. The revised Ars Dictaminis took its guidelines from one of Cicero's works, the de inventione and pseudo-Ciceronian Rhetorica ad Herennium. There were five main parts: the salutatio (salutation), benevolentiae (winning the agreement of the recipient through the arrangement of words), narratio (the point of the discussion), petitio (petition), and conclusio (conclusion). This systematic presentation was attributed to the Medieval preference for hierarchal organization.

=== Studia Humanitatis ===
Studia Humanitatis was the new curriculum founded in the Early Modern Era by humanists. In order to be able to move forward academically, a firm foundation in Studia Humanitatis starting from elementary school was necessary. Those who studied under Ars Dictaminis but did not have this background found it difficult to get accepted into chanceries following the year 1450. Those who did study under this discipline were taught classical literature, history, rhetoric, dialectic, natural philosophy, arithmetic, some medieval texts, Greek as well as modern foreign languages. The use of pagan authors became more common as the church became less involved with the humanistic method used in academic institutions before university. Colloquies (1518), a book containing dialogues written for the study of Latin grammar, was written by Erasmus and became one of the most popular books of its time. Students of Studia Humanitatis were seen as well prepared for occupations pertaining to politics or business. Learning the classics and other subjects in this curriculum enabled the individual to speak, argue and write with eloquence and relevance. The concept of Studia Humanitatis is revived at the Accademia Vivarium Novum, based at Villa Falconieri in Frascati near Rome, Italy.

== Other institutions ==
Early Modern children were first taught to read and write the vernacular and were then sent to Latin schools. If the parents were financially able, the child went even before he learned to read or write if the opportunity was present. Men were the usual students since women were either taught at home or in nunneries. Subsequent to the Council of Trent's decision to cloister all female religious, female orders such as Ursulines and Angelicals conducted their own schools within their convents. University was the final stage of academic learning and within its walls Latin was the language of lectures and scholarly debates. Jews however, including those who were converted into Christianity, were not allowed to teach so they developed their own schools which taught Doctrine, Hebrew and Latin.

== Latin schools in colonial North America and the US ==
Latin schools, on the same model, were founded in North America, importing the European methods of education. The first of these was Boston Latin School, founded in 1635. These fed early universities such as Harvard, with students capable of speaking, reading and debating in Latin. The challenge to the Latin, Greek and "classical" domination of education came earlier than in Europe, but the tradition continued at a diminished level through the 20th century and into the 21st. A number of "Latin Schools" still exist in the US, some of which teach Latin, while others do not.

== See also ==
- Donatus
- Latin poetry
