= Studia Humanitatis =

Studia humanitatis ('humanistic studies,' also briefly called Humaniora; literally "studies of humanity") or studia humaniora is the Latin term used since the Renaissance for the entirety of the humanistic educational program.

This program was based on a return to the Greek and Roman Antiquity, which required the learning and cultivation of the Greek language and especially the Latin language. It also included disciplines like rhetoric, grammar, history, poetry, and moral philosophy. Not all Renaissance humanists possessed good knowledge of Greek, but excellent mastery of Latin was expected in any case. The modern Humanities as teaching and research disciplines are derived from this tradition.

== Concept and history ==
Renaissance humanists adopted the term humanitas from their most important ancient model, the orator Marcus Tullius Cicero. Cicero emphasized that humans are distinguished from animals by language, thereby providing a rationale for placing the cultivation of linguistic art, as the specifically human characteristic, at the center of education. His ideal of the cultivated person was the universally educated "perfect orator" (orator perfectus). This orator is a scholar, but his erudition is not an end in itself; it is always aimed at public and political life, as he is simultaneously a politician.

Cicero's concept of Humanitas, adopted by the humanists, includes virtues like mildness, justice, and benevolent conduct toward fellow humans, but it differs from the modern concepts of humanity or benevolence. Unlike these, it does not center on respect for all people and their "humane" treatment, but on intellectual cultivation. "Compassion" or "philanthropy" in the modern sense is thus only a part of Cicero's and the Renaissance humanists' humanitas, one of the fruits of the studia humanitatis. The word humanitas, though not the substance of its component disciplines, dropped out of common use in the later Middle Ages but underwent a flowering and a transformation in the Renaissance.

The term studia humanitatis was first used in the year 1369 by the Italian humanist Coluccio Salutati. Salutati understood this to mean a group of educational disciplines: the fields of Grammar, Rhetoric, Poetry, Moral philosophy (in contrast to scholastic Natural philosophy) and ancient history. These were the humanistic subjects. Excluded from this were Logic, Metaphysics, Mathematics, Science, Medicine, Law, Theology, and the Artes mechanicae; the term studia humanitatis, succeeding the medieval artes liberales, served to distinguish itself from these fields of knowledge.

At the beginning of the 15th century, Leonardo Bruni praised the pioneer of humanism, Francesco Petrarca, for having renewed the studia humanitatis which had died out in the Middle Ages. According to the Italian humanists, Petrarch, who did not yet use this exact expression himself, was the founder of humanistic studies. The word humanista (Humanist) was derived from the studia humanitatis in the late 15th century, initially used only in student jargon as an occupational title for professors of humanistic subjects. As a term for humanists (the humanistically educated), humanista only became common in the 16th century.

Coluccio Salutati declared humanitas to be the goal of education and was the first to establish a curriculum for it, assuming that the humanistic subjects formed a unity. He understood humanitas as the combination of virtus (virtue) and doctrina (instruction). This was an educational reform; the humanists were convinced that the late medieval educational system of Scholasticism was obsolete and had to be replaced by a completely new concept. The aim was to orient the humanistic subjects toward moral philosophy for the purpose of its practical application, i.e., the education of the person into a moral personality based on ancient role models. Therefore, Leonardo Bruni wrote that the studia humanitatis were so named because they "perfect and adorn" the human being. Consequently, in the view of the humanists, the humanistically educated person deserved the highest social prestige; education was considered more important than political or military power, wealth, or nobility. Everything that did not directly contribute to virtuous human conduct in the sense of the humanistic ideal (i.e., had no benefit for life from a humanistic perspective) was usually rejected by the humanists as superfluous or at least classified as secondary. This primarily included scientific curiosity and speculative metaphysical epistemological pursuits.

In the 18th century, Denis Diderot and the French Encyclopédistes censured the studia humanitatis for what they claimed had by then become its dry, exclusive concentration on Latin and Greek texts and language.

== Humanities ==
The term Humanities is a categorization of science common in the modern English-speaking world that subsumes all sciences relating to humans (as individuals or collectives). Meanwhile, the term has also gained acceptance in German.

The Humanities usually include both the Human Sciences (such as psychology, pedagogy, geography, etc.) and the Geisteswissenschaften including linguistic and literary studies, philosophy, art studies, history in the broadest sense, as well as the social sciences and economics. The Humanities are based on the classical, philologically oriented educational canon of Renaissance humanism. Most university degrees in the Humanities include "of Arts" in the academic title, such as Bachelor of Arts or Master of Arts.

By the 19th century, as the purview of the humanities expanded, they began to define their identity not so much by separating from the realm of the divine but by excluding the material and methods of the maturing physical sciences, which tended to examine the world objectively, without reference to human meaning and purpose.

Contemporary conceptions of the humanities often distinguish them from both the physical and the social sciences. In the late 19th century, the German philosopher Wilhelm Dilthey called the humanities “the spiritual sciences” and “the human sciences,” describing them as areas of knowledge that lay outside the subject matter of the physical sciences. On the other hand, Heinrich Rickert, an early 20th-century Neo-Kantian, argued that it is method of investigation that best characterizes the humanities: whereas the physical sciences aim to move from particular instances to general laws, the human sciences are “idiographic”; they are devoted to the unique value of the particular within its cultural and human contexts and do not seek general laws. The American philosopher Martha Nussbaum has emphasized the crucial importance of education in the humanities for maintaining a healthy democracy, fostering a deeper understanding of human concerns and values, and enabling students to rise above parochial perspectives and become genuine citizens of the world.

The renaissance concept of Studia Humanitatis is revived at the Accademia Vivarium Novum, based at Villa Falconieri in Frascati near Rome, Italy.

== See also ==
- Latin school
- Artes liberales
- Artes mechanicae

== Literature ==
- August Buck: Die „studia humanitatis“ im italienischen Humanismus. In: Wolfgang Reinhard (Hrsg.): Humanismus im Bildungswesen des 15. und 16. Jahrhunderts (= Deutsche Forschungsgemeinschaft. Mitteilung der Kommission für Humanismusforschung. 12). Acta Humaniora, Weinheim 1984, ISBN 3-527-17012-X, S. 11–24.
- Søren Kjørup: Humanities. Geisteswissenschaften. Sciences humaines. Eine Einführung. Metzler, Stuttgart u. a. 2001, ISBN 3-476-01823-7.
- François Renaud: Humanitas. In: Gert Ueding (Hrsg.): Historisches Wörterbuch der Rhetorik. Volume 4: Hu–K. Niemeyer, Tübingen 1998, ISBN 3-484-68104-7, Sp. 80–86.
