= Indonesia Technocrat University =

Private university in Bandar Lampung, Indonesia

Universitas Teknokrat Indonesia
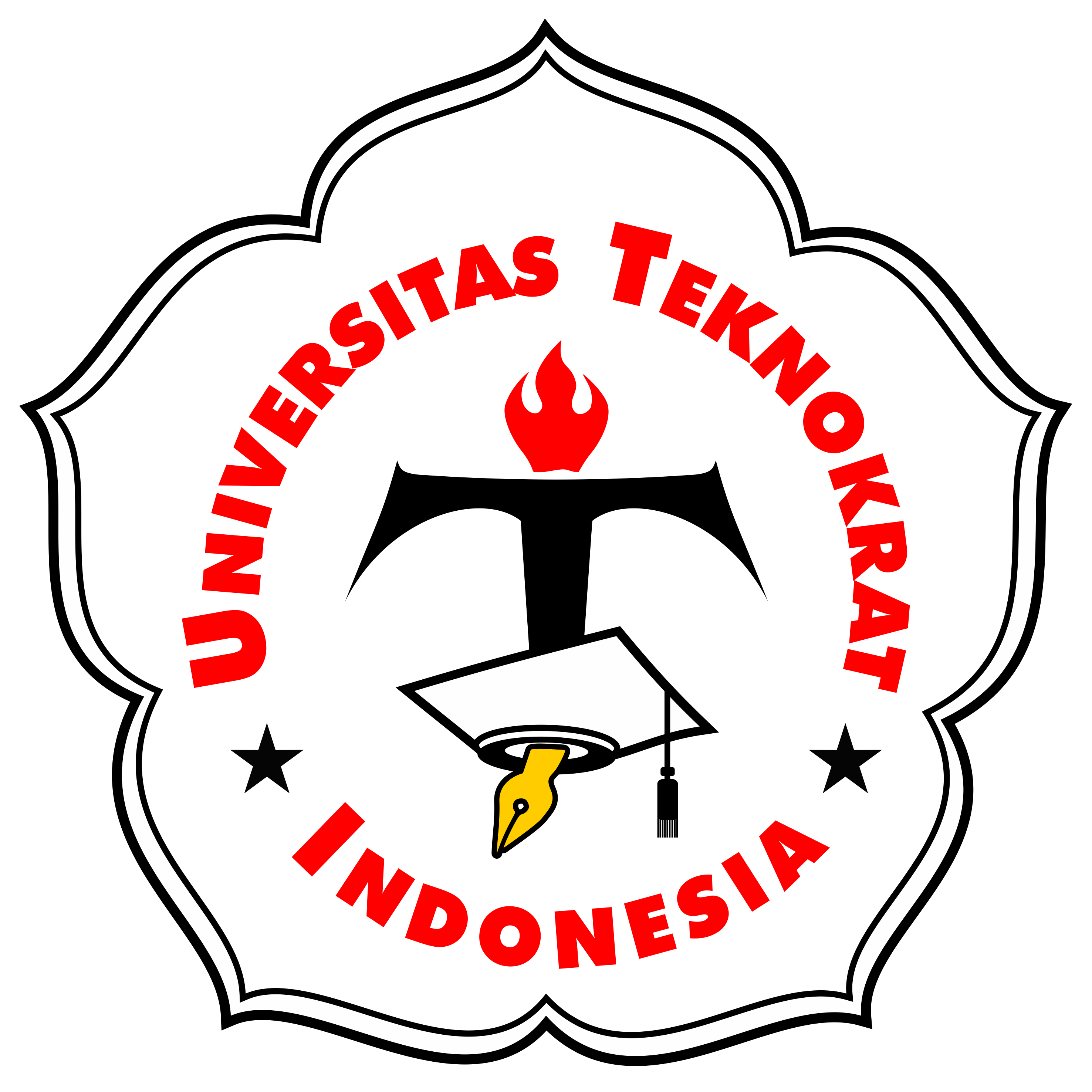
- Motto: Disiplin, Bermutu, kreatif, Inovatif
- Motto in English: Disciplined, Qualified, Creative, Innovative
- Type: Private
- Established: 2017
- Chairman: Dr. H.M. Nasrullah Yusuf, SE., MBA.
- Location: Jl. Z.A. Pagar Alam 9-11, Bandar Lampung, Indonesia
- Website: www.teknokrat.ac.id

Universitas Teknokrat Indonesia is a private higher education in Bandar Lampung, Sumatra, Indonesia. Subjects taught include information management, computer science, and languages.

== History ==
The school was first known as Technocrat Course and Training Center. This course was first established under a Depdikbud permit of Lampung Province on February 29, 1986, by Dr. H.M. Nasrullah Yusuf, S.E., M.B.A.

When it was first established, Technocrat Course and Training Center was designed for courses in English, accounting, training, and manual typing. The tutors were Dr. Masrullah Yusuf and his wife, Hj. Hernaini, S.S., M.Pd.

In 1995, Technocrat Course and Training Center changed its name into Teknokrat Education Institution. This institution led two departments, they were Course and Training Department and the Business and Management Education Institution Department. Then, Business and Management Education Institution continued to develop its education programs. In 1996, Teknokrat, a one-year Institution of higher education, began its teaching and learning process, and it has continued until now. The Higher School of Teknokrat was established in 2000.

== College ==
Teknokrat is located at Zainal Abidin Pagaralam Street No. 9-11 Labuhan Ratu, Bandar Lampung. This school provides three institutions; they are Higher School of Information management and Computer Teknokrat, Academic of Information Management and Computer Science Teknokrat, and Higher School of Foreign Language Teknokrat.

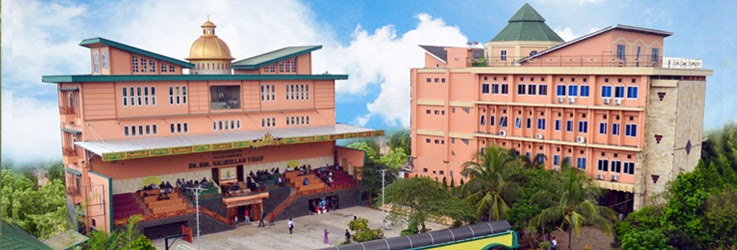
Higher school of Teknokrat

=== Higher School of Information Management and Computer (STMIK) Teknokrat ===
STMIK Teknokrat received its operational permission and legal status on February 8, 2001, and has registered itself with the Indonesian Directorate General of Higher Education with the letter No. 13/D/O/2001. Its study programs are S1 degrees of Information Technique (TI) and Information System (SI). Those programs have been accredited ‘B’ by the National Accreditation Board for Higher Education (BAN PT).

=== Academy of Information Management and Computer (AMIK) Teknokrat ===
AMIK Teknokrat received its operational permission and legal status on June 9, 2000, and has registered itself with the Indonesian Directorate General of Higher Education with the letter No. 92/D/O/2000. Its study programs are Computerized Accounting (TA), Information Management (MI), and Computer Technique (TK).

=== Higher School of Foreign Language (STBA) Teknokrat ===
STBA Teknokrat received its operational permission and legal status on April 25, 2000, and has registered itself with the Indonesian Directorate-General of Higher Education with the letter No. 48/D/O/2000. Its study programs are S1 English Literature, D3 English, and D3 Japanese.

== Student Activity Unit ==
Student Activity Unit (UKM) is a student organization whose function is to accommodate a variety of interests and talents of the students in Teknokrat. The Student Activity Units are:

=== Student Academic Units ===
1. UKM Robotics
2. UKM TEC
3. UKM Animation Design
4. UKM Programming

=== Spirituality Units ===
1. UKM Islam
2. UKM Catholic Lumen Cristi
3. UKM Christian Youth of Teknokrat
4. UKM Hindu
5. UKM Buddha

=== Student Art Units ===
1. UKM Dance
2. UKM Choir
3. UKM Band
4. UKM Ambassador
5. UKM T-Action

=== Sport Units ===
1. UKM Football
2. UKM Futsal
3. UKM Basketball
4. UKM Volley
5. UKM Karate
6. UKM Pencak Silat
7. UKM Badminton
8. UKM Taekwondo
9. UKM Student Regiment

== Facilities ==
=== Language Laboratory ===
There are two language laboratories. These laboratories are equipped with Multimedia computers and LED TV 60 and 70-inch. In addition, the language laboratory has been equipped with a set of electronic equipment, audio video consisting of instructor console as the main engine, equipped with a repeater language learning machine, tape recorder, DVD player, video monitors, headsets, and 40 students booth installed with a set of computer and screen in a single space. There are also components of a multimedia computer that can be used as additional components, which are combined with all of them. If this is done, then the language laboratory also serves as a multimedia language laboratory.

=== Library ===
Teknokrat has a library which provides a complete collection consisting of books, theses, scientific papers of lecturers, scientific journals, popular magazines, newspapers, dictionaries, encyclopedias, and handbooks. There is also a collection of theses from the field of informatics and languages.

=== Auditorium ===
There is an auditorium which is used for seminars, workshops, meetings, training, art activities, and others. The auditorium has a capacity of 700 people.

=== Indoor Stadium ===
Teknokrat has an indoor stadium with 1500 capacity of people, which functions as an auditorium for sports activities (basketball, futsal, volleyball, and badminton), educational activities (seminars, general stadium, training, English and art contests), and college activities (propti, yudisium, art event)
