= Wilga Rivers =

Academic and writer from Australia

Wilga Marie Rivers (13 April 1919 – 23 June 2007) was an Australian linguist and Professor of Romance Languages. While she taught at both the secondary-education and college level throughout her life, she spent the majority of her career on the faculty of Harvard University. There, she served as a professor of Romance Languages and Coordinator of Language Instruction in Romance Languages, fulfilling these roles until her eventual retirement in 1989.

Rivers was best known for her work in the field of foreign language acquisition and foreign language pedagogy, promoting and popularizing a number of methods used in modern language teaching. In opposition to the popular audiolingualism in her contemporary era, Rivers advocated for a shift towards an interactive and communication-based method of language teaching. She also promoted the use of technology and integration of psychology in language teaching, stances that were not widespread at the time.

== Biography ==
Wilga Rivers was born on 13 April 1919 in Melbourne, Australia. Her impoverished working-class family was of mixed European heritage: her father was of British descent while her mother was of German. She and her family spent her childhood in the Melbourne suburbs. Rivers stayed in Australia for the majority of her early life and education. She attended public school for both her primary and secondary education. During this time, she became fascinated with the French language. This fascination spurred a desire in her to master the French language and become a French teacher.

Following her primary and secondary education, Rivers attended the University of Melbourne with a scholarship and graduated with a Bachelor of Arts honors degree in 1939. Now able to teach, she spent the next few years teaching various subjects in a number of high schools in Australia. She was still determined to become a language teacher and kept up with her studies when she was off work. In 1949, she graduated from the University of Melbourne once again with a master's degree, and soon after moved to England to pursue her dream of teaching French. She spent three years teaching in England, before returning to Australia to teach for 5 more years. She moved to the United States in 1959 in pursuit of continuing her education, graduating with a doctorate in 1962 from the University of Illinois. During her time studying there, she also served as a teaching assistant in the French department. In 1964, she returned to Australia and took up a position in the French department in Monash University in Melbourne.

Rivers’ first book The Psychologist and the Foreign Language Teacher, published in 1964, became a popular topic in the linguistic community following its publication. The success of the book bolstered her international reputation, leading her to be widely sought for teaching positions in the United States. She latched onto this opportunity in 1971, accepting a position as a professor of French at the University of Illinois. It was there that she began sculpting her own method of language teaching that she became so renowned for. A few years later, in 1973, she received the opportunity to become the Coordinator of the Romance Language program and a full-time professor in the Department of Roman Languages at Harvard University, becoming the first woman to hold those positions. She spent the rest of her career at Harvard, and continued to push her ideas of language pedagogy forward. Even after her retirement in 1989, she continued her work in foreign language teaching and pushed her international reputation further. She spent the rest of her life in the Massachusetts area, dying in Watertown on 23 June 2007.

== Language acquisition ==
At the start of Rivers’ career, the primary method of foreign language teaching was audiolingualism, a strategy that puts heavy emphasis on memorizing the phonology and grammar of the language. Rivers was largely in opposition of this pedagogical method; she instead promoted a teaching method focusing on interaction and communicative discourse. Her model divides language teaching into two parts: acquisition of language skills and use of language skills. Rivers believed that audiolingualism invested too much into acquisition of skills, leaving students relatively inexperienced in the practical use of the language they were learning. To counteract this, she suggested that more interactive and realistic language scenarios should be implemented into language teaching to help students practice how the language functions in normal discourse.

To demonstrate this, Rivers presents a model that divides language education into two categories: "skill-getting" and "skill-using." Skill-getting itself encompasses two parts. The first, cognition, is facilitated through perception, the understanding of "units, categories, and functions" of the language, and abstraction, the "internalizing of the rules relating these categories and functions." Mastery of this type of language knowledge leads the student towards the other part of skill-getting: production. Primarily called pseudo-communication by Rivers, the stage of production includes the proper articulation of the language and the ability to construct "comprehensible foreign language sequences by rapid associations of learned elements." Production is most commonly facilitated through classroom drills and exercises. Rivers asserts that almost all language instruction never develops students’ language skills beyond pseudo-communication. Drills condition students to produce basic sentence structures, but are unable to help students produce genuine communication. As a result, she insists language educators need to facilitate their students’ skill-using, best cultivated through interaction and communication. However, she does concede that drills are effective in helping students acquire knowledge of a language, and can be helpful with some aspects of more advanced language skills such as semantic relationships.

To supplement the already-established "skill-getting" drills, Rivers suggested that students undergo exercises in which they are thrust into a situation with a simulated monolingual environment of the language they are learning. She drew on a study by linguist Sandra Savignon conducted on French students to support her claims. These students, who had regular conversations with French native-speakers in French implemented into their studies, reported that they felt more confident in their speaking abilities in the language since they had practice using it in natural conversation. Rivers believed that this was sufficient evidence for the importance of communication in language study. She also asserted that students should ideally be given the option to choose their preference of study, whether it be pair work, group work, or solo work. She reasoned that forcing students to work in an uncomfortable arrangement may take away their motivation to explore their language abilities, and thereby inhibit their intellectual growth. Additional exercises and activities that she suggested are active problem solving using the language, sharing background, interests, and other personally relevant information in the foreign language, and learning to do an activity with all instruction in the foreign language.

=== Movement towards student-focused curricula ===
Rivers also advocated that foreign language pedagogy be structured based on the preferences of the students, a stance in opposition of the traditional system of extensive grammar and writing of language. She reasoned that students would be more encouraged to engage in language learning if the instruction matched their own interests. To support her claim, she analyzed and released the results of a survey that she conducted at the University of Illinois at Urbana in her 1973 article The Non-Major: Tailoring the Course to Fit the Person--Not the Image. This survey, distributed to language students of the university's College of Liberal Arts and Sciences, aimed to determine what students desired in their language courses and see if their preferences were already reflected in their classes. The survey produced 1500 responses, a number which Rivers further divided based on proficiency level (elementary, intermediate, advanced). Through analyzing the data, Rivers found that 63% of elementary and intermediate level language students desired more discourse and communication exercises in their curriculum, and 62% wanted more reading. Furthermore, two-thirds of this number specifically wanted these readings to be newspapers and magazines in the language of their study. The survey also showed that there was very little interest among students for courses to contain more grammar and writing exercises. Based on these results, Rivers concluded that foreign language students were much more interested in the applications of the languages they were learning, their use in communication, discussion of current events, and media being primary areas of interest. The data supported Rivers’ claims that interaction is key for language pedagogy and encourages students to engage with language more than grammar-based practices.

== Psychology in language teaching ==
Rivers was also a vocal advocate for the intermingling of psychology and foreign language teaching. She specifically highlighted the importance of cognitive psychology in foreign and second language acquisition. She studied data from both linguistic and psychological studies to determine what teaching methods best supported the cognitive faculties of adult language learners and helped facilitate their acquisition of a foreign language.

=== Language and mental representations ===
Rivers denoted a student's mental representation of language as an important psychological faculty linked to successful language acquisition. She makes specific reference to three systems of cognition identified by American psychologist Jerome Bruner. These three systems are classified as enactive, iconic, and symbolic. Rivers’ research showed that each of these three cognitive systems were nurtured with different modalities of instruction for language acquisition. She expressed that all three of these systems need to be developed simultaneously in order for students to acquire language effectively.

The first system, enactive, is facilitated through stimulus-response conditioning. Through repeated stimulus-response conditioning, language students pick up on patterns in language, which allow them to produce quick responses to basic language structures. However, since this system is fostered almost solely through stimulus-response conditioning, it has the most limited faculties of the three.

The second system of mental representation is iconic. This system is facilitated through perceptual organization and imagery. As such, Rivers denotes that both auditory and visual stimuli are important for building the iconic system. The development of recognizing auditory and visual language cues is also helpful in fortifying memorization of a language. However, perception of auditory cues can vary both between different students and within individual students themselves based on the environment. Rivers notes that an embarrassed student may be unable to identify auditory patterns and cues, and may develop a negative response to the patterns as a result. Since the ability to identify specific auditory cues is important to language acquisition, Rivers stresses that instructors should be ready to accommodate variations in a student's attitude toward language in order to help them learn in a way that best suits them.

The third system, symbolic, absorbs the processes and features of language and formulates them into linguistic concepts for the language learner. Rivers describes this system as being responsible for the development and comprehension of linguistic hierarchies and rules. She states that the easiest way to facilitate this cognitive system is for instructors to provide explanations for new language concepts and rules that students may not be familiar with. With this guidance, students are able to better understand the rules and patterns of the language on their own, and can apply that knowledge of previous examples to create their own responses in different circumstances.

In her later work on the relationship between cognitive psychology and language acquisition, Rivers’ studies further showed that a student's understanding of how to learn and use language greatly affected their ability to learn a new language. In her 1991 article Mental representations and language in action, River's research showed that multilingual learners were able to memorize a new language's vocabulary much faster than monolingual learners. This was because the multilingual speakers had already determined a method of acquiring new vocabulary that best served their cognitive preferences. The monolingual learners, on the other hand, still needed to devise a strategy that suited their own preferences. In a similar fashion, Rivers’ research also demonstrated that students were faster in memorizing and accessing memorized language material if that material was related to their own interests and needs. Rivers claimed that active use of language is one of the best ways to foster a student's understanding of the language they are learning. Students demonstrated that they were able to access words and syntactic structures that concerned their interests and habits more quickly because they used them more often. As a result of these findings, Rivers advocated that students should be encouraged to choose and acquire vocabulary that suits their interests, as they would learn the material at a faster pace.

== Technology in language teaching ==
Rivers also distinguished herself as an avid supporter of using technology and language learning laboratories (LLLs) in conjunction with language teaching. Language labs first began appearing in the late 1920s and early 1930s, providing a new service for students learning foreign languages. In the 1950s, however, a mass outcry from students concerning their distaste of language laboratories caused language teachers to step back and reassess whether LLLs were ultimately beneficial to language teaching. Rivers presented her own opinions on the issue in two articles published in the 1982 and 1990: LLLs had the potential to be a major benefit to language, but the way they were currently being used was detrimental to student. In her 1982 article Understanding the learner in the language laboratory, Rivers targeted three different areas that she believed needed reassessment in order for LLLs to be effective: Language Learning, Language Teaching, and the LLL Director and Instructor.

=== Language learning ===
Rivers distinguished language learning as the students’ side of the language acquisition process. She noted that all students have preferred methods of instruction in language learning that help them acquire information easier. For example, while most methods of language teaching consisted solely of auditory stimuli, many students were able to absorb and assess information more easily through visual stimuli. Rivers also noted that the traditional practice of priming students to quickly produce near-automated responses is not effective for every student; many students demonstrate more accurate response when given time to think and reason with the material. With these differences in mind, drills and practices used in LLLs required revisions in order for students to see them as an aid to their studies, not an obstacle.

=== Language teaching ===
Rivers distinguished language teaching as the teachers’ side of the language acquisition process. She specifically addressed the contemporary methods of teaching and curricula used in language teaching by many language teachers. At the time, the common practice of language teaching was a linear approach, from listening to speaking to reading to writing. The first two were generally isolated to the LLL and the latter two to the classroom. Rivers noted that this practice was outdated, as many students demonstrated that intermingling these four processes, such as using writing in conjunction with listening and speaking, helped them in learning the material. She also promoted a transition away from the traditional structural syllabus (syllabi designed to introduce grammar first and build up to speech) towards functional syllabi (designed to demonstrate the functionality of the language such as communication) or experimental syllabi (designed to impart as much authentic use of language on students as possible). In order to support these teaching strategies, Rivers suggested that the materials in LLLs should be changed in favor of more natural speech materials, such as videos of native speakers conversing and films in different languages.

=== LLL director and instructor ===
Rivers also identified LLL instructors and directors as primary reasons for students’ pushback against LLLs. She states that as technology evolved, many LLL instructors didn't take the time to learn how to employ new materials in their curriculums. As such, the full potential of LLLs were unrealized, and thus students could only learn through older methods of teaching. To combat this complacency, Rivers urged LLL instructors to assure that they had the most up-to-date materials at their disposal, and that every instructor took the time to understand the new technology available to them so that students could best benefit from LLLs.

=== Reception ===
Rivers’ stance on the use of technology in language teaching was initially met with some opposition. In 1991, linguists James Pusack and Sue Otto published an article that regarded Rivers’ models of fully integrating LLLs with reluctance. The artificiality of technology at the time was one point of concern that they pointed out. As language programs began to be popularized in the 1980s, many scholars were skeptical of their ability to produce language in a way that seemed natural. The limited inputs and outputs of programs such as these also posed an issue, as the number of responses and simulations a program would have was finite. The two also claimed that Rivers gave too much credit to technology. They argued that Rivers focuses too much on the need to understand the technology and materials used in LLLs, and doesn't emphasize enough the importance of an instructor working in tandem with technology in order for it to be effective. Pusack and Otto also asserted that with the current technology, it would be far too difficult to create a completely tailored, individualized teaching strategy for each student as Rivers promoted.

== Legacy ==
Wilga Rivers and her work in linguistics is still honored through a couple of awards created after her death. The American Association for Applied Linguistics (AAAL) honors her legacy with the Wilga Rivers Graduate Student Award, an annual merit-based award given to graduate student members of the AAAL. The American Council on the Teaching of Foreign Languages (ACTFL) also honors her impact on language education with The ACTFL Wilga Rivers Award for Leadership in World Language Education, awarded to annually to a member of the ACTFL that demonstrates active participation in a number of language organizations and committees.
