= Luigi Miraglia =

Italian Latinist and classicist

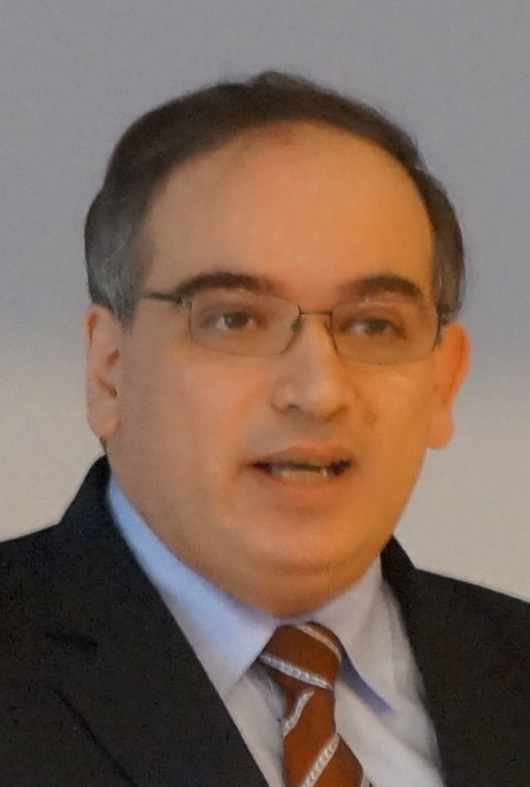
- Miraglia in 2016
- Born: Luigi Miraglia; 28 October 1965 (age 60); Naples, Italy
- Education: University of Naples Federico II (laurea); University of Salerno (PhD)
- Occupations: Latinist, Classicist, philologist, educator
- Known for: Founding and managing the Accademia Vivarium Novum
- Notable work: Fabulae Syrae; Italian editions of Lingua Latina per se illustrata and Athènaze; Vita moresque

Luigi Miraglia (born 28 October 1965) (Latin: Aloisius Miraglia) is an Italian Latinist and classicist. He is a proponent of Hans Ørberg's natural method of language learning and the founder of the Accademia Vivarium Novum.

== Personal life ==
Miraglia is a grandson of the nineteenth century Italian jurist and politician Luigi Miraglia. Miraglia attended the Classical Lyceum Umberto I in Naples, afterwards studying at the University of Naples Federico II and University of Salerno.

He became known for owning a large personal library of over 16,000 volumes, predominantly in Latin.

Miraglia has never married and has no children. He describes the students at the academy as his family.

== Career ==
In 1989, he became the director of the journal Il trifoglio, and in 1989 became a didactic consultant at the European Language Institute in Recanati. Since 1996, he has been the director of the Accademia Vivarium Novum, first in Montella and, since 2009, in Rome. During the 2009–2010 academic year, he taught "Elements of Latin Conversation and Composition and Living Latinity" at the Pontifical Superior Institute for Latin (Latin: Pontificium Institutum Altioris Latinitatis), followed by courses on "Medieval Latin Literature" and "Internship to Classical Language Teachers". Since 2011, he has been a member of the Academia Latinitati Fovendae; since 2012, he has been a member of the Pontifical Academy for Latin.

== See also ==
- Accademia Vivarium Novum
- Hans Ørberg
- Direct method
- Latin literature
- Linguistics
