= Hans Ørberg =

Danish linguist and teacher (1920–2010)

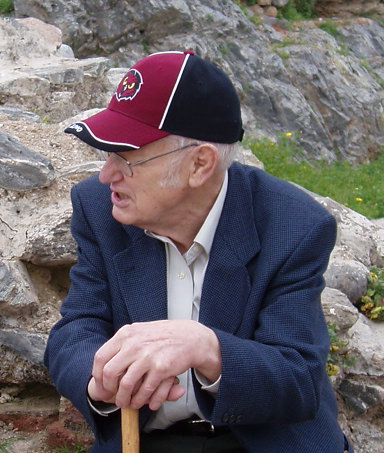
- Born: 21 April 1920
- Died: 17 February 2010 (aged 89)

Academic background
- Education: University of Copenhagen

Academic work
- Discipline: Latin linguistics
- Notable works: LINGVA LATINA PER SE ILLVSTRATA

Hans Henning Ørberg (21 April 1920 – 17 February 2010, sometimes written as Oerberg) was a Danish linguist and teacher. He received a master's degree in English, French, and Latin at the University of Copenhagen and taught these languages in many Danish high schools until 1963 and then taught in a Danish Gymnasium until 1988. He was the author of Lingua Latina per se illustrata, (Note: lit. 'The Latin language illustrated through itself') a widely used method for learning Latin through the natural method.

== Career ==
From 1953 to 1961, Ørberg worked in the Naturmetodens Sproginstitut, (Note: The nature method institute) an institute where languages are taught according to the "natural method" of learning. While there he created a new course in Latin: LINGUA LATINA SECUNDUM NATURAE RATIONEM EXPLICATA (Note: The Latin language explained by natural method) published in 1955. Besides the author's name, there are no non-Latin words in the book. The book has been revised a few times, including in 1983 and 1991; the title was also changed, to LINGVA LATINA PER SE ILLVSTRATA. In his retirement, Ørberg directed the Domus Latina (Note: Latin House) publishing house and gave lectures in European countries and the United States on the natural method.

=== LINGVA LATINA PER SE ILLVSTRATA ===
Ørberg's LINGVA LATINA PER SE ILLVSTRATA is based on the natural method, or contextual induction. In this method, the student, who needs no previous knowledge of Latin, begins with simple sentences, such as Rōma in Italiā est ("Rome is in Italy"). Words are always introduced in a context that reveals the meaning behind them, or they are explained in the margins of the text with images, Latin synonyms or antonyms, or short Latin definitions. Grammar is gradually made more complex until the student is reading unadapted Latin texts. Unusual for a Latin course, pronunciation and understanding, rather than translation, are stressed. A dictionary is not necessary in this system; because the textbooks are composed entirely in Latin, they can be used by speakers of many languages. The student is assumed to know the Latin alphabet and be familiar with a Romance language or English. The course consists of two parts: FAMILIA ROMANA (Note: Roman Family) and ROMA AETERNA, (Note: Eternal Rome) along with a series of classic texts like Julius Caesar's Commentāriī dē Bellō Gallicō. (Note: Commentaries about the Gallic War) Using illustrations and modifications, these texts can be understood through context and by reference to words already learned.

Chapters consist of an illustrated and annotated reading followed by a concise and formal discussion of the grammar used in the chapter, as well as several Pēnsa, or exercises, that require the student to apply these grammatical concepts to selections from the chapter's reading. These exercises ask the student to manipulate the grammar of Latin sentences rather than to translate. Even the grammar discussions are entirely in Latin, grammatical terminology being introduced as necessary. The book also uses macrons throughout. This enables readers to internalize and learn proper phonemic vowel length, which is essential to maximum understanding of the sounds of the Latin language.

== Personal life ==
Hans Henning Ørberg was born on April 21, 1920 in Store Andst, Denmark.

Ørberg was married and had several children including Anders Ørberg, Jens Ørberg, and Trine Ørberg.

He died on February 17, 2010 in Grenaa at the age of 89. His children continue to run Domus Latina after his death.

== Bibliography ==
- (1955–1957). Lingua Latina secundum naturae rationem explicata. First published in fascicles; later revised.
- (1965). Lingua Latina secundum naturae rationem explicata.
- (1983; revised 1990–1991). Lingua Latina per se illustrata. Pars I. Familia Romana et Pars II. Roma aeterna
- Colloquia Personarum (supplementary dialogues).
- Exercitia Latina I and related exercise books.
- Latin–English Vocabulary

== See also ==
- Latin language
- Latin literature
- Linguistics
- Natural method
- Luigi Miraglia
- Accademia Vivarium Novum
- Lingua Latina per se illustrata
