= Bilingual method =

Teaching Method

The bilingual method of foreign language teaching was developed by C.J. Dodson (1967) as a counterpart of the audiovisual method. In both methods the preferred basic texts are dialogues accompanied by a picture strip. The bilingual method, however, advocates two revolutionary principles based on the results of scientifically controlled experiments in primary and secondary schools.

In contrast to the audiovisual method and the direct method, the printed text is made available from the very beginning and presented simultaneously with the spoken sentence to allow learners to see the shape of individual words. Also, from the outset meanings are conveyed bilingually as utterance equivalents in the manner of the sandwich technique, thus avoiding meaningless and hence tedious parroting of the learning input. The pictures are seen primarily as an aid to recall and practice of the related dialogue sentences rather than as conveyors of meaning. The mother tongue is again used in the oral manipulation of grammatical structures, i.e. in bilingual pattern drills.

== Structure ==
The architecture of the bilingual method is best understood as a traditional three-phase structure of presentation – practice – production. A lesson cycle starts out with the reproduction of a dialogue, moves on to the oral variation and recombination of the dialogue sentences, and ends up with an extended application stage reserved for message-oriented communication. The method is listed in Eppert's Lexikon (1973) under the headword Konversation, where its eight teaching steps are described as, "The eight steps lead from imitation to free conversation," i.e. unlike the grammar-translation method, but like the direct method and the audio-lingual method it focuses on the development of oral skills.

== Classroom research ==
Dodson's experimental data – several modes of presenting dialogues were tested – have been confirmed by subsequent research, for example by a school-year long experiment of teaching French to Dutch learners, which compared the bilingual method with an audiovisual approach. A laboratory study with Japanese learners of English also confirmed Dodson's results. Similar results were reported by Sastri (1970) and Walatara (1973). Feasibility studies were undertaken by Kaczmarski in Poland, by Wolfgang Butzkamm for the teaching of English to German speakers in secondary schools, by Kasjan for the teaching of German to Japanese learners at university level, and by Moorfield (2008) for the teaching of the Maori language.

== History ==
Although Dodson's work inspired researchers from various countries, the bilingual method has been neglected by the mainstream, as evidenced in the absence of any mother tongue role in recognised overviews of L2 approaches and methods such as Richards & Rodgers (1987). However, Butzkamm & Caldwell (2009) have taken up Dodson's seminal ideas and called for a paradigm shift in foreign language teaching. This call was repeated by Hall & Cook in their state-of-the-art article in 2012: "The way is open for a major paradigm shift in language teaching and learning".

== Principles ==
- The understanding of words and sentences in foreign languages can be made easier by the use of mother tongue.
- There is no need to create artificial situations for explaining the meaning of words and sentences of the target language.
- The Bilingual Method is a combination of the Direct Method and the Grammar Translation Method.

== Advantages ==
=== Students become functional bilinguals ===
When the students aim to become fully bilingual in terms of language learning, this method is considered to be the appropriate one. When the students begin with the language learning process, their success in the learning depends upon the competence and confidence of their language teacher. As she moves from L1 to L2, the students imitate her and learn.

=== Never miss out on a lesson ===
According to this method, acquisition of the mother tongue is very important for the language learning process. When the mother tongue is firmly established in the minds of the students, by the age of 7 or 8, it becomes easy to learn difficult words and grammar. Thus, this method helps to save time by not creating artificial situations unnecessarily to explain or convey meanings in English.

=== It gives importance to other languages ===
In this method, importance is given to the mother tongue and its culture. Thus it does not lead to substitution of one means of communication for another.

=== Accessibility ===
This method of language learning ensures accessibility. When students start learning a language using this method, they find a level of familiarity. Through the use of the mother tongue, the teacher ensures that the learning is happening.

=== Discipline ===
Many new English language teachers face difficulty handling students and making them feel as comfortable as with a local teacher. Learning the local language is considered a sure way to improve behavior management skills. It also helps in delivering instructions related to lesson activities. If the concepts are explained in students' L1, then the new learners of the English language will be able to grasp more knowledge about grammar and vocabulary. Thus, it helps the students to be more efficient and faster.

=== It's the teacher's tool ===
In the bilingual method, as the native language is used in the classroom, it is predominantly the teacher who makes use of L1. The students will not be using their native tongue much in the classroom.

=== Strong reading foundation ===
The bilingual method uses written form of the language which allows students learn the shapes of the words as they repeat the words orally.

== Disadvantages ==
- If the teacher fails to carry out this method properly, then it can degenerate into pure translation method.
- This method can confuse the learner while contrasting the features of two languages.
- The teacher must be fluent in both the languages in order to make the concepts clear.
- Students may develop dependency on their mother tongue.
- Slows down learning process and takes longer time to learn and be proficient in the target language.
