= Direct method =

Direct method may refer to

- Direct method (education) for learning a foreign language
- Direct method (computational mathematics) as opposed to iterative method
- Direct methods (crystallography) for estimating the phases of the Fourier transform of the scattering density from the corresponding magnitudes, mainly using X-rays
- Direct methods (electron microscopy) ways to estimate the phase and find atomic positions using electron diffraction
- Direct method in calculus of variations for constructing a proof of the existence of a minimizer for a given functional
- Direct method (accounting) as opposed to indirect method for calculating cash flows
