= Mother tongue mirroring =

Mother tongue mirroring is the adaptation of word-for-word translation in language education. The aim is to make foreign constructions salient and transparent to learners and, in many cases, spare them the technical jargon of grammatical analysis. It differs from literal translation and interlinear text as used in the past, since it takes the progress learners have made into account and only focuses upon one specific structure at a time. As a didactic device, it can only be used to the extent that it remains intelligible to the learner, unless it is combined with a normal idiomatic translation.

== Examples ==
=== Compound words ===
Compounds can be broken down into their component parts to help learners understand their logic. For example, in German:

Target vocabulary	Idiomatic translation	Literal translation
Handschuh	glove	hand shoe
Zahnarzt	dentist	tooth doctor
Faustregel	rule of thumb	fist rule
Lehnwort	loanword	

So 'loanword' is originally an exact copy of the German compound, or calque. The term 'mother tongue mirroring' can itself be regarded as a calque from German, because it is originally a translation of 'muttersprachliche Spiegelung'.

=== Idioms and proverbs ===
Over and above knowing what idioms actually mean in order to use them properly, learners want to know how they come to mean what they mean. In another example from German:

Target vocabulary	Idiomatic translation	Literal translation
Kopf und Kragen riskieren	stick one's neck out	risk head and collar
etwas auf eigene Faust tun	act on one's own authority	do something on one's own fist
die Hände in den Schoß legen	rest on one's oars	put the hands in the lap

=== Pragmatic formulas ===
In French:

Target vocabulary	Idiomatic translation	Literal translation
s’il vous plaît	please	if it to-you pleases

In Turkish:

Target vocabulary	Idiomatic translation	Literal translation
teşekkür ederim	thank you	thanks make-I

In Armenian:

Target vocabulary	Idiomatic translation	Literal translation
շնորհակալ եմ (shnorhak'al em)	thank you	thankful I-am

=== Collocations ===
In German:

Target vocabulary	Idiomatic translation	Literal translation
Ein starker Raucher	a heavy smoker	a strong smoker
eine Drohung wahrmachen	fulfill a threat	make a threat true
eine Familie gründen	start a family	ground a family

=== Syntax ===
Mother tongue mirroring is most helpful for discovering the hidden anatomy of foreign grammars, especially of non-related languages. In Mandarin:

Target vocabulary	Idiomatic translation	Literal translation
Hǎo bù hǎo? (好不好?)	Is it good?	Good/not good?
Nán bù nán? (难不难?)	Is it difficult?	Difficult/not difficult?

Untranslatable particles such as Mandarin le (了), meaning 'temporary change of state or situation', are simply inserted in the mirrored version:

Target vocabulary	Idiomatic translation	Literal translation
Wǒ è le (我饿了).	I'm hungry.	I - hungry le.
Wǒ bǎo le (我饱了).	I'm full (up).	I - full le.

For more Chinese constructions mirrored in English see Wu.

=== Generative principle ===
Making a structure transparent is not an aim in itself but serves the ultimate aim of enabling the learner, in Wilhelm von Humboldt's words, to make infinite use of finite means (“von endlichen Mitteln unendlichen Gebrauch machen”). In foreign language teaching, this basic human capacity is captured by the generative principle.

In “The awful German language” Mark Twain humorously explained the difficulties of German syntax and morphology by mirroring long sentences in English. Although the main intent is satirical rather than didactic, Twain provides interesting insights into the workings of the German language.

Mirroring is amply used in commercial phrasebooks and computer courses and is a common device in scientific grammars of remote languages, but has been ignored by modern coursebook authors, along with other bilingual techniques such as the sandwich technique, presumably because of the mother tongue taboo, still prevailing in mainstream language teaching methodology. According to Butzkamm & Caldwell, mother tongue mirroring should be re-instated as a central teaching technique, especially when learners are not ready for grammatical analysis. It is analysis by analogy. It is foreign grammar in native words.

== See also ==
- Kanbun
