= Eclectic shorthand =

English shorthand system invented by J. G. Cross in 1878

Eclectic Shorthand
- Script type: Stenography - heavy line, positional alphabet
- Creator: J. G. Cross
- Period: 1878
- Languages: English

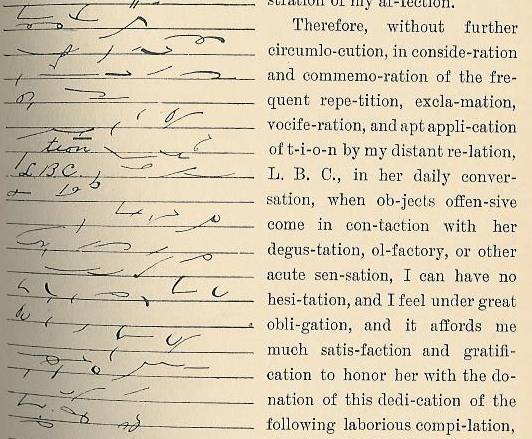
An example of eclectic shorthand. The shorthand version of the text is on the left side of the image, while the normal script is on the right. Note the succinctness of the shorthand compared to the normal text.

Eclectic shorthand (sometimes called "Cross shorthand" or "Eclectic-Cross shorthand" after its founder, J. G. Cross) is an English shorthand system of the 19th century. Although it has fallen into disuse, it is nonetheless noteworthy as one of the most compact (and complex) systems of writing ever devised.

== Overview ==
While most later responses to Pitman shorthand aimed for greater simplicity and an elimination of such characteristics as shading and positional writing (cf Gregg shorthand), Cross took his system in the opposite direction. Noting that English spelling is able to express all its many vowel sounds using only five vowel symbols, Cross adopted a five-position system for expressing vowels in his system (Pitman uses three). From there he went on to apply the five positions to consonant symbols as well, and to eliminate perpendicular strokes to make the writing more cursive. For a symbol system, the writing is based on English spelling rather than phonetics — there are symbols for q and c, for instance, and a wh symbol which is different from w (or h).

Many tricks are employed to make writing more compact: shading a vowel at the beginning of the stroke denotes that it is preceded by an r; shading the whole stroke denotes a diphthong, while shading the end of the stroke denotes a following r. An l can be indicated by making the outline of the preceding letter smaller, and a following w by deepening the curve of the preceding stroke.

All in all, the system contains far more rules than any other widespread system of English shorthand, and the resulting notes are incredibly concise. However, the amount of practice required to make use of all these techniques without hesitation while taking dictation was undoubtedly quite burdensome. In addition, the heavy use of shading, common in nineteenth century systems when ink pens were the normal instrument of writing and the notion of thin and thick strokes was familiar to those accustomed to the copperplate script of the time, became difficult and counterintuitive in the 20th century. In sum, the system's complexity and the great investment of time that would have been needed to master it were most likely the causes for its downfall.

An interesting experiment used by Cross was to use paper with slightly curved lines for note-taking, on the assertion that as the hand could move more naturally in an arc across the page than in a straight line; this would improve speed.
