= Angelicals =

The Angelicals were an Augustinian order of nuns that were active in Italy from the sixteenth to the nineteenth century.

== See also ==
- Guastallines
