= Audio-lingual method =

Method of teaching foreign languages

The audio-lingual method or Army Method is a method used in teaching foreign languages. It is based on behaviorist theory, which postulates that certain traits of living things, and in this case humans, could be trained through a system of reinforcement. The correct use of a trait would receive positive, while incorrect use of that trait would receive negative feedback.

This approach to language learning was similar to another, earlier method called the direct method. Like the direct method, the audio-lingual method advised that students should be taught a language directly, using the students' native language to explain new words or grammar in target language. However, unlike the direct method, the audio-lingual method did not focus on teaching vocabulary. Rather, the teacher drilled students in the use of grammar.

Applied to language instruction, and often within the context of the language lab, it means that the instructor would present the correct model of a sentence and the students would have to repeat it. The teacher would then continue by presenting new words for the students to sample in the same structure. In audio-lingualism, there is no explicit grammar instruction: everything is simply memorized in form.

The idea is for the students to practice the particular construct until they can use it spontaneously. The lessons are built on static drills in which the students have little or no control on their own output; the teacher is expecting a particular response and not providing the desired response will result in a student receiving negative feedback. This type of activity, for the foundation of language learning, is in direct opposition with communicative language teaching.

Charles Carpenter Fries, the director of the English Language Institute at the University of Michigan, the first of its kind in the United States, believed that learning structure or grammar was the starting point for the student. In other words, it was the students' job to recite the basic sentence patterns and grammatical structures. The students were given only “enough vocabulary to make such drills possible.” (Richards, J.C. et-al. 1986). Fries later included principles of behavioural psychology, as developed by B.F. Skinner, into this method.

== Oral drills ==
Drills and pattern practice are typical (Richards, J.C. et al., 1986):

- Repetition: the student repeats an utterance as soon as she hears it.
- Inflection: one word in a sentence appears in another form when repeated.
- Replacement: one word is replaced by another.
- Restatement: the student rephrases an utterance.

== Examples ==
Inflection: Teacher: I ate the sandwich. Student: I ate the sandwiches.
Replacement: Teacher: He bought the car for half-price. Student: He bought it for half-price.
Restatement: Teacher: Tell me not to smoke so often. Student: Don't smoke so often!
The following example illustrates how more than one sort of drill can be incorporated into one practice session:
“Teacher: There's a cup on the table ... repeat
Students: There's a cup on the table
Teacher: Spoon
Students: There's a spoon on the table
Teacher: Book
Students: There's a book on the table
Teacher: On the chair
Students: There's a book on the chair
etc.”

== Historical roots ==
The method is the product of three historical circumstances. For its views on language, it drew on the work of American linguists such as Leonard Bloomfield. The prime concern of American linguists in the early decades of the 20th century had been to document all the indigenous languages spoken in the US. However, because of the dearth of trained native teachers who would provide a theoretical description of the native languages, linguists had to rely on observation. For the same reason, a strong focus on oral language was developed.

At the same time, behaviourist psychologists, such as B.F. Skinner, were forming the belief that all behaviour (including language) was learnt through repetition and positive or negative reinforcement. The third factor was the outbreak of World War II, which created the need to post large number of American servicemen all over the world. It was, therefore, necessary to provide these soldiers with at least basic verbal communication skills. Unsurprisingly, the new method relied on the prevailing scientific methods of the time, observation and repetition, which were also admirably suited to teaching en masse. Because of the influence of the military, early versions of the audio-lingualism came to be known as the “army method.”

== In practice ==
As mentioned, lessons in the classroom focus on the correct imitation of the teacher by the students. The students are expected to produce the correct output, but attention is also paid to correct pronunciation. Although correct grammar is expected in usage, no explicit grammatical instruction is given. Furthermore, the target language is the only language to be used in the classroom. Modern implementations are more lax on this last requirement.

== Fall from popularity ==
In the late 1950s, the theoretical underpinnings of the method were questioned by linguists, such as Noam Chomsky, who pointed out the limitations of structural linguistics. The relevance of behaviorist psychology to language learning was also questioned, most famously by Chomsky's review of B.F. Skinner's Verbal Behavior in 1959. The audio-lingual method was thus deprived of its scientific credibility and it was only a matter of time before the effectiveness of the method itself was questioned.

In 1964, Wilga Rivers released a critique of the method in her book, The Psychologist and the Foreign Language Teacher. Some of the critique, namely its contention that audiolingual methods originated from Skinnerian radical behaviorism, was shown by Peter J. Castagnaro in 2006 to be misinformed.

Philip Smith's study from 1965 to 1969, termed the Pennsylvania Project, provided significant proof that audio-lingual methods were less effective than a more traditional cognitive approach involving the learner's first language.

== In recent years ==
Despite being discredited as an effective teaching methodology in 1970, audio-lingualism continues to be used today although it is typically not used as the foundation of a course but rather has been relegated to use in individual lessons. As it continues to be used, it also continues to be criticized. As Jeremy Harmer notes, “Audio-lingual methodology seems to banish all forms of language processing that help students sort out new language information in their own minds.” As this type of lesson is very teacher-centered, it is a popular methodology for both teachers and students, perhaps for several reasons but especially because the input and output is restricted and both parties know what to expect. Some hybrid approaches have been developed, as can be seen in the textbook Japanese: The Spoken Language (1987–90), which uses repetition and drills extensively but supplements them with detailed grammar explanations in English.

Butzkamm and Caldwell have tried to revive traditional pattern practice in the form of bilingual semi-communicative drills. For them, the theoretical basis, and sufficient justification, of pattern drills is the generative principle, which refers to the human capacity to generate an infinite number of sentences from a finite grammatical competence.

== Main features ==
- Each skill (listening, speaking, reading, writing) is treated and taught separately.
- The skills of writing and reading are not neglected, but the focus throughout remains on listening and speaking.
- Dialogue is the main feature of the audio-lingual syllabus.
- Dialogues are the chief means of presenting language items. They provide learners an opportunity to practice, mimic and memorize bits of language.
- Patterns drills are used as an important technique and essential part of this method for language teaching and learning.
- The language laboratory was introduced as an important teaching aid.
- Mother tongue was not given much importance, similar to the direct method, but it was not deemphasized so rigidly..

== Techniques ==
Skills are taught in the following order: listening, speaking, reading, writing. Language is taught through dialogues with useful vocabulary and common structures of communication. Students are made to memorize the dialogue line by line. Learners mimic the teacher or a tape listening carefully to all features of the spoken target language. Pronunciation like that of native speaker is important in presenting the model. Through repetition of phrases and sentences, a dialogue is learned by the first whole class, then smaller groups and finally individual learners.

Reading and writing are introduced in the next stage. The oral lesson learned in previous class is the reading material to establish a relationship between speech and writing. All reading material is introduced as orally first. Writing, in the early stages, is confined to transcriptions of the structures and dialogues learned earlier. Once learners mastered the basic structure, they were asked to write composition reports based on the oral lesson.

== Emphasizing the audio ==
The theory emphasizes the listening-speaking-reading-writing order.

Listening is important in developing speaking proficiency and so receives particular emphasis. There are strong arguments, both physiological and psychological, for combining speaking practice with training in listening comprehension.

Speaking is effective through listening. By hearing the sounds, articulation is more accurate, with differentiation of sounds, memorization and internalization of proper auditory sounds images. Development of a feel for the new language gains interest for the language.

There has been practically no study or experiments to determine how much time should be taken between listening experience and speaking practice.

Listening comprehension is most neglected in language learning. It is generally treated as incidental to speaking rather than as a foundation for it. Texts, guides and course of study contain tests for evaluating progress in listening comprehension, but they rarely contain specific learning materials designed for the systematic development of this skill.

Here are some materials that can be adapted for improving listening comprehension:

- The dialogue should be presented as a story, in the foreign language, using simple language.
- The meaning of some of the new words and expressions that will appear in the dialogue should be explained through gestures, visual aids, synonyms, etc. The idea is to teach the content in the story.
- Different role-plays can be used to present the dialogue.
- Without stopping, the dialogue can be gone through to hear how the entire conversation sounds at normal speed.
- True and false activity can improve comprehension.
- The entire dialogue can be repeated at normal rate speed. The student can close his eyes to eliminate distractions and increase his listening concentration.
- A listening comprehension test can be given.
- Listening comprehension practice can be given using dialogues from other courses of

study or recorded materials that contain most of the language that has previously been learned by the students. The speaking practice would begin after listening comprehension. The students will be ready to speak at this time. Speaking practice can proceed according to sequence.

1. Pattern practice can be based on material taken from the dialogue.
2. Mimicking can practice the dialogue itself.
3. Performance of the dialogue in front of class and at the seats with the students changing roles and partners from time to time.
4. Dialogue can be adapted.

Memorization of techniques suggested represent an approach that will enable student to memorize larger segments at a time and perform dialogues as a whole with more confidence. In the meantime, if teachers are willing to use their imagination and experiment with new techniques, many ways can be found to emphasize the audio in the method.

== Aims ==
- Oral skills are used systematically to emphasize communication. The foreign language is taught for communication, with a view to achieve development of communication skills.
- Practice is how the learning of the language takes place. Every language skill is the total of the sets of habits that the learner is expected to acquire. Practice is central to all the contemporary foreign language teaching methods. With audio-lingual method, it is emphasized even more.
- Oral learning is emphasized. Stress is put on oral skills at the early year of the foreign language course and is continued during the later years. Oral skills remain central even when, later, reading and writing are introduced. Learners are asked to speak only what they have had a chance to listen to sufficiently. They read only the material used as part of their practice. They have to write only that which they have read. Strict order of material, in terms of the four skills, is followed.

== Advantages ==
- Listening and speaking skills are emphasized and, especially the former, rigorously developed.
- The use of visual aids is effective in vocabulary teaching.
- The method is just as functional and easy to execute for larger groups.
- Correct pronunciation and structure are emphasized and acquired.
- The learner is in a directed role; the learner has little control over the material studied or the method of study.

== Disadvantages ==
- The behaviorist approach to learning is now discredited. Many scholars have proven its weakness.
- It does not pay sufficient attention to communicative competence.
- Only language form is considered while meaning is neglected.
- Equal importance is not given to all four skills.
- It is a teacher-dominated method.
- It is a mechanical method since it demands pattern practice, drilling, and memorization over functional learning and organic usage.
- The learner is in a passive role; the learner has little control over their learning.
