= Language lab =

Audio-visual installation used in language teaching

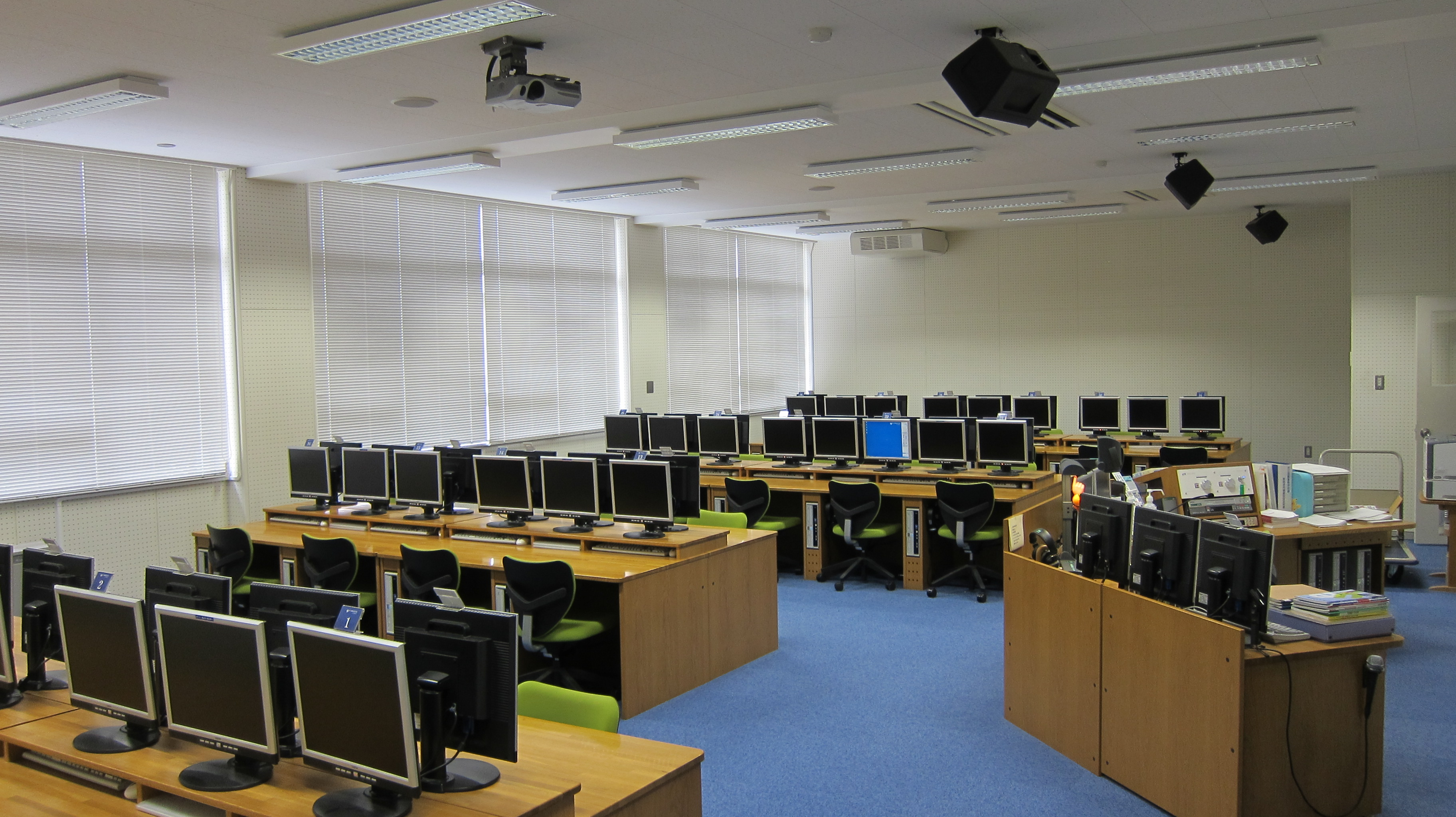
A modern language laboratory in a Japanese high school

A language laboratory (often shortened to language lab) is a dedicated space for foreign language learning where students can access audio or audio-visual materials. Typically, a teacher will listen to and manage student audio, which is delivered to individual students through headsets or in isolated sound booths. Language labs were common in schools and universities in the United States in the two decades following World War II. They have now largely been replaced by self access language learning centers, which may also be called language labs.

== History ==
Learning foreign languages grew in popularity in the 20th century in the United States. During World War II, an institute for soldiers called the Army Specialized Training Program (ASTP) was established to encouraged the learning of foreign languages. ASTP could be considered as one of the first language labs in the United States. However, during World War II, ASTP was only for members of the army, and not the average person. Additionally, the teaching methodology was different from modern standards.

The first recorded language lab was established at the University of Grenoble in 1908. Frank Chalfant brought the concept to the United States, establishing a 'phonetics lab' at Washington State University in 1911 or 1912. These early language labs used phonographs to deliver audio, and were not yet divided into individual booths.

In the 1940s, linguists at the University of Michigan developed the behaviorist audio-lingual method of foreign language learning. This method relied on repeated listening and speaking drills, which was well suited to language labs. Into the 1950s and 1960s, this method increased in popularity in the United States and Canada. By 1958, there were over 300 language labs in the US, with the majority in colleges and universities.

In 1958, the National Defense Education Act (NDEA) authorized federal financial assistance for American secondary school foreign language programs. This led to the rapid creation of new language labs. By the mid-1960s, there were an estimated 10,000 secondary-level and 4,000 post-secondary language labs in the United States. Once NDEA funding ended in 1969, the number of traditional language laboratories declined rapidly. Usage of the audio-lingual method also declined following Noam Chomsky's criticism of behaviorist models of language learning.

From the 1950s to the 1990s, most language labs used tape-based systems. Current language labs generally instead contain multimedia PCs. Modern language labs may also make use of technology like virtual reality or artificial intelligence.

== Layout ==
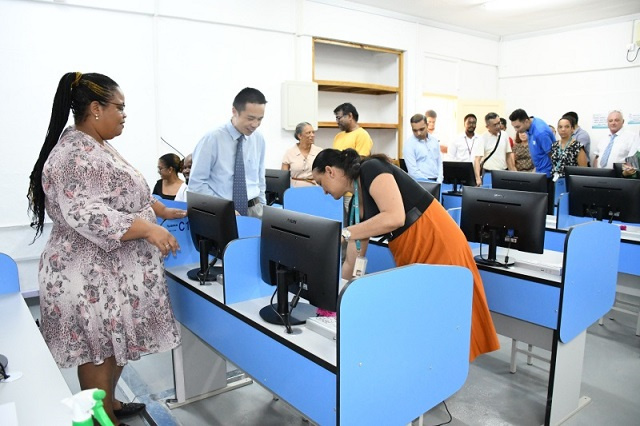
A Chinese language lab in the Seychelles

The 'traditional' language laboratory consisted of a teacher console networked to multiple stations for individual students. The teacher console typically included a tape recorder to play the instructional recording, a headset and system of switches to enable the teacher to monitor either the audio being played or an individual student, and a microphone for communicating with students. Each student station generally included a student tape recorder, headset, and microphone. The tape recorder both enabled recording of students' spoken responses and allowed them to record instructional content for later independent study.

=== Types ===
Language labs are generally divided into four types:

1. Listening type (Audio-passiveLL, referred to as A-P type). Students use earphones to listen to recorded teaching materials. It is a language laboratory with only one-way voice transmission function, also known as a listening room.
2. Listening and speaking type (Audio-Active LL, referred to as A-A type). Teachers and students have earphones and microphones, so it is a language laboratory that can carry out question-and-answer dialogues, has two-way voice transmission function, and generally has soundproof seats.
3. Hearing and contrasting (Audio-Active Comparative LL, referred to as A-A-C type). In addition to the teacher-student dialogue, students can record the recorded teaching materials broadcast by the teacher and their own oral exercises for comparison. In some listening and speaking contrast-type language laboratories, teachers can also remotely control students' tape recorders or monitor and monitor students' homework.
4. Audio-visual type (Audio Visual LL, referred to as A-V type). Visual images such as slideshows, movies, and videos can be played at the same time to create real and vivid language situations. Audiovisual language laboratories are also suitable for teaching a variety of subjects. In addition, some language laboratories, in addition to audio-visual functions, are also equipped with long-term microprocessors, which can analyze and evaluate students' homework at any time.

== Operation ==
Once the master program had been transferred onto the student recorders, the teacher would then hand over control of the decks to the students. By pressing the record key in the booth, the student would simultaneously hear the playback of the program whilst being able to record his or her voice in the pauses, using the microphone. This is known as an audio active-comparative system. From a technological point of view, this overdubbing was made possible by use of a two-channel tape recorder.

== Problems ==
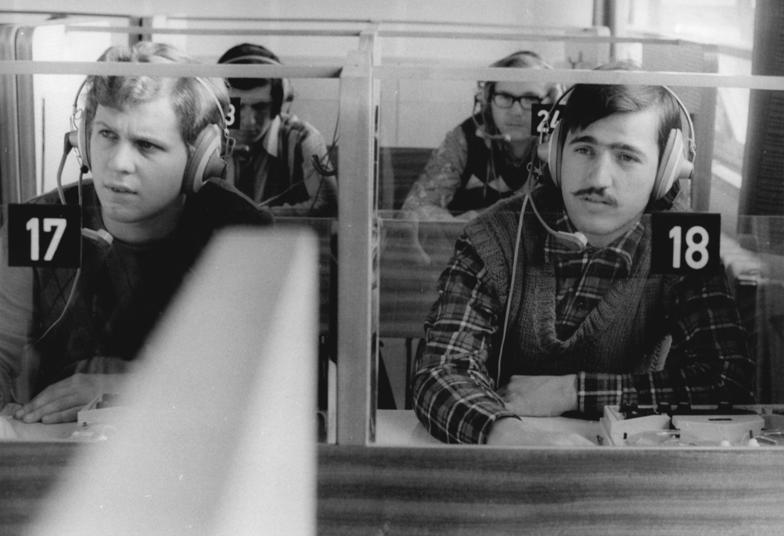
Russian language class in an East German language laboratory (1975)

Language laboratories in the 1970s and 1980s received a bad reputation due to breakdowns. Common problems stem from the limitations and relative complexity of the reel to reel tape system in use at that time. Design played a part too; the simplest language laboratories had no electronic systems in place for the teacher to remotely control the tape decks, relying on the students to operate the decks correctly. Many had no way to stop the tape running off the reel in fast rewind or forward wind, which meant time wasting and greater chances of failure through misuse.

The tape recorders in use after the early 1970s in the language laboratory were more complex, being capable of multitracking and electronic remote control. As a result, they often had several motors and relays, complex transistorised circuitry and needed a variety of voltages to run. They had many rubber parts such as idlers and drive belts which would perish and wear out. Bulbs in the control panels were also in continual need of replacement. Since the student booth tapes were not normally changed from one class to the next but were recorded over each time, these would eventually wear, and shed their oxide on the tape heads leading to poor sound and tangling.

The installations were usually maintained under contract by service engineers, but these often served a county or similar wide area, and would only call at three-monthly intervals. This meant that if several booths malfunctioned, then for much of that time the laboratory was out of action.

== Benefits ==
Language labs also have their benefits compared to traditional in-class language learning. In one study, students in foreign language classrooms were found to practice that language only 2.2% of the class time, versus 24% of the time in a language lab. Language labs have also been celebrated for their linguistic immersion, accelerated learning, and distribution of workload from the teacher.

== Change of media ==
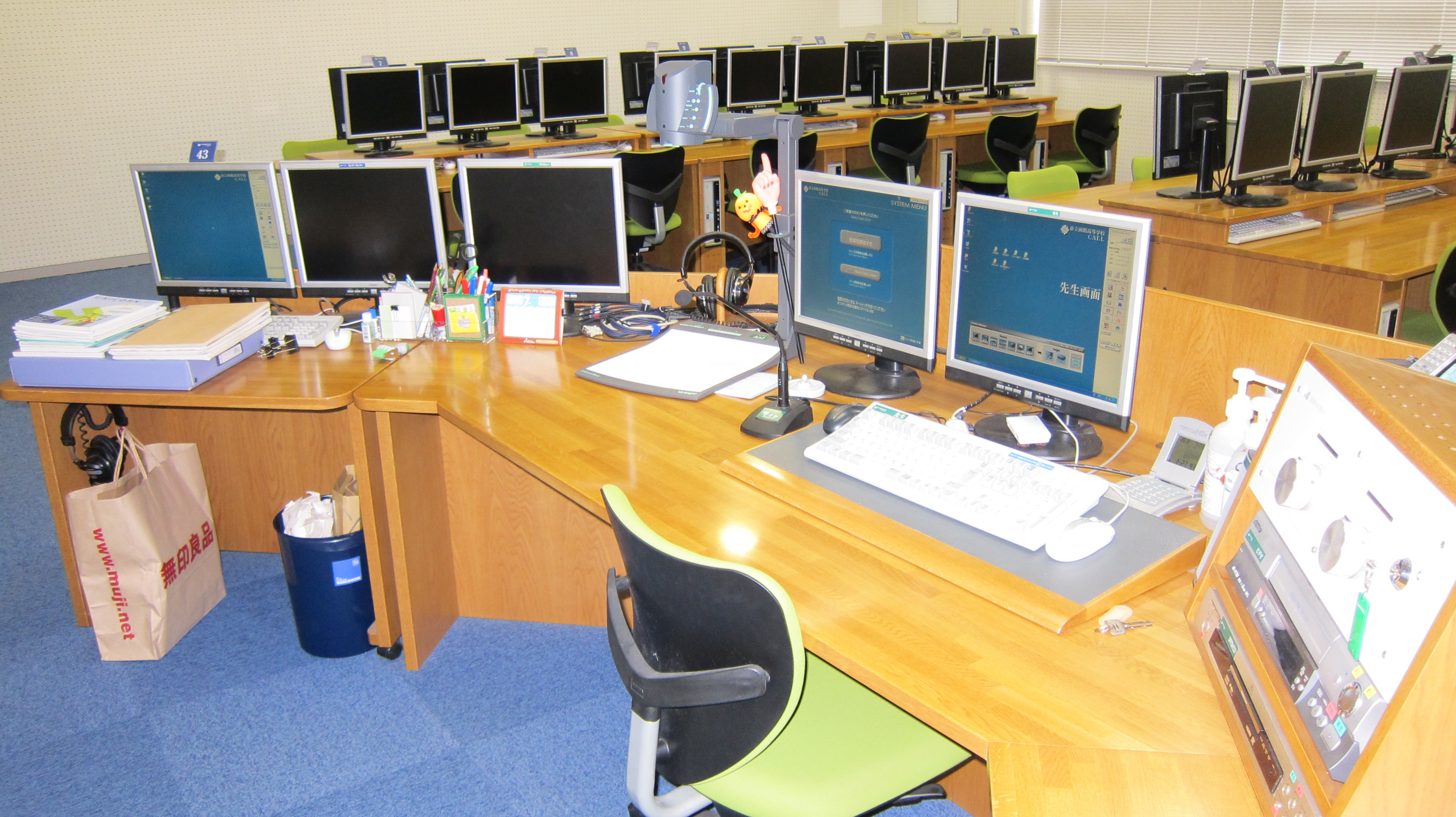
A modern language laboratory control center

]

Starting in the 1980s, many schools transformed their old language labs into computer suites. However, the advent of affordable multimedia capable PCs in the late 1990s led to a resurgence and transformation of the language laboratory with software and hard drives in place of reels of analogue tape.

In the 1990s new digital, hybrid PC based systems allowed extended functionality, in terms of better "management' of student / teacher audio with some levels of internet and video formats.

Media is 'managed' on these hybrid systems by language lab providers creating a supplementary network over and above the existing PC network for audio connections and communications in fixed locations. These hybrid systems are not without problems, mainly associated with hardware issues as the manufacturers of these hybrid systems have to replace parts and separate cabling. This both adds to the complexity of the product and has a cost implication via manufacturer annual ‘service’ fees.

== Present day ==
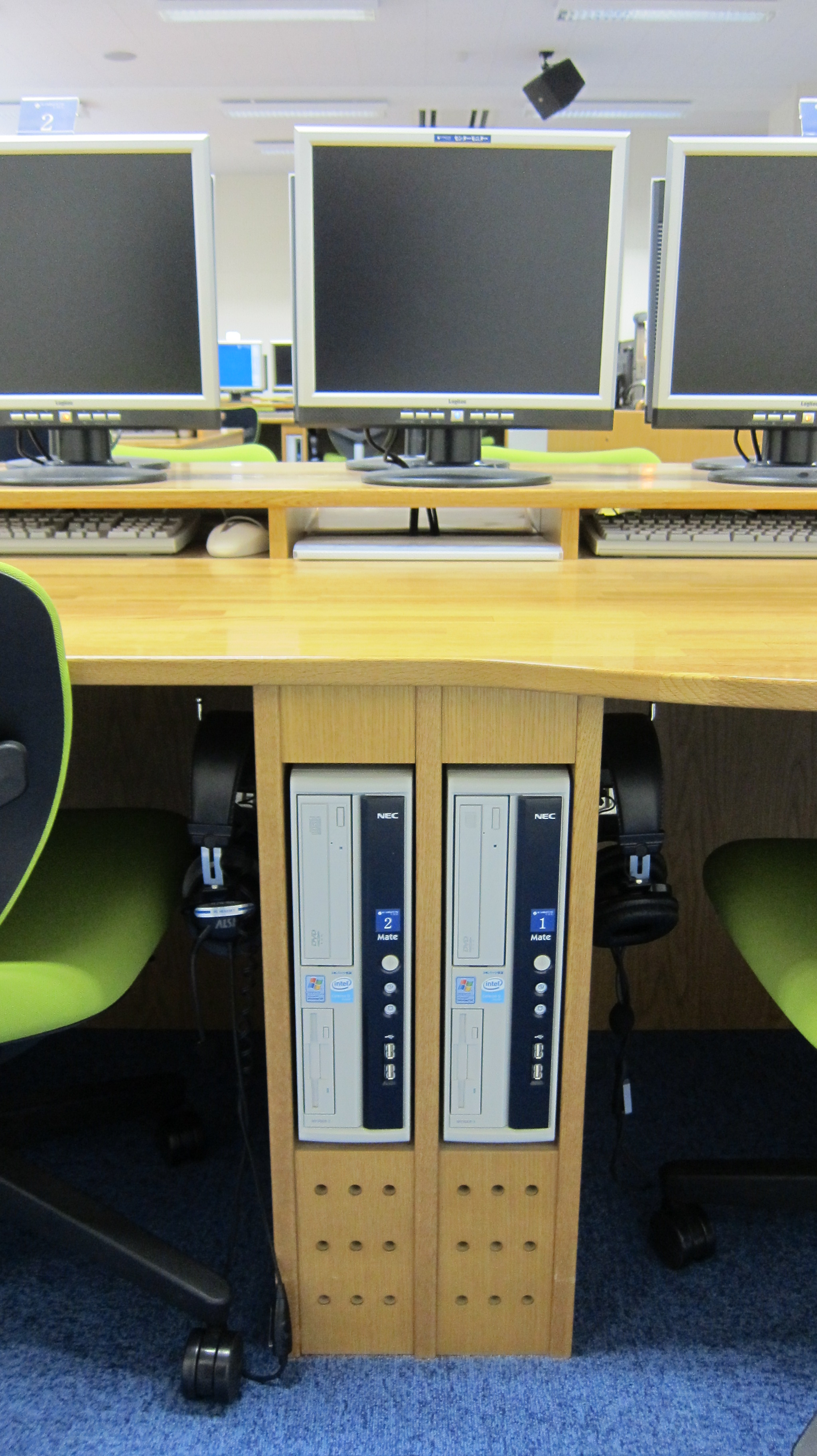
Student terminals and headphones

=== Digital language labs ===
Digital language labs, also called online language labs, are a new type of language lab format that can be accessed from any location using the internet. These labs are typically in the form of software that a student can download to their own computer. Students can complete material asynchronously or while a teacher is listening online. In some cases, students can receive feedback from artificial intelligence.

Software-only language labs challenge the concept of what a language lab is. Software can be installed and accessed on any networked PC anywhere on a school, college, or university campus. Software-only systems can be located in one room, from room-to-room or campus-to-campus. The latest form of the Digital Language was brought out in the year 2000 from India.

Software only systems can be easily installed onto an existing PC-based network, making them both multi locational in their access and much more feature rich in how and what media they manage.

The content that is now used in the new language labs is much richer and self authored or free: now not just audio, but video, flash-based games, internet etc. and the speed and variety of the delivery of media from teacher to student, student to teacher, is much quicker.

Further developments in language labs are now apparent as access moves from a fixed network and related Microsoft operating systems to online and browsers. Students can now access and work from these new 'cloud' labs from their own devices at any time and anywhere. Students can interrogate and record audio and video files and be marked and assessed by their teachers remotely.

== Functionality ==
The levels of functionality of current language labs vary from manufacturer to manufacturer. All labs will have a level of teacher control to manage student licenses / desktops. The more sophisticated ‘software only’ labs have a higher level of teacher management and control over the student desktop. One of the key differences with the ‘high end’ ‘software only’ products is their ability to work ‘live’ with the students as they record and work with media. So instead of waiting to correct student recordings after they have been recorded and collected back it is now possible for a teacher to work synchronously and ‘live’ with students on their own, in pairs and in groups, thus enhancing the immediacy of the teaching and learning experience.

The next generation digital language labs allow teachers to monitor, control, deliver, group, display, review and collect, audio, video and web-based multimedia content. The student player is linked to the teacher console and can play audio, video and web-based formats. Students can rewind, stop, start, go back to last silence, record, fast forward, repeat phrase and bookmark.

== Bibliography ==
- Plate, B. (2015). Language Labs: A Brief History.
- Baker, M., Buyya, R., & Laforenza, D. (2002). Grids and Grid technologies for wide‐area distributed computing. Software: Practice and Experience, 32(15), 1437-1466.
