= Accademia Vivarium Novum =

Italian school

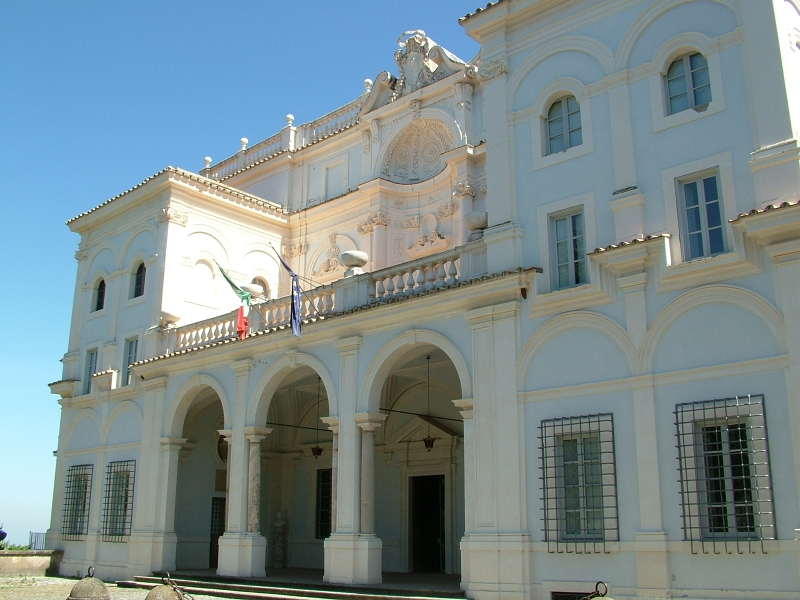
- Villa Falconieri - Home of The Accademia Vivarium Novum

Location
- Villa Falconieri; Italy; 41°48′25.5″N 12°41′20.9″E

Information
- Established: 1998
- Founder: Luigi Miraglia
- Language: Latin
- Publication: Vivarium Novum Academy Editions
- Website: vivariumnovum.net

The Academy Vivarium Novum (or Accademia in Italian) is a college in Rome founded in 1998. Students can spend one or more years immersed in Latin and Ancient Greek, which are spoken both in and outside of the classroom.

The Academy Vivarium Novum was founded with the intent to preserve the tradition of Renaissance schools and their teaching methods. It wants to induce a rebirth of the humanities based on the belief that dignity (dignitas hominis) may be attained only by continuous self-examination. Students are trained to learn Latin and Ancient Greek.

== History ==
The institution was founded by Luigi Miraglia, a Latinist and classical philologist, in 1991. Its roots trace back to a previous language-revival experimental institution in the 1980s on the small, uninhabited island of Vivara in the Gulf of Naples.

The international campus project officially began in 1998, promoted by classical scholars Giovanni Pugliese Carratelli and Gerardo Marotta, who were concerned about the fate of classical disciplines in Europe. The Mnemosyne Foundation was subsequently established in 2000 to create the international center.

The Academy was initially situated in a headquarters in Montella (AV), in the Irpinia region. In August 2016, the Academy received the concession for its current, stable headquarters at Villa Falconieri in Frascati, a "Borrominian jewel" of the Castelli Romani, with support from the Ministry of Cultural Heritage and the Ministry of Education.

== Academic year ==
The main programme offered by the Academy, which is held from the beginning of October up to the end of June, mainly aims to provide students with a strong experience in the domain of the Humanities. The subjects of the courses are principally Ancient Greek philosophy, Latin literature, Renaissance literature, Ancient Greek language and literature and Roman History. The course of History of poetry and ancient prosody combines ancient verses with music, in order to explain their metrical structure in a more efficient way. The choir of the Academy, Tyrtarion (from the names of Tyrtaeus and Arion), has already become well known in the domain of Latin and Greek poetry. Despite the curriculum being taught in classical languages, the programme's aim is not the mastery of the Latin and ancient Greek languages for their own sake. Rather, these languages are thought of as instrumental in understanding the most significant aspects of the western world's literary, philosophical, and historical legacy, and how it has been shaped by them.

Pupils from sixteen to twenty-five years of age are admitted to the Academy; every year, an application process is organised in order to receive scholarships and be admitted to the Academy for one year. Room, board, classes and didactic materials are all provided free to recipients.

== Partnerships and collaborations ==
The Academy collaborates with over one hundred universities worldwide that participate in a consortium to select and send students. It works with institutions such as the Warburg Institute in London and the École des hautes études en sciences sociales in Paris. It has partnered with Beijing Foreign Studies University in Beijing, China, to establish the first Faculty of Western Classical Letters. It has also established an International School of Advanced Studies in collaboration with ISMEO and the University of Naples "L'Orientale", which hosts recognized scholars from around the world.

== Summer course ==
In order to fund these scholarships and to foster effective methods of teaching Latin and Greek, the Academy and the Mnemosyne Foundation organise each year an intensive Summer Course of Latin. This course lasts exactly eight weeks, from the end of June to the middle of August, and aims to bring students to the easy reading of the classics without any previous knowledge. The course is divided into two modules of four weeks, and is open to pupils of all ages and genders.

== Tyrtarion ==
Tyrtarion, or the Tyrtarion choir, is the band and choir of the school Accademia Vivarium Novum. Led by Eusebius Aron Tóth, the Tyrtarion choir aims to illustrate and preserve ancient poetry, literature, and music. The choir is known for its restoration of Latin and Ancient Greek poetry. The name Tyrtarion was established in 2010 by joining the names of the poets Tyrtaeus and Arion.

Tyrtarion performs classical, baroque, and Renaissance music. Usually, they perform the works and poems of ancient Roman and Greek poets such as Homer, Sappho, Anacreon, Lucretius, Catullus, Virgil, and Horace.

== See also ==
- Contemporary Latin
- Luigi Miraglia
- Linguistics
- Ancient Greek
- Hans Ørberg
- Lingua Latina per se illustrata
