= Sandwich technique =

Language teaching technique

In foreign language teaching, the sandwich technique is the oral insertion of an idiomatic translation in the mother tongue between an unknown phrase in the learned language and its repetition, in order to convey meaning as rapidly and completely as possible. The mother tongue equivalent can be given almost as an aside, with a slight break in the flow of speech to mark it as an intruder.

When modeling a dialogue sentence for students to repeat, the teacher not only gives an oral mother tongue equivalent for unknown words or phrases, but repeats the foreign language phrase before students imitate it: L2 => L1 => L2. For example, a German teacher of English might engage in the following exchange with the students:

Teacher: "Let me try—lass mich mal versuchen—let me try."
Students: "Let me try."

With this technique meaning is conveyed quickly, interference from the mother tongue (or negative transfer) is avoided and students can fully concentrate on repeating the foreign phrase correctly. Proponents of this technique (notably Butzkamm & Caldwell and Dodson) claim that this bilingual technique makes it easier to establish the foreign language as the working language of the classroom. By and by, the teacher introduces important classroom phrases in order to create a foreign language atmosphere:

Teacher: "Your job is to match the sentences—die Sätze zuzuordnen—to match the sentences."

Teacher and students consistently keep track of expressions introduced so that further translations can be avoided. The teacher can also use richer and more authentic texts sooner, for instance in telling stories:

Teacher: "…and her stepmother scolded her without mercy—schimpfte sie erbarmungslos aus—she scolded her without mercy…"

Mother tongue equivalents are always and immediately given in contexts, which is a far cry from isolated vocabulary equations. By using the mother tongue skillfully, it is argued, eventually whole lessons in the foreign language only can be given.
