= Direct method (education) =

Language-teaching methodology

The direct method of teaching, which is sometimes called the natural method, and is often (but not exclusively) used in teaching foreign languages, refrains from using the learners' native language and uses only the target language. It was established in the United Kingdom around the year 1900 and contrasts with the grammar–translation method and other traditional approaches, as well as with C.J. Dodson's bilingual method. It was adopted by key international language schools such as Berlitz, Alliance Française, and Inlingua School of Languages in the 1970s. Many of the language departments of the Foreign Service Institute of the U.S. State Department adopted the Method starting in 2012.

In general, teaching focuses on the development of oral skills. Characteristic features of the direct method are:

- teaching concepts and vocabulary through pantomiming, real-life objects and other visual materials
- teaching grammar by using an inductive approach (i.e. having learners find out rules through the presentation of adequate linguistic forms in the target language)
- the centrality of spoken language (including a native-like pronunciation)
- focus on question–answer patterns

== Definition ==
The direct method aims to completely avoid involvement of the learners' native language. This method is based on the assumption that the learner should experience the new language in the same way as he/she experienced his/her mother tongue as a child. The direct method in teaching a language is directly establishing an immediate and audiovisual association between experience, expression, words, phrases, idioms and meanings, rules, and performances through the teachers' body and mental skills.

== Essentials ==
1. No translation.
2. Concepts are taught by means of objects or by natural contexts through the mental and physical skills of the teacher only.
3. Oral training helps in reading, writing, listening and speaking simultaneously.
4. Grammar is taught indirectly through the implication of the situation creation.

== Techniques ==
1. Question/answer exercise – the teacher asks questions of any type and the student answers.
2. Conversation practice – the students are given an opportunity to ask their own questions to fellow students or to the teacher. This enables both a teacher-learner interaction and learner-learner interaction.
3. Dictation/Reading – the teacher chooses a grade-appropriate passage and reads it aloud; the students take turns reading aloud sections of a passage, play or a dialogue.
4. Student self-correction – should the student make a mistake, the teacher offers student an opportunity for self-correction.
5. Paragraph writing (advanced) – students are asked to write a passage in their own words.

== Nature ==
1. The direct method is also known as the natural method. It was developed as a reaction to the grammar-translation method and is designed to take the learner into the domain of the target language in the most natural manner.
2. The main objective is to impart a perfect command of a foreign language. The main focus is to make the learner process phrases and vocabulary in the targeted language. This more natural path is in the same manner as the learning of his/her mother tongue.
3. In traditional language-learning, pupil participation was found to be diminished because the teaching is perceived to be burdensome, uninspiring, and even monotonous.

== Merits ==
1. Facilitates understanding of language – understanding of the target language becomes easier due to the inhibition of the linguistic interferences from the mother tongue, it establishes a direct bond between contexts and helps in understanding directly what is heard and read
2. Improves fluency of speech – fluency of speech results in easier writing, it tends to improve expression, expression in writing, and it is a quick way of learning and expanding vocabulary
3. Aids reading – reading becomes easier and more pleasant, and it also promotes a habit of critical studying
4. Improves the development of language sense
5. Full of activities, which make it interesting and exciting
6. Emphasizes the target language by helping the pupil express their thoughts and feelings directly in target language without using their mother tongue
7. Develops listening, speaking, reading.
8. Increased employment opportunities
9. Helps in bringing words from passive vocabulary into active vocabulary
10. Helps in proceeding the English language from particular to general, it bridges the gap between practice and theory
11. Makes use of audio-visual aids and also facilitates reading and writing
12. Facilitates alertness and participation of students

== Demerits ==
1. Minimizes systematic written work and reading activities
2. Traditional methods for higher-level classes may rely more on translation methods.
3. Supports more limited vocabulary.
4. Teachers need to be trained in the Method.
5. Minimizes reading and writing aspects of language learning
6. Somewhat more time-consuming to create real-life situations

== Principles ==
1. Classroom instruction is conducted exclusively in the target language.
2. Only everyday vocabulary and sentences are taught during the initial phase; grammar, reading, and writing are introduced in the intermediate phase.
3. Oral communication skills are built up in a carefully graded progression organized around question-and-answer exchanges between teachers and students in small, intensive classes.
4. Grammar is taught inductively.
5. New teaching points are introduced orally.
6. Concrete vocabulary is taught through demonstration, objects, and pictures; abstract vocabulary is taught by association of ideas.
7. Both speech and listening comprehension is taught.
8. Correct pronunciation and grammar are emphasized.
9. Students should be speaking approximately 80% of the time during the lesson.
10. Students are taught from inception to ask questions as well as answer them.

== Pedagogy ==
The key Aspects of this method are:

I. Introduction of new word, number, alphabet character, sentence or concept (referred to as an Element) :

• SHOW...Point to Visual Aid or Gestures (for verbs), to ensure student clearly understands what is being taught.
• SAY...Teacher verbally introduces Element, with care and enunciation.
• TRY...Student makes various attempts to pronounce new Element.
• MOULD...Teacher corrects student if necessary, pointing to mouth to show proper shaping of lips, tongue and relationship to teeth.
• REPEAT...Student repeats each Element 5-20 times.

NOTE: Teachers should be aware of "high-frequency words and verbs" and prioritize teaching for this. (i.e. Teach key verbs such as "To Go" and "To Be" before unusual verbs like "To Trim" or "To Sail"; likewise, teach Apple and Orange before Prune and Cranberry.)

II. Syntax, the correct location of new Element in a sentence:

• SAY & REPEAT...The teacher states a phrase or sentence to a student; the Student repeats such 5-20 times.
• ASK & REPLY IN NEGATIVE...The teacher uses Element in negative situations (e.g. "Are you the President of the United States?" or "Are you the teacher?"); Students says "No". If more advanced may use the negative with "Not".
• INTERROGATIVES Teacher provides intuitive examples using 5 "w"s (Who, What, Where, Why, When) or How". Use random variations to practice.
• PRONOUNS WITH VERBS Using visuals (such as photos or illustrations) or gestures, the Teacher covers all pronouns. Use many random variations such as "Is Ana a woman?" or "Are they from France?" to practice.
• USE AND QUESTIONS...Students must choose and utilize the correct Element, as well as pose appropriate questions as the Teacher did.

III. Progress, from new Element to new Element (within same lesson):

A. Random Sequencing:
1. After new Element (X) is taught and learned, go to next Element (Y).
2. After next Element (Y) is taught and learned, return to practice with Element (X).
3. After these two are alternated (X-Y; Y-X; Y-Y, etc), go to 3rd Element (Z).
4. Go back to 1 and 2, mix in 3, practice (X-Y-Z; Z-Y-X; Y-Y-Z, etc.) and continue building up to an appropriate number of Elements (maybe as many as 20 per lesson, depending on the student, see B.1), practising all possible combinations and repeating 5-20 times each combination.
B. Student-Led Limits:
1. Observe student carefully, to know when mental "saturation" point is reached, indicating student should not be taught more Elements until another time.
2. At this point, stop imparting new information, and simply do Review as follows:
C. Review: Keep random, arbitrary sequencing. If appropriate, use visuals, pointing quickly to each. Employ different examples of Element that are easy to understand, changing country/city names, people names, and words student already knows. Keep a list of everything taught, so proper testing may be done.
D. Observation and Notation: Teacher should maintain a student list of words/phrases that are most difficult for that student. The list is called "Special Attention List"

IV. Progress, from Lesson to Lesson:

• LESSON REVIEW The first few minutes of each lesson are to review prior lesson(s).
• GLOBAL REVIEW Transition from Lesson Review to a comprehensive review, which should always include items from the Special Attention List.

V. Advanced Concepts:

• Intermediate and Advanced Students may skip some Element introduction as appropriate; become aware of student's language abilities, so they are not frustrated by too much review. If Student immediately shows recognition and knowledge, move to next Element.
• Non-Standard Alphabets: Teaching Student to recognize letters/characters and reading words should employ same steps as in above Aspect I, and alphabet variations may be taught using Aspect III. Writing characters and words should initially be done manually, either on paper or whiteboard.
• Country Accents: Any student at intermediate stages or higher should be made aware of subtle variations in pronunciation, which depend on geography within a country or from country to country.

An integral aspect of the Direct Method is varying the setting of teaching; instructors try different scenarios using the same Element. This makes the lessons more "real world," and it allows for some confusing distractions to the student and employs organic variables common in the culture and locale of language use.

== Historical context ==
The direct method was an answer to the dissatisfaction with the older grammar translation method, which teaches students grammar and vocabulary through direct translations and thus focuses on the written language.

There was an attempt to set up conditions that imitate mother tongue acquisition, which is why the beginnings of these attempts were called the natural method. At the turn of the 18th and 19th centuries, Sauveur and Franke proposed that language teaching should be undertaken within the target-language system, which was the first stimulus for the rise of the direct method.

The audio-lingual method was developed in an attempt to address some of the perceived weaknesses of the direct method.

== See also ==
- Language education
- Second language acquisition
- Language immersion
