= Academia Latinitati Fovendae =

Learned society promoting active use of written and spoken Latin

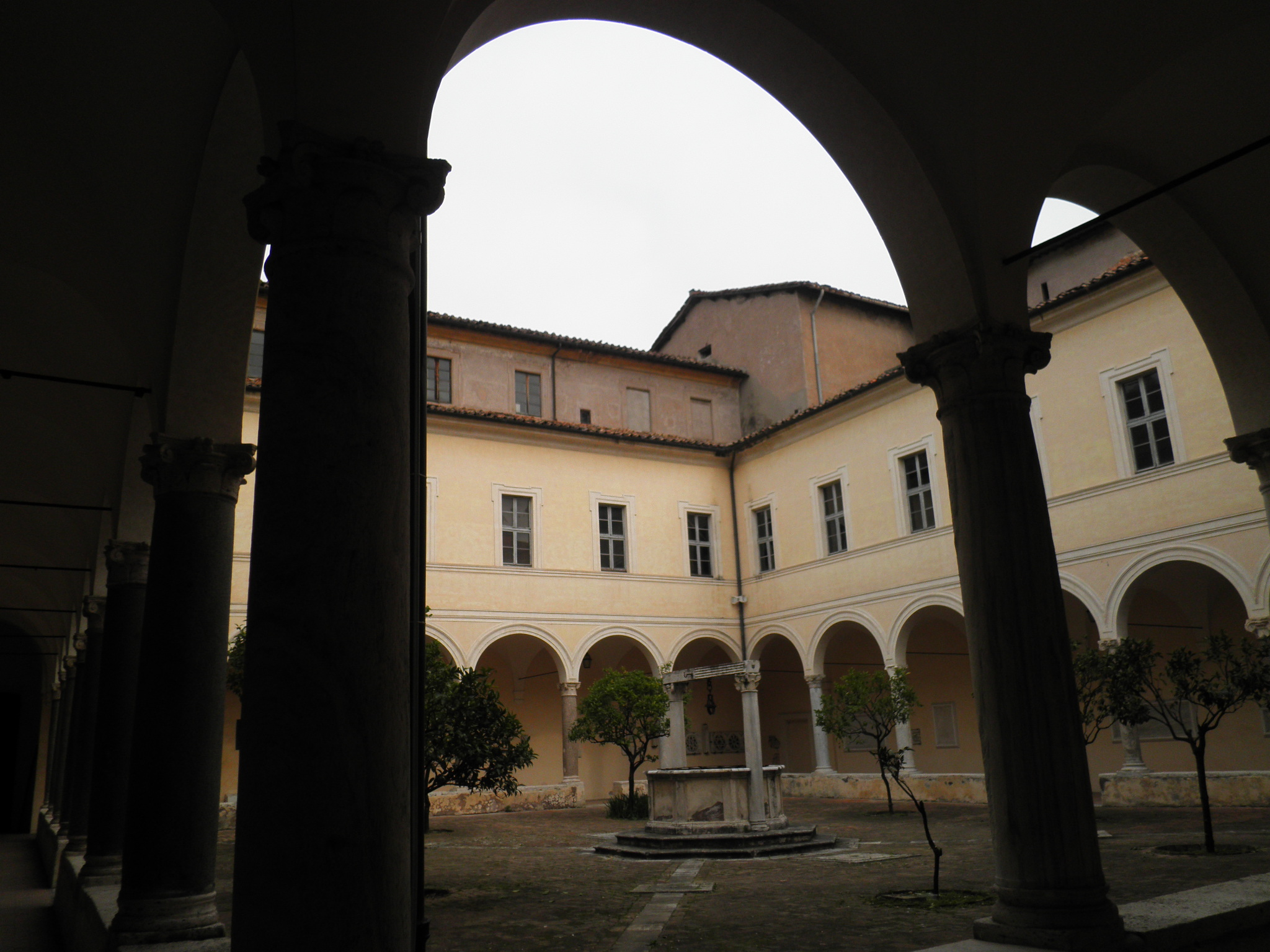
- Headquarters of the Istituto Nazionale di Studi Romani, former monastery of Sant'Alessio, Rome, Aventine
- Formation: 1966 (Congress); 1967 (Voted/Founded); 1970 (Statutes approved)
- Founders: Pietro Romanelli and Nicolae Barbu
- Founded at: Istituto Nazionale di Studi Romani, Rome, Italy
- Type: learned society
- Members: 59 members known as sodales ("members")
- Praeses [President]: Christian Laes (since 2022)
- Website: academialatinitatifovendae.com

The Academia Latinitati Fovendae (ALF; English: Academy for the Promotion of the Latin Language) is a learned society founded in 1967 to promote the use of the Latin language, both written and spoken.

== Mission ==
John Byron Kuhner writes that "the ALF remains, as one member called it, 'the only major fully international body devoted to preserving and promoting the use of Latin in both speaking and in writing'." Kuhner describes an ALF conference:

At first glance, this would appear to be a typical academic conference. Professors are reading papers in lecture halls. But much is different. Everything is conducted in Latin — papers, announcements, conversations over meals.

The Academy describes its mission as follows:
ALF's Original Latin	English Translation
Academia dat operam, ut, ubicumque fieri possit, lingua Latina praebeatur discenda et exerceatur, non solum, ut mos est inveteratus, textus in linguas vernaculas vertendo, sed etiam scribendo et loquendo. Academiae maxime interest, ut in iis scholis, in quibus lingua Latina discenda praebetur, methodis hodiernis ac vividioribus uti liceat, quibus discipuli delectatione ad discendum alliciantur.	The Academy strives to ensure that the Latin language is offered for learning and practice wherever possible, not only by translating texts into vernacular languages, as is the long-established custom, but also by writing and speaking. A top priority of the Academy is to facilitate the use of modern and more lively methods in schools where Latin is taught, so that students are motivated to learn by enjoyment.
— ALF, academialatinitatifovendae.com (2026)

== History ==
Scholar Karolis M. Lyvens summarizes the evolution and present mission and role of ALF:

Initially the movement had an ambition to restore the international use of Latin, but later the changed circumstances consisting from the deteriorated knowledge and position of Latin made it doubt its aims, which were clearly not achievable any more. ... The Academy returned to its roots as an organisation uniting the scholars who believe in the vitality of Latin and who use the language actively.

== Publications ==
- Commentarii (Academiae Latinitati Fovendae commentarii): The academy's primary academic, research and literary journal, entirely in Latin.
- Acta selecta: Proceedings of ALF's major international conventions
- Acta Conventiculorum: Proceedings of topical Latin seminars and workshops; specific thematic discussions
- Libri [Books]: Book series published under the ALF imprint.

== Notable members ==
Sources:

- Orazio Antonio Bologna (2013) Italy
- Armand D'Angour (2023) U.K. (proposed member)
- Synnøve des Bouvrie (1998) Norway
- Neil Coffee (2011) U.S.
- Jason Harris (2015) Ireland
- Christian Laes, Praeses (2007) Belgium
- Karolis Lyvens (2025) Lithuania
- Milena Minkova (1998) Bulgaria, U.S.
- Luigi Miraglia (2011) Italy
- Patrick Owens (2017) U.S.
- Tuomo Pekkanen (of Nuntii Latini) (1968) Finland
- Reijo Pitkäranta (2006) Finland
- François Ploton-Nicollet (2018) France
- Vibeke Roggen (2006) Norway
- Dirk Sacré (1995) Belgium
- Terence Tunberg (1998) U.S.
- Olli Salomies (2010) Finland
- Florian Schaffenrath (2018) Austria
- Alexej Slednikov (2019) Russia
- Kurt Smolak (2000) Germany
- Roberto Spataro, SDB (2015) Italy
- Akihiko Watanabe (2021) Japan

== See also ==
- Pontifical Academy for Latin
- Vita Latina
- Living Latin
- Latinitas Foundation
- Accademia Vivarium Novum
- Jean Capelle, more details at Jean Capelle (in French)
- Pierre Grimal
- Pietro Romanelli
