= Ecclesiastical Latin =

Variety of Latin used by churches

- Church Latin, Liturgical Latin
- Native to: Never spoken as a native language; other uses vary widely by period and location
- Extinct: Still used for many purposes, mostly as a liturgical language of the Latin liturgical rites of the Catholic Church, and (rarely) in Anglicanism and Lutheranism. Also used in the Western Rite of the Eastern Orthodox Church.
- Language family: Indo-European: Italic; Latino-Faliscan; Latin; Ecclesiastical Latin
- Early form: Old Latin
- Writing system: Latin

Language codes
- ISO 639-3: –
- Glottolog: None
- IETF: la-VA

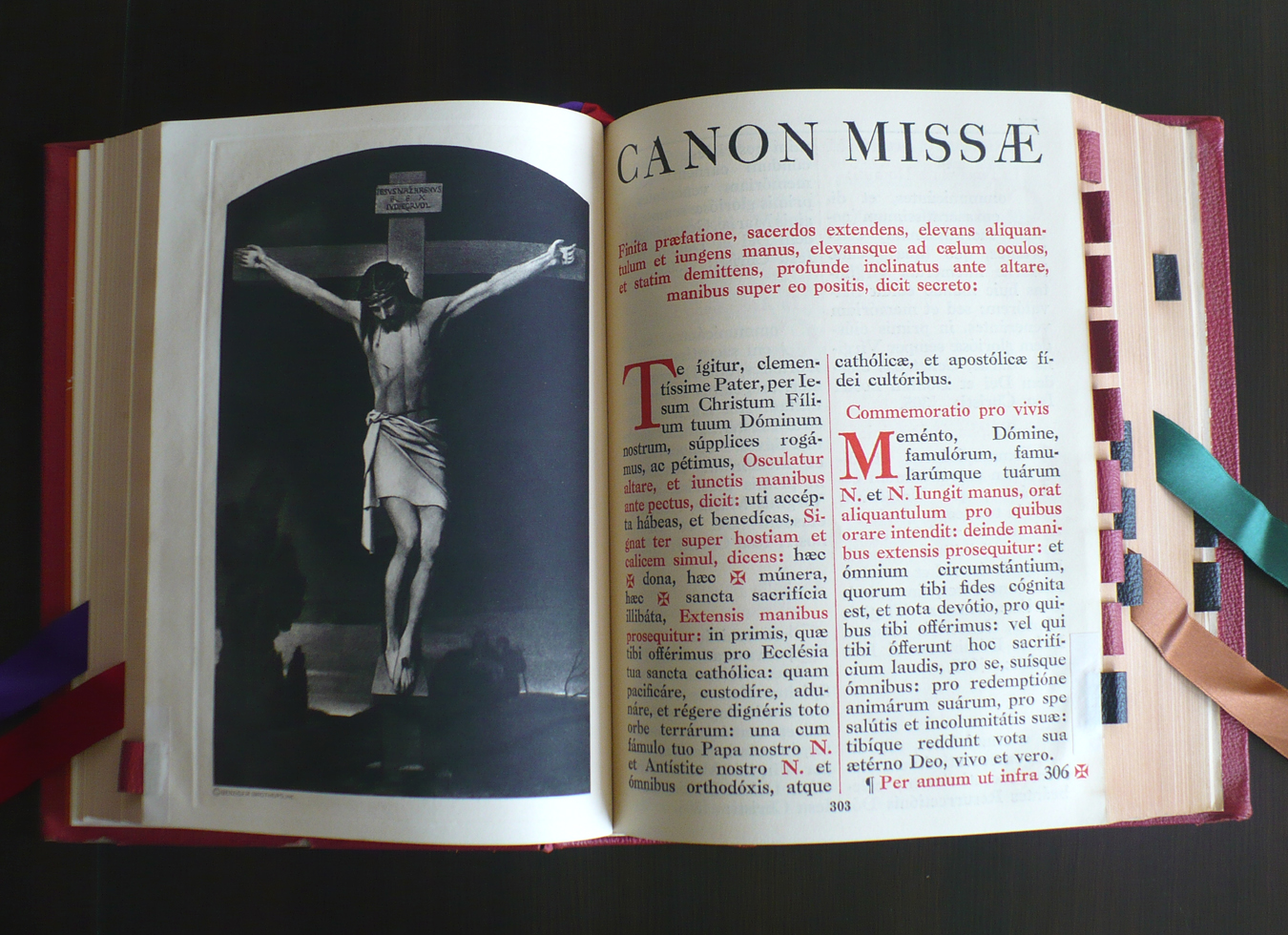
Usage of Ecclesiastical Latin in the Traditional Roman Missal

Ecclesiastical Latin, also called Church Latin or Liturgical Latin, is a form of Latin developed to discuss Christian thought in late antiquity and used in Christian liturgy, theology, and church administration to the present day, especially in the Catholic Church. It includes words from Vulgar Latin and Classical Latin (as well as Greek and Hebrew) re-purposed with Christian meaning. It is less stylized and more rigid in form than Classical Latin, sharing vocabulary, forms, and syntax, while at the same time incorporating informal elements which had always been with the language yet excluded by the literary authors of Classical Latin.

Its pronunciation was partly standardized in the late 8th century during the Carolingian Renaissance as part of Charlemagne's educational reforms, and this new letter-by-letter pronunciation, used in France and England, was adopted in Iberia and Italy a couple of centuries afterwards. As time passed, pronunciation diverged depending on the local vernacular language, giving rise to even highly divergent forms such as the traditional English pronunciation of Latin, which has now been largely abandoned for reading Latin texts. Within the Catholic Church and in certain Protestant churches, such as the Anglican Church, a pronunciation based on modern Italian phonology, known as Italianate Latin, has become common since the late 19th century.

Ecclesiastical Latin is the language of liturgical rites in the Latin Church, as well as the Western Rite of the Eastern Orthodox Church. It is occasionally used in Anglican Church and Lutheran Church liturgies as well. Today, ecclesiastical Latin is primarily used in official documents of the Catholic Church, in the Tridentine Mass, and it is still learned by clergy.

The Ecclesiastical Latin that is used in theological works, liturgical rites and dogmatic proclamations varies in style: syntactically simple in the Vulgate Bible, hieratic (very restrained) in the Roman Canon of the Mass, terse and technical in Thomas Aquinas's Summa Theologica, and Ciceronian (syntactically complex) in Pope John Paul II's encyclical letter Fides et Ratio.

== Usage ==
=== Late antique usage ===
The use of Latin in the Church started in the late fourth century with the split of the Roman Empire after Emperor Theodosius in 395. Before this split, Greek was the primary language of the Church (the New Testament was written in Greek and the Septuagint – a Greek translation of the Hebrew bible – was in widespread use among both Christians and Hellenized Jews) as well as the language of the eastern half of the Roman Empire. Following the split, early theologians like Jerome translated Greek and Hebrew texts into Latin, the dominant language of the Western Roman Empire. The loss of Greek in the Western half of the Roman Empire, and the loss of Latin in the Eastern half of the Roman Empire were not immediate, but changed the culture of language as well as the development of the Church. What especially differentiates Ecclesiastical Latin from Classical Latin is the consequences of its use as a language for translating, since it has borrowed and assimilated constructions and vocabulary from the koine Greek, while adapting the meanings of some Latin words to those of the koine Greek originals, which are sometimes themselves translations of Hebrew originals.

=== Medieval usage ===
At first there was no distinction between Latin and the actual Romance vernacular, the former being just the traditional written form of the latter. For instance, in ninth-century Spain ⟨saeculum⟩ was simply the correct way to spell [sjeɡlo], meaning 'century'. The writer would not have actually read it aloud as /sɛkulum/ any more than an English speaker today would pronounce ⟨knight⟩ as */knɪxt/.

The spoken version of Ecclesiastical Latin was created later during the Carolingian Renaissance. The English scholar Alcuin, tasked by Charlemagne with improving the standards of Latin writing in France, prescribed a pronunciation based on a fairly literal interpretation of Latin spelling. For example, in a radical break from the traditional system, a word such as ⟨viridiarium⟩ 'orchard' now had to be read aloud precisely as it was spelled rather than */verdʒjær/ (later spelled as Old French vergier). The Carolingian reforms soon brought the new Church Latin from France to other lands where Romance was spoken.

=== Usage during the Reformation and in modern Protestant churches ===
The use of Latin in the Western Church continued into the Early modern period. One of Martin Luther's tenets during the Reformation was to have services and religious texts in the common tongue, rather than Latin, a language that at the time, many did not understand. Protestants refrained from using Latin in services, however Protestant clergy had to learn and understand Latin as it was the language of higher learning and theological thought until the 18th century. After the Reformation, in the Lutheran churches, Latin was retained as the language of the Mass for weekdays, although for the Sunday Sabbath, the Deutsche Messe was to be said. In Geneva, among the Reformed churches, "persons called before the consistory to prove their faith answered by reciting the Paternoster, the Ave Maria, and the Credo in Latin." In the Anglican Church, the Book of Common Prayer was published in Latin, alongside English. John Wesley, the founder of the Methodist churches, "used Latin text in doctrinal writings", as Martin Luther and John Calvin did in their era. In the training of Protestant clergy in Württemberg, as well as in the Rhineland, universities instructed divinity students in Latin and their examinations were conducted in this language. The University of Montauban, under Reformed auspices, required that seminarians complete two theses, with one being in Latin; thus Reformed ministers were "Latinist by training", comparable to Catholic seminarians.

=== Modern Catholic usage ===
Ecclesiastical Latin continues to be the official language of the Catholic Church. The Second Vatican Council (1962–1965) allowed the Mass to be celebrated in vernacular languages, leaving the option to celebrate the Mass in Latin to the celebrating priest. The Church produces liturgical texts in Latin, which provide a single clear point of reference for translations into all other languages. The same holds for the texts of canon law. Pope Benedict XVI gave his unexpected resignation speech in Latin.

The Holy See has for some centuries usually drafted documents in a modern language, but the authoritative text, published in the Acta Apostolicae Sedis, is usually in Latin. Some texts may be published initially in a modern language and be later revised, according to a Latin version (or "editio typica"), after this Latin version is published. For example, the Catechism of the Catholic Church was drafted and published, in 1992, in French. The Latin text appeared five years later, in 1997, and the French text was corrected to match the Latin version, which is regarded as the official text. The Latin-language department of the Vatican Secretariat of State (formerly the Secretaria brevium ad principes et epistolarum latinarum) is charged with the preparation in Latin of papal and curial documents. Sometimes, the official text is published in a modern language, e.g., the well-known edict Tra le sollecitudini (1903) by Pope Pius X (in Italian) and Mit brennender Sorge (1937) by Pope Pius XI (in German).

== Comparison with Classical Latin ==
There are both many differences and similarities between Classical Latin and Church Latin. Someone who knows the Latin of classical texts can generally understand Church Latin because the two forms share most of the same grammar and structure, though they differ in pronunciation, spelling, and some vocabulary.

In many countries, those who speak Latin for liturgical or other ecclesiastical purposes, especially in the Roman Catholic Church, use the Italian-based pronunciation that is traditional in Rome. The impetus for the adoption of this pronunciation as a universal Catholic standard began with the First Vatican Council of 1869-1870, but was especially strengthened by Pope Pius X (1903–1914), who dealt with the subject in a Motu proprio about sacred music in 1903 and in a letter he sent to the Archbishop of Bourges in 1912. This pronunciation has also been adopted in some Anglican churches. In this system, the letters are given that the value they have in modern Italian but without distinguishing between open and close ⟨e⟩ and ⟨o⟩. The Classical diphthongs ⟨ae⟩ and ⟨oe⟩ are pronounced as monophthongal ⟨e⟩ in the Ecclesiastical register, and because of that, they are usually written as the ligatures æ and œ, which is not done in Classical Latin. ⟨c⟩ and ⟨g⟩ before ⟨ae⟩, ⟨oe⟩, ⟨e⟩, ⟨y⟩ and ⟨i⟩ are pronounced /t͡ʃ/ (English ⟨ch⟩) and /d͡ʒ/ (English ⟨j⟩), respectively. ⟨ti⟩ before a vowel is generally pronounced /tsi/ (unless preceded by ⟨s⟩, ⟨d⟩ or ⟨t⟩). Such speakers pronounce consonantal ⟨v⟩ (not written as ⟨u⟩) as /v/ as in English, not as Classical /w/. Like in Classical Latin, double consonants are pronounced with gemination.

The distinction in Classical Latin between long and short vowels is ignored, and vowels are therefore not marked with the 'macron' or 'apex' to mark vowel length as in Classical Latin. Instead, an acute accent is used for stress, as in Spanish or monotonic Greek. The first syllable of two-syllable words is stressed; in longer words, an acute accent is placed over the stressed vowel: adorémus 'let us adore'; Dómini 'of the Lord'.

== Language materials ==
The complete text of the Bible in Latin, the revised Vulgate, appears at Nova Vulgata – Bibliorum Sacrorum Editio. New Advent gives the entire Bible, in the Douay version, verse by verse, accompanied by the Vulgate Latin of each verse.

In 1976, the Latinitas Foundation (Opus Fundatum Latinitas in Latin) was established by Pope Paul VI to promote the study and use of Latin. Its headquarters are in Vatican City. The foundation publishes an eponymous quarterly in Latin. The foundation also published a 15,000-word Italian-Latin Lexicon Recentis Latinitatis (Dictionary of Recent Latin), which provides Latin coinages for modern concepts, such as a bicycle (birota), a cigarette (fistula nicotiana), a computer (instrumentum computatorium), a cowboy (armentarius), a motel (deversorium autocineticum), shampoo (capitilavium), a strike (operistitium), a terrorist (tromocrates), a trademark (ergasterii nota), an unemployed person (invite otiosus), a waltz (chorea Vindobonensis), and even a miniskirt (tunicula minima) and hot pants (brevissimae bracae femineae). Some 600 such terms extracted from the book appear on a page of the Vatican website. The Latinitas Foundation was superseded by the Pontifical Academy for Latin (Latin: Pontificia Academia Latinitatis) in 2012.

== Current use ==
Latin remains an often-used language of the Holy See and the Latin liturgical rites of the Catholic Church. Until the 1960s and still later in Roman colleges like the Gregorian, Catholic priests studied theology using Latin textbooks and the language of instruction in many seminaries was also Latin, which was seen as the language of the Church Fathers. The use of Latin in pedagogy and in theological research, however, has since declined. Nevertheless, canon law requires for seminary formation to provide for a thorough training in Latin, though "the use of Latin in seminaries and pontifical universities has now dwindled to the point of extinction." Latin was still spoken in recent international gatherings of Catholic leaders, such as the Second Vatican Council, and it is still used at conclaves to elect a new Pope. The Tenth Ordinary General Assembly of the Synod of Bishops in 2004 was the most recent to have a Latin-language group for discussions.

Although Latin is the traditional liturgical language of the Western (Latin) Church, the liturgical use of the vernacular has predominated since the liturgical reforms that followed the Second Vatican Council: liturgical law for the Latin Church states that Mass may be celebrated either in Latin or another language in which the liturgical texts, translated from Latin, have been legitimately approved. The permission granted for continued use of the Tridentine Mass in its 1962 form authorizes use of the vernacular language in proclaiming the Scripture readings after they are first read in Latin.

In historic Protestant churches, such as the Anglican Communion and Lutheran churches, Ecclesiastical Latin is occasionally employed in sung celebrations of the Mass.
