= Josef Haslinger (priest) =

Austrian priest and Latinist

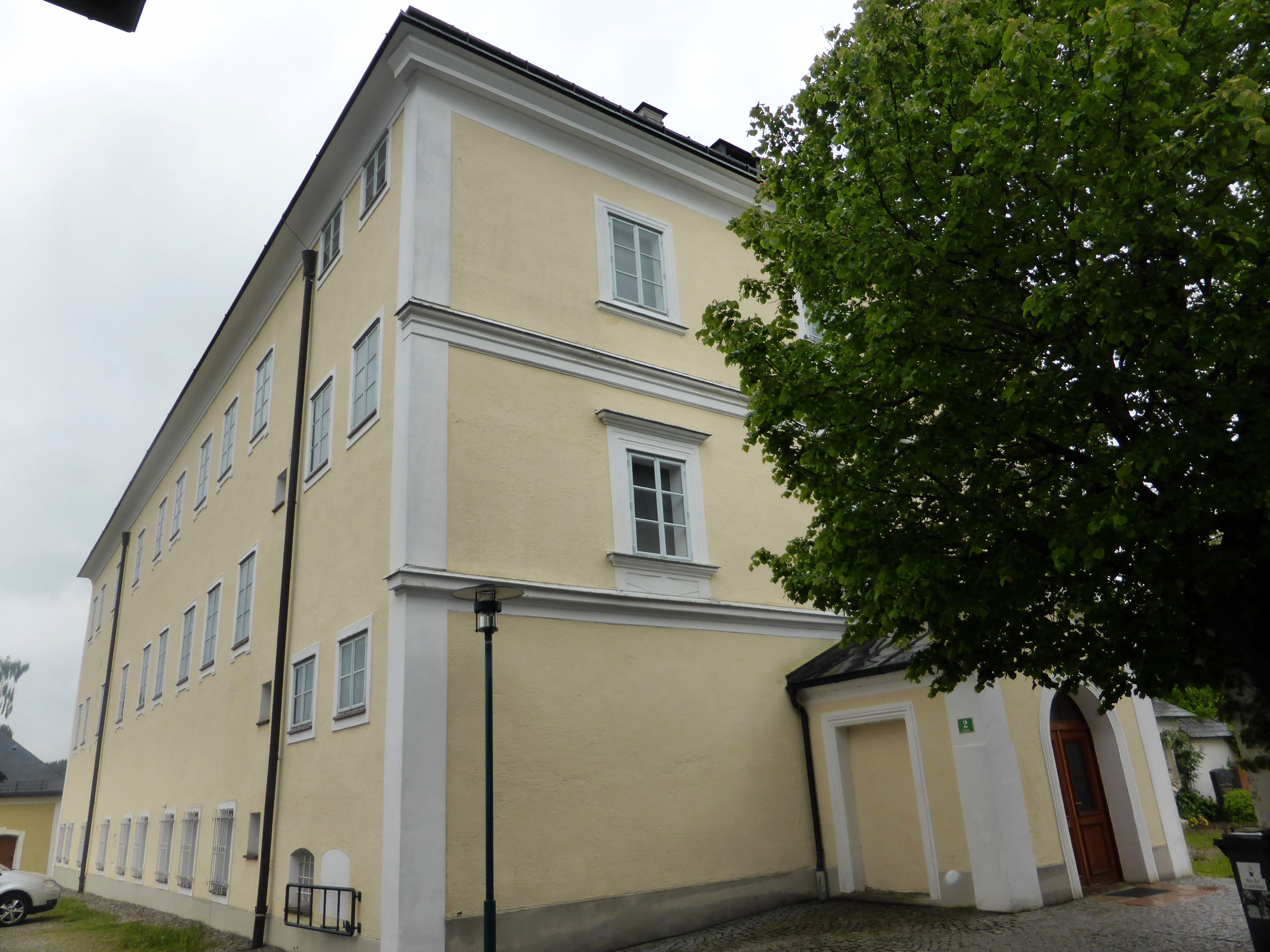
Collegial Convent at Seekirchen; residence of Josef Haslinger until 1988

Josef Haslinger (born December 10, 1904 in Sankt Georgen an der Gusen in Upper Austria; died February 24, 1994 in Bad Mühllacken) was an Austrian pastor and missionary.

== Life ==
Haslinger attended the Aloysian College in Linz and took his matriculation examination at Kalksburg College. Then, from the autumn of 1929, he studied philosophy and theology at the University of Salzburg. During these years, he spent his life in the seminarian college. On July 13, 1933, he was ordained a priest at Salzburg Cathedral. He was ordained chaplain in Berndorf (1934–37) and St. Johann im Pongau and became secretary of the Catholic University Society. He was then beneficiarius in Hopfgarten. On 9 January 1939, the Nazis withdrew his permission to teach religion in schools. On 17 March 1939, when the boys and girls were about to make their confessions, the Gestapo arrested him. In 1941, after Haslinger was released from prison, he was finally released. The reason for his abduction was a homily he had delivered from the pulpit on 25 March 1939 about false prophets, which could have been considered an insult to the rulers.

He was then chaplain in the parishes of Unternberg, Böckstein, Hopfgarten and Goldegg. Between 1949 and 1962, he served as a missionary in the state of Bahia. Returning to his homeland, Haslinger cared for souls at the hospital of St. John (Salzburg) before becoming parish priest in Straßwalchen (1962-64) and catechist in Seekirchen. In 1969 and 1970 he was assistant in Elixhausen.

He often traveled with pilgrims who visited the places of Mary's apparitions. In 1988, after the death of his sister, he had to move to a Catholic geriatric home in Bad Mühllacken; for a few years from there he went to Linz celebrate masses in the church of the Friars Minor. His tomb is in the canons' cemetery in Seekirchen.

In 1987, when there was hope of reaching some agreement between the Society of Saint Pius X and the Holy See, he met Marcel Lefebvre in Salzburg (who was there to administer the sacrament of confirmation) and visited him again in Enns.

Haslinger also worked to promote Living Latin. He was present and assisted the moderator in several of the weekly Latin activities of the Latinitas Foundation, which were called Feriae Latinae. Haslinger was fluent in French, Greek, Hebrew, Spanish, Italian, Latin, English, and Portuguese.
