= Hassinger =

Hassinger is a surname. Notable people with the surname include:

- David Hassinger (1927–2007), American recording engineer and record producer
- Maren Hassinger (born 1947), American artist and educator

== See also ==
- Haslinger
