= Latin dictionary =

Latin dictionary may refer to:

- A Latin Dictionary
- Oxford Latin Dictionary
- Lexicon Recentis Latinitatis
- Orbis Latinus
- Thesaurus Linguae Latinae
- William Whitaker's Words
