= Vibeke Roggen =

Norwegian philologist (born 1952)

- Born: 1 February 1952 (age 74)
- Occupation: Classical philologist
- Awards: Academia Latinitati Fovendae

Academic background
- Thesis: Intellectual play - word and picture: A study of Nils Thomassøn's Latin rebus book Cestus sapphicus. With edition, translation and a corpus of sources. (2001)

Academic work
- Institutions: University of Oslo

Anne Vibeke Roggen (born 1 February 1952) is a Norwegian philologist, known for her translations from Latin and among the country's foremost experts on the humanist Niels Thomessøn.

== Career ==
Roggen is Associate Professor at the University of Oslo, specialising in philology, Latin translation and the work of the priest Niels Thomessøn. She demonstrated that his work "Cestus Sapphicus" is a rebus book, and not a textbook in Latin, as had been claimed by Francis Bull. She has also worked on the reception of Latin in Norway, with a particular focus on texts composed before 1650. In 2005, she was admitted to the Academia Latinitati Fovendae. She writes and speaks widely about the value of studying classical history and its relevance to life today.

In 2015, she worked on a new uncensored Norwegian-Latin dictionary, which included words for sexual acts which had been omitted from earlier dictionaries in order to avoid offending religious sensibilities.

In 2018 she was outspoken against the dropping of the song Gaudeamus igitur from University of Oslo traditions.
