= HLFS Ursprung =

Agricultural school in Salzburg, Austria

Höhere land-und forstwirtschaftliche Schule Ursprung

Address
- Ursprungstrasse 4 Elixhausen; Salzburg 5161; Austria
- Coordinates: 47.879912°N 13.063785°E

Information
- Type: Höhere Bundeslehranstalt (Higher Technical Institute)
- Established: 1963
- Principal: OStR Ing. Mag. Josef Wimmer
- Website: hlfs.ursprung.at

The HLFS (Höhere Land- und Forstwirtschaftliche Schule) Urspung school is one of a few agricultural schools found in Austria and the flagship agricultural school for all western Austrian states. The school is located in the town of Elixhausen, within the Austrian state of Salzburg.

== History ==
Ursprung was first mentioned in 1122 CE. It was a small farm near the village of "Ursprinch". Its roots date to a brewery built in 1682. Shortly thereafter, the castle "Ursprung" was constructed and remains part of the school. The first students enrolled in Klessheim in 1963. In 1968, when the school was finished being built, they completed their studies at Ursprung. In 1985, the school made a big change. The farm switched from conventional agriculture to organic. First, it was only an agricultural school, but since 1997 there has been a new branch called "environmental technology". After the introduction of the environmental technology branch, the number of girls attending increased steadily and today the student body is more than one-third female. As a consequence of the high number of students enrolling, they had to build a second boarding school. Since the additional implementation of the "Aufbaulehrgang" branch, the number of students has increased further and so there will be a plan for more classrooms and a third boarding school in the near future.

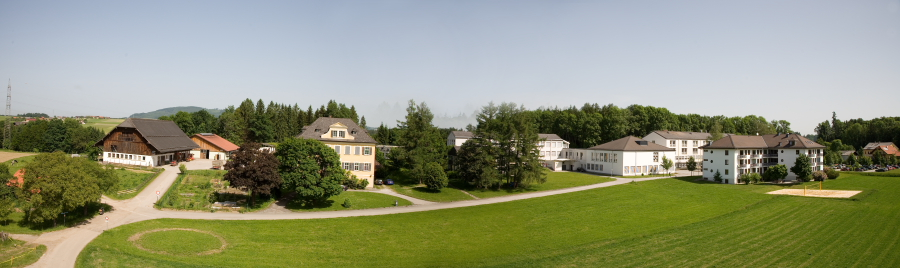
The HLFS (Höhere land- und forstwirtschaftliche Schule) Urspung School: (Barn/Stables, Schloss, School and Boarding houses, left-to-right)

== Subjects and projects ==
A wide range and variety of subjects are offered at HLFS Urspung along the tracks of three major branches of study: Umwelttechnik (Environmental Technology), Landwirtschaft (Agriculture), and Aufbaulehrgang (Advanced training).

=== Agricultural ===
Agricultural subjects include:

- Animal breeding
- Crop growing
- Fruit growing
- Forestry
- Farming machine technologies

=== Academic ===
==== Natural sciences ====
Natural sciences are needed to get a basic knowledge of natural processes. This is particularly important because other subjects, like animal breeding or crop growing, are based on them. Academic subjects, on the other hand, include Physics, Chemistry, Biology, and Geography. Furthermore, the school provides a branch of study that is called "environmental technology". In this branch, ways of renewable energy production are presented and the students learn how to calculate energy losses and ways to avoid them.

==== Economics ====
Students attending Ursprung learn a lot about marketing and accounting due to its importance to farmers. Quality Management, an increasingly important topic to farmers, is also taught in relation to other economic subjects.

==== Languages ====
German and German History of Literature classes create an important base for many other subjects, but students also learn foreign languages, like English. After two years, students can decide to learn Spanish in addition to the other languages or specialize in English.

==== Practice ====
Theoretical knowledge is essential, but practice and practical knowledge are even more essential. So, students get the chance to work in every part of the school farm: the cow shed, the forestry shop, the metal and wood workshops, and also in the butchery. The other part of practical education takes place in the laboratory, where students analyze soil, feed, water, and many other substances.

==== Other subjects ====
Like every other school, Ursprung has a number of basic subjects like: P.E., religion, and justice. Additionally, Ursprung has a special class for communication and presentation.

==== Matura ====
The Matura is the exam for finishing school at Ursprung. It consists of two parts. First, there is the written part, where students can choose between Business Studies or English and German. Then, there is a project week in which they have to solve problems through practical applications and exercises. The questions can be about Livestock Farming, Crop Management, Environmental Management, Chemical Laboratory, Microbiological Laboratory, Business Studies, Agriculture Machinery Technology, and Rural Development. The second part is the oral test where students can choose from the following subjects: German, Applied Mathematics, Crop Management, Livestock Farming, Genetic Engineering, History, Spanish, Environmental Management, Rural Development, and Religion. After passing the exam, there is a mass and the students celebrate their completion of the Matura together.

=== Projects ===
There are many projects organized by students or teachers to increase the abilities of organization and teamwork. Through these projects the students have a chance to accrue experiences relating to social skills, learning, motivating and organizing a team, acting as a team leader, or simply recognizing the importance of workers in our society.

==== Company planning ====
The students have to think about a business idea and start a fictional company. Thereafter, they interact with other fictional companies in Austria.

==== Junior company ====
In order to gain more practical experience, the students can also decide to found a "Junior Company", instead of a mock one.

==== GBT (Genetic Engineering and Biotechnology) ====
This is also an elective. First, students have a course to get the basics of genetic engineering and biotechnology. Then, one can continue with different projects.

==== PMA (Project Management) ====
In general, one thinks of a project, which has to be turned into reality in one school year. In 2012, for instance, the schoolyard was redesigned by students.

==== Impact ====
Every year some students join a course to learn about new agricultural methods or animals. This project lasts about 3 weeks and takes place in different European countries.

== Facilities ==
The HLFS-Ursprung has many different outdoor and indoor facilities and its own farm where the students learn practical skills.

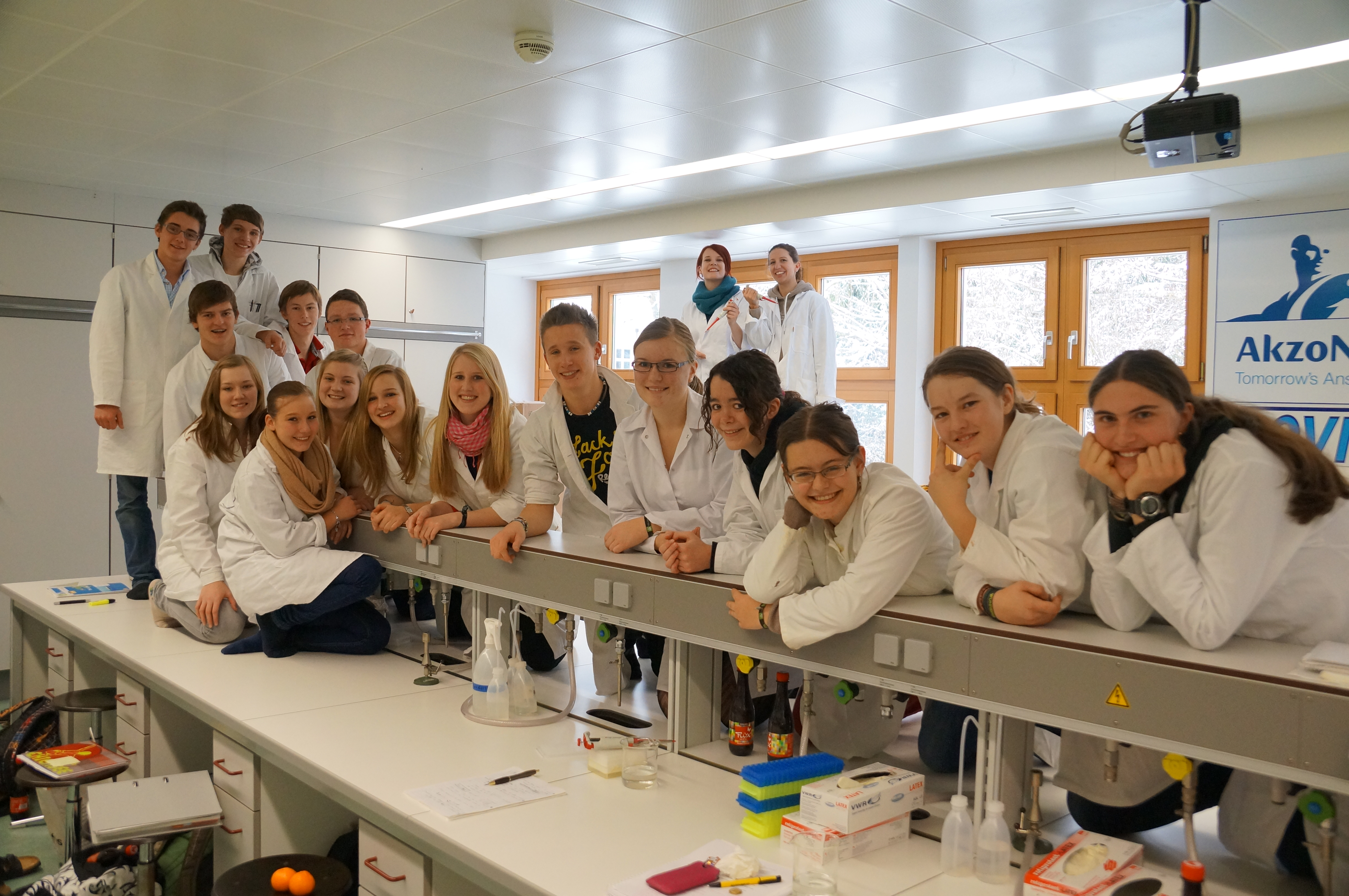
The Lab at HLFS Ursprung

Gym

The gym was built in 1993.

Laboratories

The school has three labs. There is one microbiology lab and two chemistry labs. In these labs, the students practice their theoretical knowledge in chemistry and microbiological processes.

Stables

There are two stables, an old one, which was built before the school started, and a new one, which was built in 2003. The new stable is an exercise pen with access to the outside and includes an automatic feeding station as well as a milking parlor where you can milk six cows at the same time. The old stable is used for breeding pigs, chickens, geese, calves, and sheep and the animals have access to the outside as well. In general, there is a focus on animal welfare at the school.

Butcher's Shop

At the butcher shop, the students get insights into the life of a butcher. They learn how to slaughter animals and how to process the meat into different products like sausages or bacon. The produced goods get sold to teachers, students, and customers.

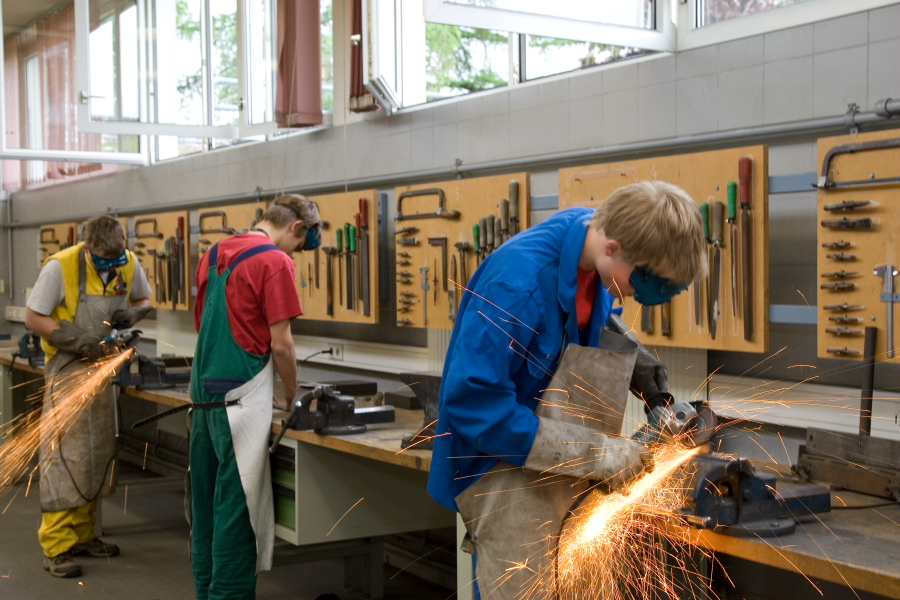
Working at the Forge

Forge

In the forge, which was built in 1994, the students learn how to use a welder and how to work with different types of metals. The forge contains a blacksmith workshop, a couple of welding machines, and CNC (computerized numerical control) mills as well.

Carpenter's Workshop

The carpenter's workshop is another facility at the school where the students learn practical skills.

Library

Today, the school library contains more than 5,000 books and includes all books which the students need for the oral "Matura", or college-entry exam.

== Events ==
Religious Events

The school is traditional and Christian-orientated, so there are various religious events during the school year. The Austrian way of Thanksgiving, Anklöpfeln, and Advent are celebrated. Due to the mostly rural origin of the students, these events are a fixed part of the school year and it should foster in the students a desire to pass the traditions on to the next generation.

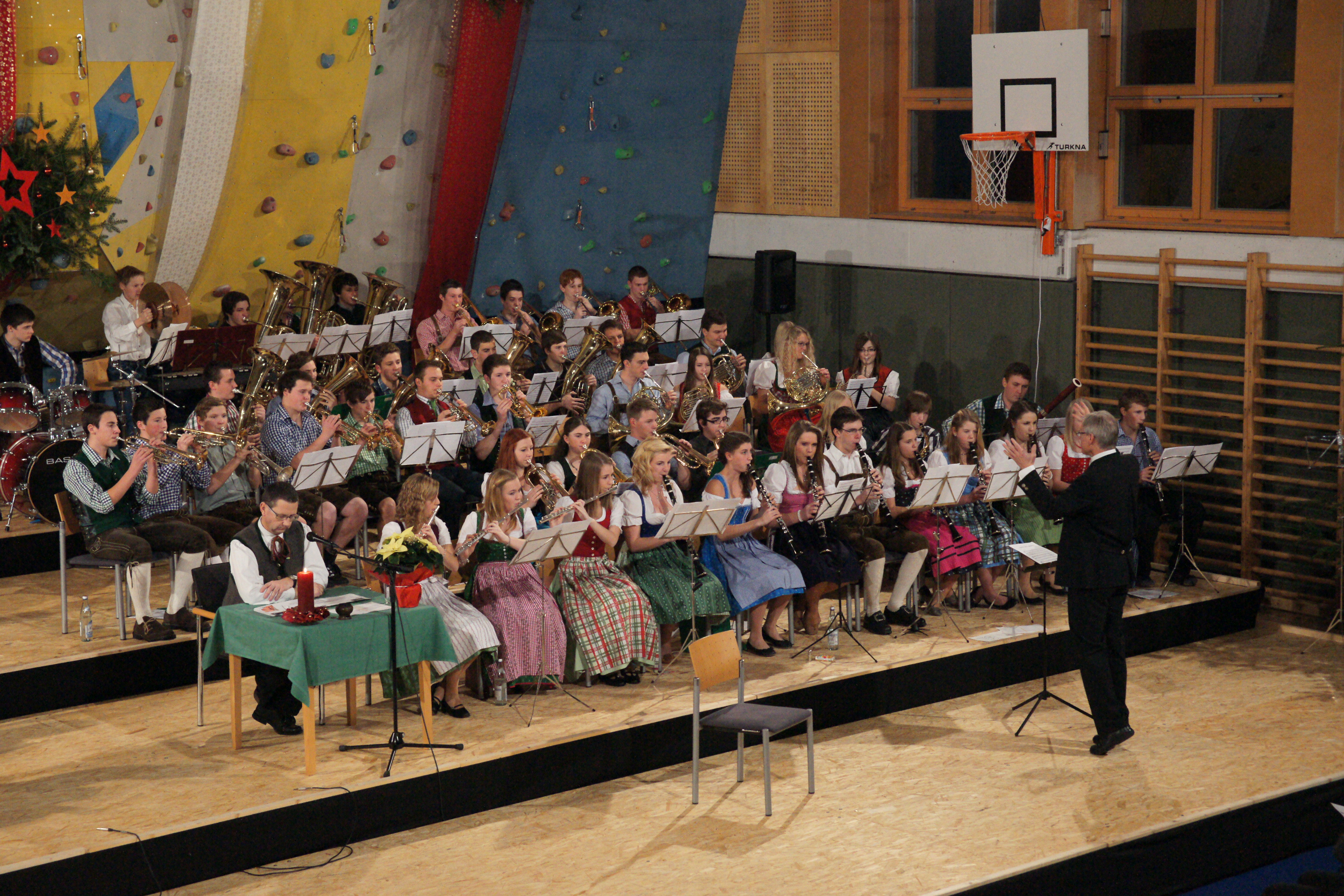
Advent Celebrations at the School

Austrian "Thanksgiving"

It is one of the biggest events during the whole school year. Due to the fact that HLFS Ursprung is rooted in a strong tradition, there is also a mass in school and afterward, all students go to dinner and celebrate together.

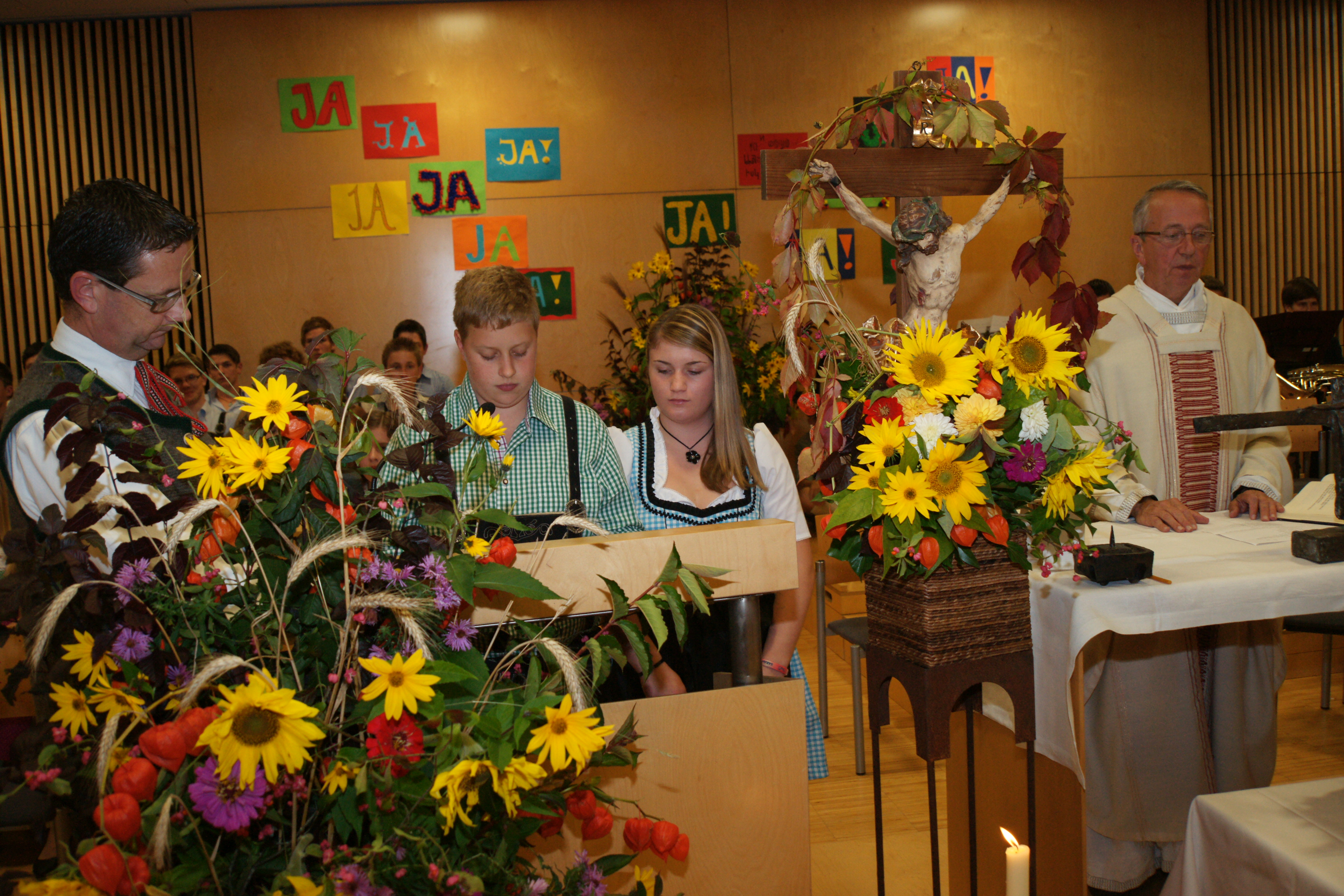
Thanksgiving at Ursprung

"Anklöpfeln"

This is an old tradition in Ursprung. Students go to the village near the school and sing from house to house. The money that is collected is given to a charity project.

Christmas Concert

Celebrating the time before Christmas, the music department of the school invites people to a concert.

Sport

Sports Week

This is a week where the 4th-year students go to a lake or to an ocean to have a week full of exercising and sport.

Ski Course

The students have a chance to go skiing and improve their skills for a whole week in Vorarlberg or Tyrol.

ENIS

The school is part of the European Network of Innovative Schools (ENIS). ENIS is a network of European schools, where information technologies are very important. ENIS currently includes 40 partner schools in Austria, which got the certificate because of their special features and project work. HLFS Ursprung is characterized by the implementation of the specified criteria. The exchange of experience and information at the school level is one of the main objectives of this European network.

"Umweltzeichen"

The "Umweltzeichen" is a certificate that is commissioned by the Federal Ministry of Agriculture and the Ministry of Education. The HLFS Ursprung in particular has environmental and social responsibility. The label for schools is not only just about the eco-standard for the school building or the development of a waste management concept but also about the quality of the learning culture, valuing the social climate at school, and the promotion of student's health. In the kitchen, for example, the food has to be organic, and there is a big animal-welfare priority. The school has to do without chemicals, so cleaners, for instance, are replaced with environmentally-friendly products.

"SLK Bioprüfsiegel"

The SLK GesmbH works on the principles of the "European Standard" and they are responsible for the certification. The aim of organic farming is to produce natural foods under consideration and protection of natural resources such as soil and water. These are based on European production guidelines, which are reviewed and certified by independent monitoring bodies such as the SLK (Salzburger Landwirtschaftliche Kontrolle). The requirement to maintain the label does not end at the school-owned farm, the kitchen too functions according to organic guidelines.

== Notable alumni ==
Martin Legner was born on 17 December 1961 in Tyrol and is the most successful wheelchair-enabled tennis player in Austria. He reached the third place in the world ranking list in 2007. The Tyrolian has won eight double titles (six Australian Open titles and two French Open titles) with Robin Ammerlaan since 2000.
