= Maria Floriani Squarciapino =

Italian classical archaeologist (1917–2003)

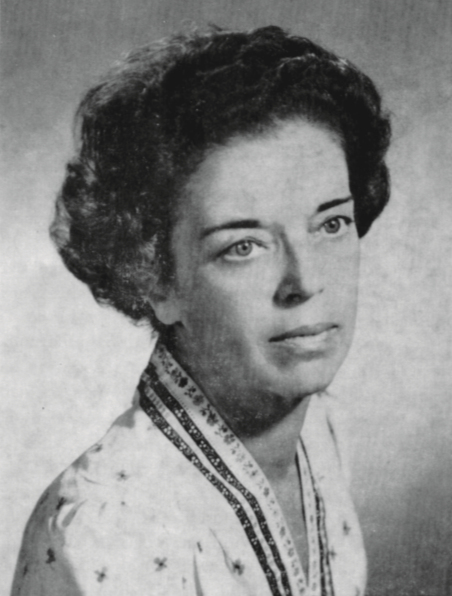
- Born: 30 January 1917; Rome, Italy
- Died: 29 September 2003 (aged 86); Rome, Italy
- Occupation: Archaeologist

Academic work
- Discipline: Roman archaeology
- Institutions: La Sapienza University; Ministry of Cultural Heritage and Activities (Italy)

Maria Floriani Squarciapino (1917–2003) was an Italian classical archaeologist and professor at La Sapienza University in Rome, known for her work on the Roman port city of Ostia.

== Education ==
Squarciapino studied at La Sapienza University in Rome and was a student of Pietro Romanelli, graduating in 1939 with a thesis on the topic of the school of Aphrodisias. She developed an interest in the archaeology of North Africa in the Roman period, and underwent training at the Scuola nazionale di Archeologi.

== Career ==
Squarciapino became an inspector at the Soprintendenza for Ostia in 1946, where she worked closely with Italo Gismondi, Giovanni Becatti, Herbert Bloch and others. After the publication of the excavations of the Ostian necropolis in 1959, she turned her attention to the Ostia Synagogue, where she directed excavations in 1961–62. In 1966, she became the superintendent of the Soprintendenza Archeologica di Ostia and held this position until 1974. During the 1960s and 1970s, she taught at La Sapienza, and in 1974 left the Soprintendenza Archeologica di Ostia to take up a position as Professor of the Archaeology and History of the Roman provinces (Archeologia e Storia delle provincie romane) at La Sapienza, which she held until her retirement in 1987.

As well as her work at Ostia, Squarciapino also participated in excavations elsewhere, including the Roman Forum (1955–57), Leptis Magna, Tell Mardikh (1964–66) and in Albania. A collection of her notes from excavations at Leptis Magna was published by Paola Finocchi in 2012. Squarciapino contributed to the Enciclopedia dell'Arte Antica, Classica e Orientale and led the editorial team at Fasti Archeologici from 1982 to 1997. She was president of the Associazione Internazionale di Archeologia Classica, a member of the Pontificia Accademia Romana di Archeologia, the Istituto Nazionale di Studi Romani and the German Archaeological Institute. In 1997, a special volume of the journal Archaeologica Classica was published in her honour.

== Awards ==
In 1975, Maria Floriani Squarciapino was awarded the Antonio-Feltrinelli Prize, one of the most prestigious scientific awards within Italy.

== Select publications ==
Squarciapino published extensively on Ostia and Roman Archaeology in North Africa, including:

- Artigianato e industria (= Civiltà Romana. Band 20). Colombo, Rome 1942.
- La Scuola di Afrodisia (= Studi e materiali del Museo dell’Impero Romano. Nr. 3). Governatorato di Roma, Rome 1943.
- Il Museo della Via Ostiense (= Itineraria dei Musei e Monumenti d’Italia.) Band 91. Istituto poligrafico dello Stato, Rome 1955.
- ed. with Italo Gismondi: Le tombe di età Repubblicana e Augustea (= Scavi di Ostia. Band 3: I necropoli. Teil 1). Istituto poligrafico dello stato, Rome 1958.
- I Culti orientali ad Ostia. Brill, Leiden 1962.
- Leptis Magna (= Ruinenstädte Nordafrikas. Band 2). Raggi, Basel 1966.
- Sculture del foro severiano di Leptis Magna. «L’Erma» di Bretschneider, Rome 1974.
- Civiltà romana: artigianato e industria.
