= Haslinger =

Haslinger is a surname. Notable people with the surname include:

- Josef Haslinger (priest), priest and Latinist during World War 2
- Josef Haslinger (born 1955), Austrian writer
- Paul Haslinger (born 1962), Austrian-born American composer and musician
- Stewart Haslinger (born 1981), English chess grandmaster
- Tobias Haslinger, Austrian composer and music publisher
