= Pietro Romanelli =

Italian archaeologist

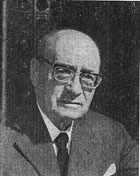
- Born: December 20, 1889; Rome, Italy
- Died: August 3, 1981 (aged 91); Rome, Italy
- Occupation: Archaeologist
- Organizations: Organizer and founder of Academia Latinitati Fovendae; President of the Istituto Nazionale di Studi Romani

Pietro Romanèlli (born in Rome, Italy in 1889 – died in Rome, Italy in 1981) was an Italian archaeologist.

Born in Rome, he carried out excavations at Tarquinia, Ostia Antica, the Palatine Hill in Rome, at the Forum Romanum and at Leptis Magna in Libya. Among his students was the Roman archaeologist and researcher at Ostia Antica Maria Floriani Squarciapino (1917-2003).

== Living Latin ==
Romanelli was fluent in spoken Latin. Scholar Karolis Lyvens says that "apparently [Romanelli] had a penchant for the use of spoken and written Latin for communicating with international colleagues."

In 1966 Romanelli organized an international conference in Rome titled "Congress for the study and use of Latin" (Congresso internazionale per lo studio e l’uso del latino [it]; Omnium gentium ac nationum conventus Latinis litteris linguaeque fovendisto [la]). This conference founded a new learned society with similar goals, which would eventually become the Academia Latinitati Fovendae (ALF). Romanelli led both ALF and the Istituto Nazionale di Studi Romani until just before his death in 1981.

== Necrology ==
- A. M. Colini. "Pietro Romanelli" StRom 30 (1982), 358–65.

== Sources ==
Fabrizio Vistoli, s.v. "Pietro Romanelli", in Dizionario Biografico degli Italiani, vol. 88, Roma, Istituto della Enciclopedia Italiana, 2017, pp. 221–224.
