= Lexicon Recentis Latinitatis =

Latin dictionary

The Lexicon Recentis Latinitatis is a Neo-Latin dictionary providing Latin translations of modern words, published by Vatican scholars since 1992.

Originally issued solely for papal texts, it has gradually become a global reference for translating liturgical textbooks and church documents.

The dictionary was issued by the Latinitas Foundation until it was superseded by the Pontifical Academy for Latin in 2012, with the latest printing dating from 2020.

== Releases ==
=== Italian ===
- Lexicon recentis latinitatis. Urbe Vaticana: Libraria Editoria Vaticana. 1992. ISBN 978-88-209-1731-9. OCLC 27126511.
- Lexicon recentis latinitatis. Urbe Vaticana: Libraria Editoria Vaticana. 2003. ISBN 978-88-209-7454-1. OCLC 248927724.
- Lexicon recentis latinitatis. Urbe Vaticana: Libraria Editoria Vaticana. 2020. ISBN 978-88-266-0470-1. OCLC 1424346950.

=== German ===
- Neues Latein-Lexikon: Lexicon recentis latinitatis. Urbe Vaticana: Libraria Editoria Vaticana. 2004. ISBN 978-3-933070-01-2. OCLC 76518892.
- Neues Latein-Lexikon: Lexicon recentis latinitatis (E-Book). Urbe Vaticana: Libraria Editoria Vaticana. 2011. ISBN 978-3-939284-21-5. OCLC 863912792.
