= Orazio Antonio Bologna =

Italian classical philologist

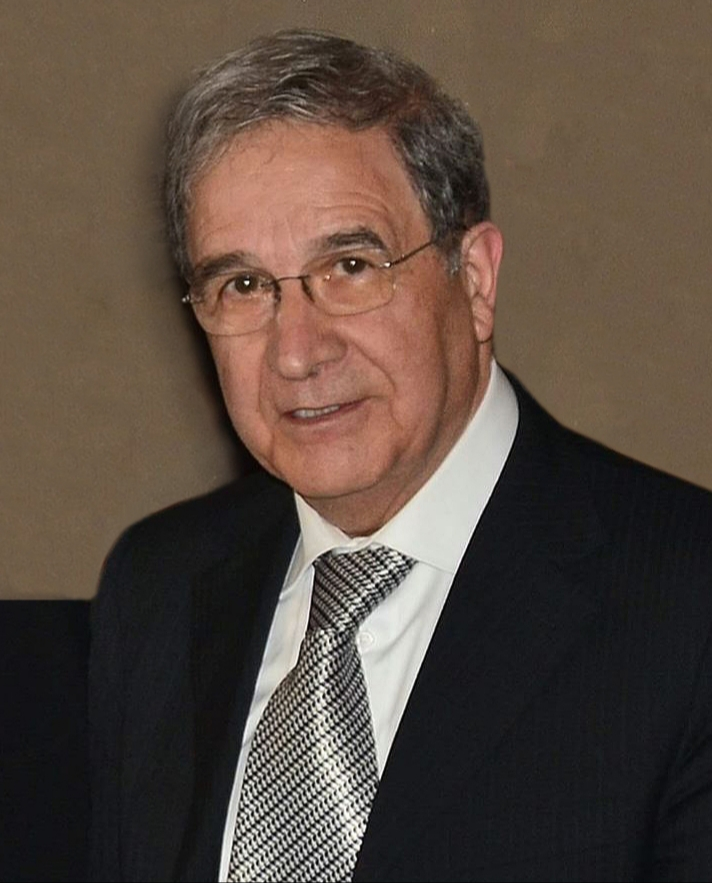
- Born: June 8, 1945 (age 81); Pago Veiano, Italy
- Education: University of Naples Federico II (PhD, 1975); Pontifical Superior Institute for Latin
- Occupations: Classical philologist; poet; professor
- Employer: Salesian Pontifical University
- Known for: Latin poetry and composition; Manfredi di Svevia studies; Research on Mesopotamian influence on Greek myths; Dialectology of Pago Veiano
- Awards: Honourable mention from Istituto di Studi Romani (2019)

Orazio Antonio Bologna (born 8 June 1945) is an Italian classical philologist, and poet writing in Latin and fabulist of life.

== Biography ==
Bologna was born in Pago Veiano. He studied at the University of Naples Federico II and graduated in 1975 with title of doctor. Several years later, Bologna graduated from the Pontifical Superior Institute for Latin (Latin: Pontificium Institutum Altioris Latinitatis).

He became a deacon in 1970 but was refused ordination to the priesthood.

From 1975 to 2010 Bologna was teaching Latin and Greek in various Roman high schools, the last one being Giulio Cesare Classical High School. Since 2001 at the age of 56 he has been an Visiting Professor of Latin composition, and Latin as well as Green literature and metric at the Salesian Pontifical University in Rome.

He is a Vice President of the Collectanea Philologica periodical published at the University of Lodz. As of 2023 he is no longer a member (exclusion) of Pontifical Academy for Latin.

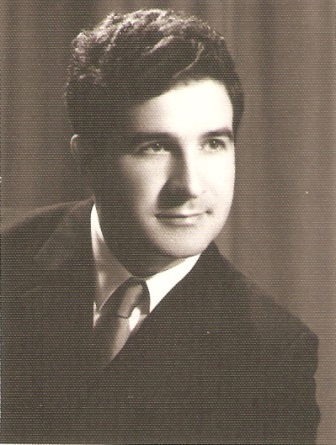
Orazio Antonio Bologna

== Publications ==
In 1975, he published Archiloco, Poggobonsi OCLC 491147400

In 2010, he published Manfredi tra scomunica e redenzione, Sentieri Meridiani, Foggia ISBN 978-88-95210-49-0

In 2013, he published Manfredi di Svevia. Impero e Papato nella concezione di Dante, LAS, Rome ISBN 978-88-213-0992-2

In 2014, he published Pontifici sit Musa dicata Pio, Rome ISBN 978-88-6788-028-7

In 2017, he published Gonzagide, an epic poem in 4 books (15th century), Viella, Rome ISBN 978-88-6728-825-0 – the volume received an honourable mention from Istituto di Studi Romani in 2019.

In 2018, he published Alle falde d'Elicona. Influssi mesopotamici sui miti greci, IF Press, Rome ISBN 978-88-6788-153-6

In 2019, he published Dizionario pajàno-italiano, Rome ISBN 978-88-6788-174-1

In 2020, he published Dialetto di Pago Veiano - Grammatica normativa; Fergen; ISBN 978-88-98509-31-7

In 2021, he published Dialetto di Pago Veiano - Lessico ortoepico e ortografico con cenni di vita e costumanze locali; Fergen, ISBN 978-88-98509-40-9

In 2021, he published La Divina Commedia - Le terzine più famose, Fergen; ISBN 978-88-98509-35-5

In 2021, he published Dal Corano alla Divina Commedia; Diarkos ISBN 978-88-3616-105-8

In 2022, he published Carmina Latina - Vita poesi dicata; Viella ISBN 979-12-5469-187-8

His Latin and Italian works are also published in:

- Archivum Anatolicum, Ankara University
- Sallesianum, Salesian Pontifical University
- Collectanea Philologica, University of Lodz
- Latinitas, old and new series
- Vox Latina
- Supplementa Humanistica Lovaniensia
- Some of his poems are also collected in Modern Latin Poetry – Poematia Moderna
