= Manlio Sodi =

Italian Salesian priest, theologian and liturgist

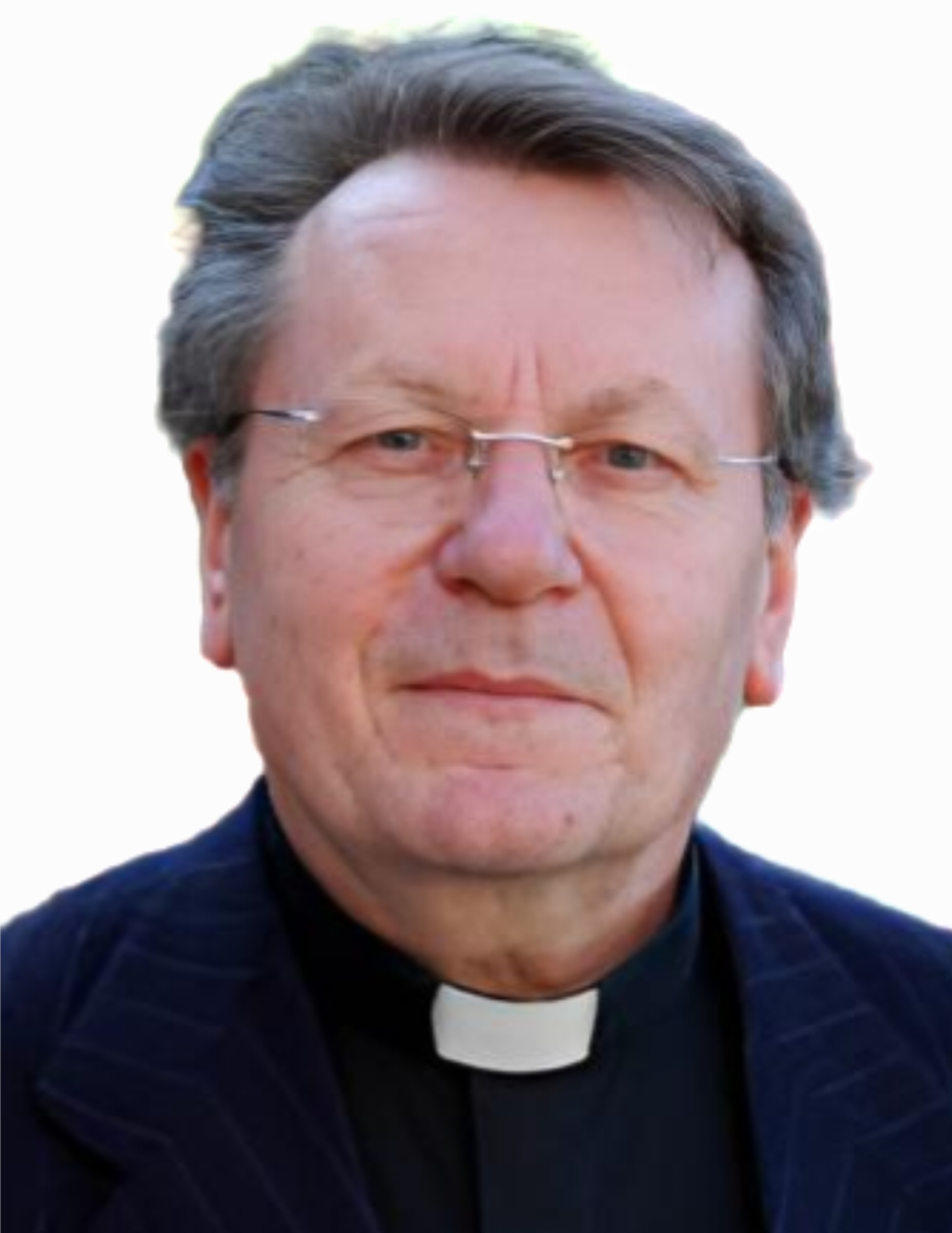
Manlio Sodi

Manlio Sodi (22 January 1944) is an Italian priest, theologian and liturgist and is an Ordinary professor emeritus of the Salesian Pontifical University. He resides in the diocese of Montepulciano-Chiusi-Pienza. Sodi is the author of dictionaries, editor of series and periodicals, with numerous studies and articles published in Italian and foreign journals.

== Biography ==
Sodi was born in Sinalunga. He received his doctorate in Liturgy from the Anselmianum (The Pontifical Athenaeum Sant'Anselmo) in 1978.

He was a full professor at the Salesian Pontifical University (UPS) and from 1999 to 2005 he was Dean, Dean and Holder of the Chair of Liturgy, Sacramentary and Homiletics at the same Salesian Pontifical University. In the years 2011-2014 he became the Dean in the Faculty of Christian and Classical Letters (FLCC in Latin Facultas Litterarum Christianarum et Classicarum) at the Pontifical Institute of Latin (in Latin Pontificium Institutum Altioris Latinitatis) of the Salesian Pontifical University in Rome. At the Pontifical Lateran University in Vatican City in 2015 - 2018 he was the director of the Department of Classical and Modern Languages. Between 2009 and 2014 he was also the President of the Pontifical Academy of Theology.

He was a visiting professor at the University of Silesia (Katowice in Poland), at the Pontifical Lateran University, at the Pontifical University of the Holy Cross in Rome, at the University of Urbino (from 2001 to 2020) and since 2020 at the Theological Faculty of Central Italy in Florence. He was a Consultor of the Congregation for Divine Worship and the Discipline of the Sacraments from 1984 to 1999 and then the Consultor of the Office for the Liturgical Celebrations of the Supreme Pontiff from 1994 to 2008. He was the Editor of Rivista Liturgica in the years 1997 - 2015 and then from 2009 - 2020 became Editor of the journal Path of the Pontifical Academy of Theology. He is a member of the Scientific Committee of Hermeneutica (yearbook of philosophy and theology) of the Higher Institute of Religious Sciences of the University of Urbino and a member of the Pontifical Academy for Latin.

== Main work ==
- Liturgia e musica nella formazione salesiana, SDB, 1984
- Anno liturgico: itinerario di fede e di vita a cura di M. Sodi e G. Morante, Elledici, Leumann, ISBN 8801101295, 1988
- Con Maria verso Cristo. Messe della Beata Vergine Maria, San Paolo Edizioni, ISBN 8821518825, 1990
- Giovani, liturgia e musica, LAS, ISBN 8821302954, 1994
- Famiglia Salesiana in preghiera. Testi per la celebrazione dell'Eucaristia e della Liturgia delle Ore, Direzione Generale Opere Don Bosco, 1995
- Pontificale Romanum. Editio princeps (1595-1596) a cura di M. Sodi e A.M. Triacca, Libreria Editrice Vaticana, ISBN 8820981351, 1997
- Con María hacia Cristo: Misas de la Virgen María, Centre de Pastoral Litúrgica, ISBN 8474674379, 1997
- Missale Romanum. Editio princeps (1570) a cura di M. Sodi e A.M. Triacca, Libreria Editrice Vaticana, ISBN 8820925478, 1998, ²2012
- Dizionario di Omiletica a cura di M. Sodi e A.M. Triacca, Elledici, Velar, Leumann, Gorle, 1998, ²2002, ³2013
- Breviarium Romanum. Editio princeps (1568) a cura di M. Sodi e A.M. Triacca, Libreria Editrice Vaticana ISBN 882092868X, 1999, ²2012
- Caeremoniale Episcoporum. Editio princeps (1600) a cura di M. Sodi e A.M. Triacca, Libreria Editrice Vaticana ISBN 8820970651, 2000
- Il rito e il messaggio, Piemme, ISBN 8838447195, 2000
- Pellegrini alla porta della misericordia, Edizioni Messaggero, 2000
- La parola di Dio nella celebrazione eucaristica-The word of God in the eucaristic celebration. Tavole sinottiche-Synoptic tables. Ediz. bilingue, Libreria Editrice Vaticana, ISBN 8820924463, 2000
- Graduale de Tempore iuxta ritum sacrosanctae Romanae Ecclesiae. Editio princeps (1614) a cura di M. Sodi e G. Baroffio, Libreria Editrice Vaticana ISBN 882097116X, 2001
- Concordantia et Indices Missalis Romani. Editio typica tertia a cura di M. Sodi e A. Toniolo, Libreria Editrice Vaticana, ISBN 8820973537, 2002
- Il latino e i cristiani. Un bilancio all'inizio del terzo millennio a cura di M. Sodi e E. Dal Covolo, Libreria Editrice Vaticana ISBN 8820973154, 2002
- “Actuosa participatio”. Conoscere, comprendere e vivere la Liturgia. Studi in onore del Prof. Domenico Sartore, a cura di M. Sodi e A. Montan, ISBN 9788820972653, 2002
- Praenotanda Missalis Romani. Textus, concordantia, appendices. Editio typica tertia a cura di M. Sodi e A. Toniolo, Libreria Editrice Vaticana, ISBN 8820974525, 2003
- Tra maleficio, patologie e possessione demoniaca. Teologia e pastorale dell'esorcismo, EMP, ISBN 8825012861, 2003
- Rituale Romanum. Editio princeps (1614) a cura di M. Sodi e J.J. Flores Arcas, Libreria Editrice Vaticana, ISBN 8820974363, 2004
- Pietà popolare e liturgia. Teologia – Spiritualità – Catechesi – Cultura a cura di M. Sodi e G. La Torre, Libreria Editrice Vaticana, ISBN 9788820976095, 2004
- Martyrologium Romanum. Editio princeps (1584) a cura di M. Sodi e R. Fusco, Libreria Editrice Vaticana, ISBN 8820976757, 2005
- L'utopia dell'Oasi Città Aperta. Percorsi culturali per un rinnovato umanesimo sociale a cura di M. Sodi e B. Amata, Troina, 2005, ²2008
- Il “Pontificalis liber” di Agostino Patrizi Piccolomini e Giovanni Burcardo (1485), Libreria Editrice Vaticana, ISBN 8820976196, 2006
- Testimoni del Risorto. Martiri e Santi di ieri e di oggi nel Martirologio Romano, Edizioni Messaggero, ISBN 9788825017168, 2006
- «Ubi Petrus ibi Ecclesia». Sui “sentieri” del Concilio Vaticano II. Miscellanea offerta a S.S. Benedetto XVI in occasione del suo 80° genetliaco, Libreria Editrice Vaticana ISBN 9788821306419, 2007
- Il messale di Pio V. In latino la messa del III millennio?, EMP, ISBN 8825019467, 2007
- Enea Silvio Piccolomini. Pius Secundus Poeta Laureatus Pontifex Maximus a cura di M. Sodi e A. Antoniutti, Ed. Shakespeare and Company2 – Libreria Editrice Vaticana ISBN 8820979365, 2007
- Missale romanum editio typica Editio typica (1962), Libreria Editrice Vaticana, ISBN 8820979659, 2007
- Introduzione alla Liturgia - Nozioni fondamentali Anno Liturgico - Liturgia delle Ore, UPS, 2007
- Ordinamento generale del Lezionario Romano. Annunciare, celebrare e vivere la parola di Dio, Edizioni Messaggero, 2007, ²2014
- Rituale romanum. Editio typica 1952 a cura di M. Sodi e A. Toniolo, Libreria Editrice Vaticana, ISBN 8820980703, 2008
- Il metodo teologico. Tradizione, innovazione, comunione in Cristo, Libreria Editrice Vaticana, ISBN 8820980797, 2008
- Pontificale Romanum. Editio typica 1961-1962 a cura di M. Sodi e A. Toniolo, Libreria Editrice Vaticana, ISBN 8820981351, 2008
- Sui sentieri di Paolo. La sfida dell'educazione tra fede e cultura, Libreria Editrice Vaticana, ISBN 9788821307188, 2009
- La Penitenzieria Apostolica e il sacramento della Penitenza. Percorsi storici, giuridici, teologici e prospettive pastorali a cura di M. Sodi e J. Ickx, Libreria Editrice Vaticana, ISBN 8820982447, 2009
- Astronomia e culto. Risposte a domande di attualità, EMP, ISBN 8825021453, 2009
- Breviarium Romanum. Totum. Editio typica 1961 a cura di M. Sodi e A. Toniolo, Libreria Editrice Vaticana, ISBN 8820981602, 2009
- Paolo di Tarso. Tra kerygma, cultus e vita a cura di M. Sodi e P.O' Callaghan, Libreria Editrice Vaticana, ISBN 8821302954, 2009
- “Aurum est ipsa Divinitas”. Un dialogo tra culture e religioni all'insegna dell'oro a cura di M. Sodi e G. Colaiacovo, Libreria Editrice Vaticana, Velar, Gorle ISBN 9788871354583, 2009
- Rituale Sacramentorum Francisci de Sales Episcopi Gebennensis iussu editum anno 1612 a cura di M. Sodi e M. Wirth, Libreria Editrice Vaticana, ISBN 9788820983697, 2010
- Rites de Communion Conférences Saint-Serge. Le Semaine d'Études Liturgiques (Paris, 23-26 juin 2008) a cura di M. Sodi e A. Lossky, Libreria Editrice Vaticana, ISBN 8820984083, 2010
- Sine Dominico non possumus. Itinerario formativo per universitari nel rapporto tra culto e cultura. Anno pastorale 2010-2011, CLV, ISBN 8873671276, 2010
- Liturgia Tridentina. Fontes – Indices – Concordantia (1568-1962) a cura di M. Sodi, A. Toniolo e P. Bruylants, Libreria Editrice Vaticana, ISBN 978-88-209-8448-9, 2010
- Dicionário de homilética a cura di M. Sodi e A.M. Triacca, Paulus, Loyola, ISBN 8515037297, 2010
- Theo-loghìa. Risorsa dell'Universitas scientiarum, Lateran University Press, ISBN 8846507649, 2011
- Calix et Crux. Dalla "coppa" per la vita alla Croce sorgente di salvezza a cura di M. Sodi G. Colaiacovo, M. Luri, R. Bracchi, Elledici, Velar, Leumann, ISBN 8871357078, 2011
- “Aurum est ipsa divinitas”. Un diálogo entre culturas y religiones bajo el signo del oro a cura di M. Sodi e G. Colaiacovo, Libreria Editrice Vaticana, Velar, Gorle 2011
- Faire memoire. L'anamnèse dans la liturgie a cura di M. Sodi e A. Lossky, Libreria Editrice Vaticana, ISBN 8820986051, 2011
- La penitenza tra I e II millennio. Per una comprensione delle origini della penitenzieria apostolica a cura di M. Sodi e R. Salvarani, Libreria Editrice Vaticana, ISBN 8820986493, 2012
- Sacramentarium gregorianum concordantia a cura di M. Sodi, G. Baroffio, A. Toniolo, LAS, ISBN 8821308464, 2012
- La liturgie témoin de l'Église a cura di M. Sodi e A. Lossky, Libreria Editrice Vaticana, ISBN 8820986507, 2012
- «Relazione»? Una categoria che interpella a cura di M. Sodi e L. Clavell, Libreria Editrice Vaticana, ISBN 8820988933, 2012
- Vox clamantis in deserto. San Giovanni Battista tra arte, storia e fede a cura di M. Sodi, A. Antoniutti, B. Treffers, Libreria Editrice Vaticana, Shakespeare and Company2, ISBN 8820991780, 2013
- Veterum sapientia. Storia, cultura, attualità a cura di M. Sodi, L. Miraglia, R. Spataro, LAS, ISBN 8821308588, 2013
- Missale monasticum secundum consuetudinem Vallisumbrosae. Editio princeps (1503) a cura di M. Sodi, G. Baroffio, F. Salvestrini, Libreria Editrice Vaticana, ISBN 9788820990961, 2013
- La penitenza tra Gregorio VII e Bonifacio VIII. Teologia, pastorale, istituzioni a cura di M. Sodi, R. Rusconi, A. Saraco, Libreria Editrice Vaticana, ISBN 8820991101, 2013
- Sacramentarium Veronense Concordantia a cura di M. Sodi, A. Toniolo, G. Baroffio, LAS, ISBN 8821308839, 2013
- Pienza. Il cielo in cattedrale a cura di M. Sodi e N. Petreni, Velar, Ldc, Società Bibliografica Toscana, Gorle, ISBN 8871358163, 2013
- Liturgia e pietà popolare. Prospettive per la Chiesa e la cultura nel tempo della nuova Evangelizzazione, Libreria Editrice Vaticana, ISBN 8820990105, 2013
- “In herbis medicina et salus”. Dalla natura il ben-èssere tra salute e bellezza a cura di M. Sodi, G. Monacelli, S. Tavella, Velar, Gorle, ISBN 8871359011, 2013
- Tra etica e impresa la persona al centro. Parabole e metafore alla luce della Caritas in veritate e della Lumen fidei a cura di M. Sodi, R. Maradiaga O.A., G. Colaiacovo, If Press, ISBN 9788867880133, 2013
- Teología litúrgica : métodos y perspectivas, Centre de Pastoral Litúrgica a cura di M. Sodi, F. M. Arocena, D. W. Fogerberg, B. Migut, Centre de Pastoral Litúrgica, ISBN 8498056144, 2013
- La teologia liturgica tra itinerari e prospettive. L'economia sacramentale in dialogo vitale con la scienza della fede a cura di M. Sodi e D. Medeiros, If Press, ISBN 9788867880270, 2014
- Divorzi, nuove nozze, convivenze. Quale accompagnamento ministeriale e pastorale? a cura di M. Sodi e K. Nykiel, If Press, ISBN 8867880373, 2014
- Penitenza e Penitenzieria tra umanesimo e rinascimento. Dottrine e prassi dal Trecento agli inizi dell'Età moderna (1300-1517) a cura di M. Sodi, A. Manfredi, R.Rusconi, Libreria Editrice Vaticana, ISBN 9788820994372, 2014
- Entre ética y empresa la persona en el centro. Parábolas y metáforas a la luz de la Caritas in veritate y de la Lumen fidei, a cura di M. Sodi, R. Maradiaga O.A., G. Colaiacovo, If Press, ISBN 8867880403, 2014
- Anima e psiche. Percorsi per un dialogo a cura di M. Sodi e S. Tavella, If Press, ISBN 8867880195, 2014
- Sacramentarium Gelasianum Concordantia a cura di M. Sodi, G. Baroffio, A. Toniolo, LAS, ISBN 8821311600, 2014
- Ordinamento generale del lezionario romano. Annunciare, celebrare e vivere la parola di Dio, EMP; ISBN 8825038569, 2014
- Continuiamo a “camminare insieme” per educarci alla “vita buona del Vangelo”, Parrocchia “San Pietro”, Abbadia di Montepulciano, 2014
- Leone I e Gregorio I - Attualità di due “grandi” promotori di cultur Lateran University Press, ISBN 8846510224, 2015
- Educare la coscienza: sfida possibile? Dai “luoghi” privilegiati ai contesti più variegati: la missione del formatore a cura di M. Sodi, K. Nykiel, P. Carlotti, If Press, ISBN 8867880551, 2015
- Quaresima e Pasqua 2015: “tempo favorevole” per la Comunità dell'Abbadia?, Abbadia di Montepulciano, 2015
- Liturgia y pietad popular. Perspectivas para la Iglesia y la cultura en el tiempo de la nueva Evangelización a cura di M. Sodi e D. Castillo, Universidad Católica de Cuenca, Quito, 2015
- La formazione morale della persona nel sacramento della Riconciliazione a cura di M. Sodi et alii, If Press, ISBN 8867880691, 2015
- Omiletica e comunicazione nella liturgia a cura di M. Sodi e Collaboratori, Pontificia Universitas Lateranensis, 2016
- Sacramentari e messali pretridentini di provenienza italiana. Guida ai manoscritti a cura di M. Sodi, G. Baroffio e A. Suski, Lateran University Press, ISBN 8846510720, 2016
- Descendit Christus, descendit et Spiritus. L'iniziazione in Ambrogio da Milano a cura di M. Sodi e A. Toniolo, Lateran University Press, ISBN 8846510739, 2016
- Peccato – Misericordia – Riconciliazione. Dizionario Teologico-Pastorale a cura di M. Sodi et alii, Libreria Editrice Vaticana, ISBN 8820998572, 2016
- Penitenza e Penitenzieria nel “secolo” del Concilio di Trento. Prassi e dottrine in un mondo più largo (1517-1614) a cura di M. Sodi e A. Saraco, Libreria Editrice Vaticana, ISBN 8820998009, 2016
- Pensare con i giovani? La Comunità dell'Abbadia nel contesto poliziano, Diocesi di Montepulciano-Chiusi-Pienza, 2016
- Il sacramento della Riconciliazione “porta santa” della misericordia a cura di M. Sodi et alii, If Press, ISBN 8867881027, 2017
- Arte pittorica del Cinque-Seicento Toscano in area poliziana a cura di M. Sodi e Collaboratori, Società Bibliografica Toscana, 2017
- La predicazione dei padri della Chiesa. Una tradizione sempre attuale a cura di M. Sodi e R. Ronzani, Lateran University Press, ISBN 8846511751, 2017
- Sacramentari gregoriani. Guida ai manoscritti e concordanza verbale a cura di M. Sodi, A.W. Suski, A. Toniolo, Lateran University Press, ISBN 8846511778, 2018
- Messali manoscritti pretridentini (secc. VIII‐XVI). Catalogo a cura di M. Sodi e A.W. Suski Libreria Editrice Vaticana, ISBN 8826602514, 2019
- Pontificali pretridentini (secc. IX-XVI). Guida ai manoscritti e concordanza verbale a cura di M. Sodi, A.W. Suski, A. Toniolo, Wydawnictwo Naukowe Uniwersytetu Milołaja Kopernika, ISBN 978-83-231-4201-0, 2019
- Sufficit Gratia Mea. Cristologia. Mariologia. Ecclesiologia. Liturgia. Agiologia. Cultura. Miscellanea di studi offerti a Sua Em. il Card. Angelo Amato in occasione del suo 80° genetliaco, Libreria Editrice Vaticana, ISBN 8826603480, 2019
- Il Natale nella sapienza dei proverbi. Con una Lettera di papa Francesco sul Presepe, If Press, ISBN 8867882236, 2020
- Gratianus Magister Decretorum. Il Decretum tra storia, attualità e prospettive di universalità a cura di M. Sodi e F. Reali, Bibliotheca Apostolica Vaticana, ISBN 9788821010569, 2020
- Sacramentario Gregoriano. Testo latino-italiano e commento a cura di M. Sodi, O.A. Bologna, R. Presenti, A. Toniolo, Edusc, ISBN 8883339738, 2021
- Roberto Bellarmino (san) - Il catechismo. Breve dottrina cristiana e dichiarazione più copiosa a cura di M. Sodi, A. Głusiuk, G. Mignoni, Morcelliana, ISBN 8837235585, 2021
- Da Gerusalemme a Roma… Il Vangelo incontra popoli e culture. “Lectio divina” sugli Atti degli Apostoli per l'anno pastorale, eucaristico e sinodale 2021-2022 a cura dell'Animazione Biblica Diocesana e dell'Ufficio per la Pastorale della Cultura = Quaderni dell'Animazione Biblica Diocesana XIX, Edizione extra commerciale, 2021
- Omelia e predicazione Sfide e responsabilità pastorali tra celebrazione e ministerialità a cura di M. Sodi e E. DAL Covolo Rogate, ISBN 888075498X, 2021
- Lo riconobbero nello spezzare il pane... Lectio divina sul mistero eucaristico, San Paolo Edizioni, ISBN 8892224905, 2021
- «Verbum caro». Miscellanea offerta a Sua Em. il Card. Gianfranco Ravasi in occasione del suo 80° genetliaco, San Paolo Edizioni, ISBN 8892228986, 2022
- Bellarmino e i Gesuiti a Montepulciano. Studi in occasione del IV centenario della morte di San Roberto (1621-2021) a cura di M. Sodi e A. Głusiuk, Olschki, ISBN 8822268202, 2022
- San Bernardino da Siena. Un predicatore per ogni tempo a cura di M. Sodi et alii, Società Bibliografica Toscana, 2022
- Liber qui dicitur ordinarius. Inventario dei manoscritti a cura di M. Sodi, A.W. Suski, G. Brusa, Edusc, ISBN 979-1254820254, 2022
- Radicati in quella Parola che, sola, dà vita. “Lectio divina” per l'anno pastorale 2022-2023 a cura dell'Animazione Biblica Diocesana e dell'Ufficio per la Pastorale della Cultura, edizione extra commerciale, Montepulciano 2022
- La reliquia di Sant'Andrea. Da Patrasso a Pienza e il suo ritorno a Patrasso a cura di M. Sodi et alii, 2022
- Spes mea unica. Miscellanea offerta a Sua Ecc. Mons. Andrzej W. Suski primo vescovo della diocesi di Toruń in occasione del Suo 80° genetliaco a cura di M. Sodi e D. Brzeziński, Edusc, ISBN 979-1254821008, 2022
- Pienza. Il Cielo in Cattedrale. Presentazione di S. Em. il Card. Augusto Paolo Lojudice, Vescovo di Montepulciano Chiusi Pienza a cura di M. Sodi e N. Petreni Velar, 2023
- Da Gerusalemme a Roma... Il Vangelo incontra popoli e culture - Lectio divina sugli Atti di Apostoli, San Paolo Edizioni, ISBN 978-88-922-4419-1, 2024
- Europa ENEA SILVIO PICCOLOMINI - PAPA PIO II (De Europa, 1458-1461), a cura di M. Sodi e A. Zanardi Landi, If Press, ISBN 978-88-6788-354-7, 2024
- Asia ENEA SILVIO PICCOLOMINI - PAPA PIO II (De Asia, 1461), a cura di M. Sodi e R. Presenti, If Press, ISBN 978-88-6788-360-8, 2024
- Il Pastore di Erma. Traduzione “Vulgata”, Concordanza, Bibliografia = Veritatem inquirere 18, pp. 259, A.W. Suski – P. Cecconi – M. Sodi – A. Toniolo (edd.), Edusc, ISBN 979-12-5482-319-4, 2024
- Collectio Missarum de Beata Maria Virgine. Introduzione, testo, concordanza, commento = Veritatem inquirere 19, pp. 247, M. Sodi – A. Toniolo – D. Medeiros, Edusc, EAN 9791254823613, 2025
- Una Parola viva ed efficace. Tra annuncio, celebrazione e vita = Sentieri della Parola 3, pp. 188, Manlio Sodi, Edusc, ISBN 979-12-5482-388-0, 2025
- Maestri, Musica in rosso e nero. Brumana – M. Sodi – P. Tiezzi Libri liturgici dal Cinquecento in poi = Il Moreni 26, pp. 111; in particolare le pp. 22–45: Società Bibliografica Toscana, Sinalunga (Siena), 2025
- Liber orationum Psalmographus. Le orazioni salmiche della liturgia ispanica. Testo e concordanza verbale editi in occasione del 70° genetliaco del prof. Felix Maria Arocena [...] = Veritatem inquirere 20, pp. 553 - Gutierrez J.L.- M. Sodi – A. Toniolo – I. Esparza Lezaun Edusc, ISBN 979-12-5482-374-3, Roma 2025
- “Eritis mihi testes” (At 1,8). Cultura, teologia, storia. Miscellanea di studi offerta a S.E. Mons. Enrico dal Covolo in occasione del Suo 75° genetliaco. Presentazione di A. Melloni = Veritatem inquirere 23, pp. 647 - Sodi M. – M. Trizzino (edd.), ISBN 979-12-5482-453-5, Roma 2025
- Giuseppe Pannilini (1742-1823): un vescovo giansenista? = Sapientia ineffabilis 50, G. Mignoni – S. Negruzzo – M. Sodi, IF Press, Roma 2025, pp. 238, ISBN 978-88-6788-419-3, Roma 2025
- Orationes super Psalmos et Cantica. Il canto dei Salmi e dei Cantici si arricchisce con la preghiera della Chiesa, M. Sodi - A. Toniolo - G. Zaccaria (edd.), Veritatem inquirere 24, Edusc, pp. 235, Roma 2025

== Collective work ==
- Dizionario di Liturgia, San Paolo, Cinisello B. 1984 [tr. Spagnola, portoghese e francese]; ²2001
- Dizionario di Catechetica, Elle Di Ci, Leumann 1986 [tr. Spagnola 1987]
- Dizionario di pastorale giovanile, Elle Di Ci, Leumann 1989, ²1992
- Dizionario di Spiritualità biblico-patristica, Borla, Roma 1996
- Dizionario di Scienze dell'Educazione, Elle Di Ci, Sei, Las, Leumann-Torino-Roma 1997; Las, Roma 2008 [tr. spagnola 2009]
- Dizionario di Teologia della Pace, Dehoniane, Bologna 1997
- Dizionario di Mistica, Lev, Città del Vaticano 1998
- Dizionario di scienze e tecniche della comunicazione, Elle Di Ci – Rai – Eri – Las, Roma – Torino 2002
- Dizionario Teologico sul Sangue di Cristo, Lev, Città del Vaticano 2007
- Dizionario di Ecclesiologia, Città Nuova, Roma 2010
- Diccionario General de Derecho Canónico, Editorial Aranzadi, Pamplona 2012

== Bibliography ==
- Frère Patrick Prétot, « L'œuvre éditoriale du Professeur Manlio Sodi, s.d.b. », La Maison-Dieu, nº 270, juin 2012, pp. 169–176
- B. Migut, « Teologia liturgiczna szkoły rzymskiej » [Teologia liturgica della scuola romana], Wydawnictwo KUL, Lublin 2007
- D. Medeiros, Introduzione a ID. (ed), « Sacrificium et canticum laudis » Parola Eucaristica, Liturgia delle Ore, Vita della Chiesa. Miscellanea Liturgica offerta al prof. Manlio Sodi in occasione del suo 70° genetliaco, Itineraria 10, Lev, Città del Vaticano 2014, pp. 9–14, e pp. 513–560 (bio-bibliografia).
- Liturgicum mysterium colendum semperque fovendum. Miscellanea offerta al prof. Manlio Sodi in occasione del suo 80° genetliaco, Edusc, 2024
