= Gmachl =

German hotel

Coordinates: 47.868°N 13.0672°E

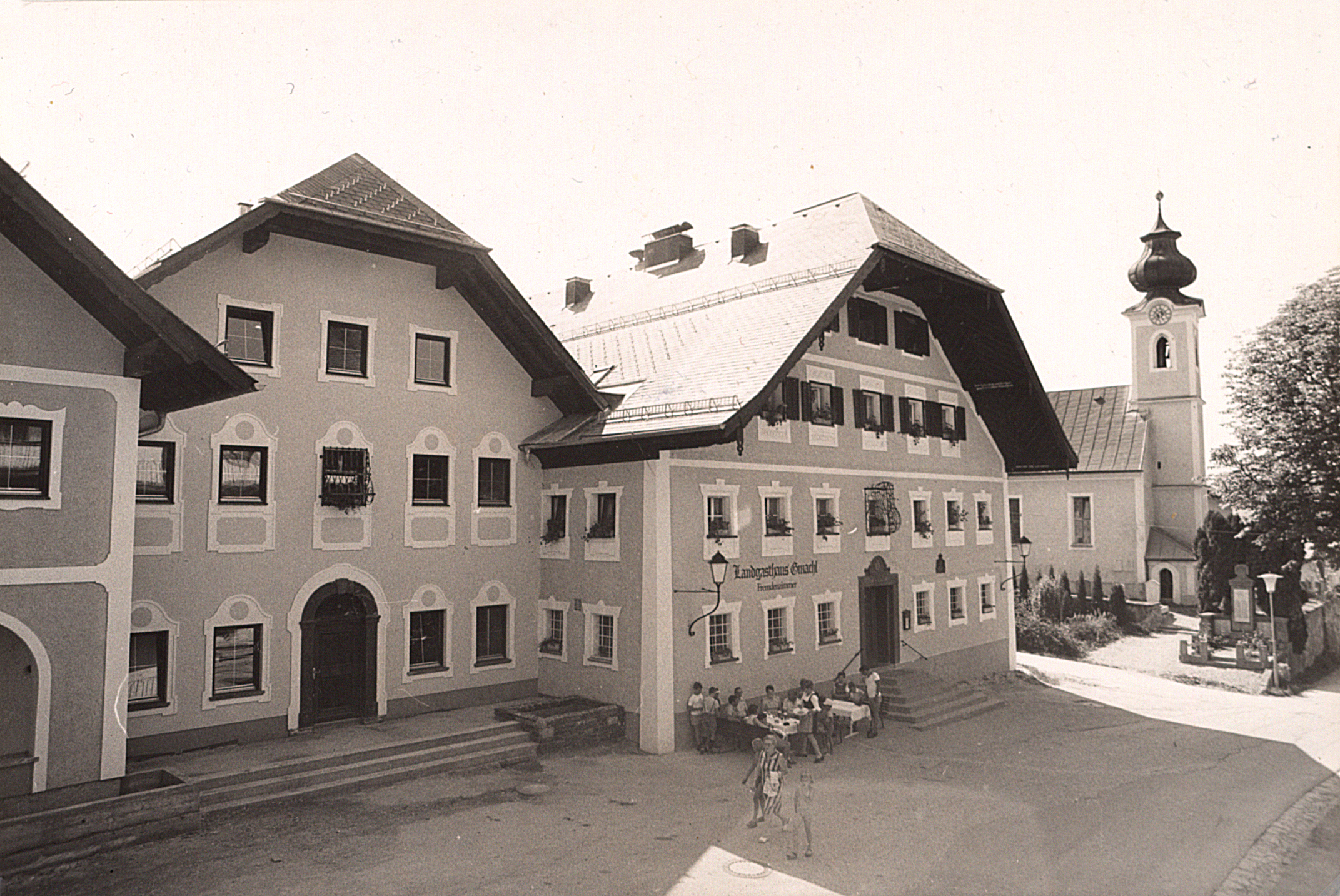
Gmachl, c. 1920s—1930s

Gmachl is a hotel in Elixhausen, Salzburg, Austria. The hotel has more than 70 guest rooms, a spa area, an outdoor area for summer and winter activities, a butchery and a tennis park.

== History ==
Gmachl was founded in 1334 making it one of the oldest companies in Austria. The business is now run by Michaela Gmachl.
