= Aloysian College, Austria =

- German: Kollegium Aloisianum

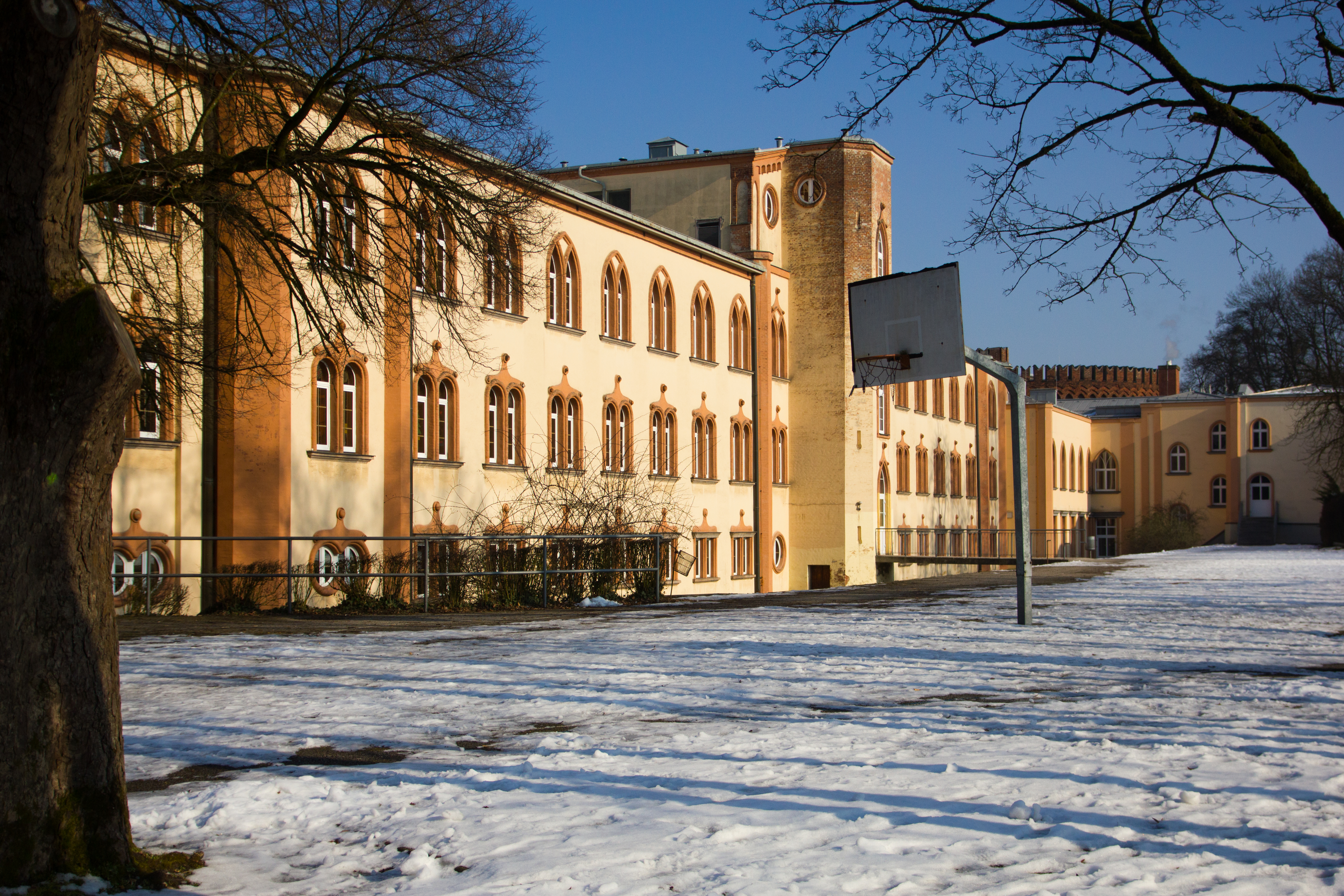

Location
- Freinbergstraße, Linz; Austria
- Coordinates: 48°17′46″N 14°16′7″E

Information
- Type: Private secondary school / Gymnasium and Realgymnasium
- Religious affiliation: Catholicism
- Denomination: Jesuits
- Established: 1912; 114 years ago
- Principal: Karl Hödl
- Teaching staff: 55 (2015/16)
- Gender: Coeducational
- Previous use: St. Aloysius Jesuit Seminary
- Website: www.kollegiumaloisianum.at

The Aloysian College (German: Kollegium Aloisianum) is a private Catholic Gymnasium and Realgymnasium located in Linz, Austria. Its roots are in a Jesuit seminary on the school's grounds in 1837, and the enlargement of this seminary as St. Aloysius Jesuit College in 1853. In 1912 the seminary took its present name, and in 1992 it became a day school open to the general populace.

== History ==
Archduke Maximilian of the House of Habsburg-Este, Grand Master of the Teutonic Order, donated Maximilian's Church (Maximilianskirchlein) and the Freinberg tower, near Linz, Austria, to the Jesuits of the Austrian province in 1837. This was the first residence of Austrian Jesuits after their readmission into Austria after the suppression..

In 1851 it became a minor seminary for those contemplating a religious vocation. When in 1853 the seminary outgrew the tower, Maximilian built a large boarding school, St. Aloysius Jesuit College, next to the Freinberg tower. This Jesuit seminary closed in 1897 with the founding of the Petrinum as a diocesan seminary, and reopened again in 1912 as the Collegium Aloysianum, a minor seminary for those destined for missionary work. During the First World War the building was shared with a military hospital. In 1938 Aloysianum was closed as the Nazi Wehrmacht used the building and grounds. After the War it was used as a refugee camp, and then returned to the Jesuits in 1946. In 1950 it opened again as a high school. After many changes in structure, in 1992 it became a private Catholic day school

== See also ==
- List of Jesuit schools
- Catholic Church in Austria
