= Elixhausen =

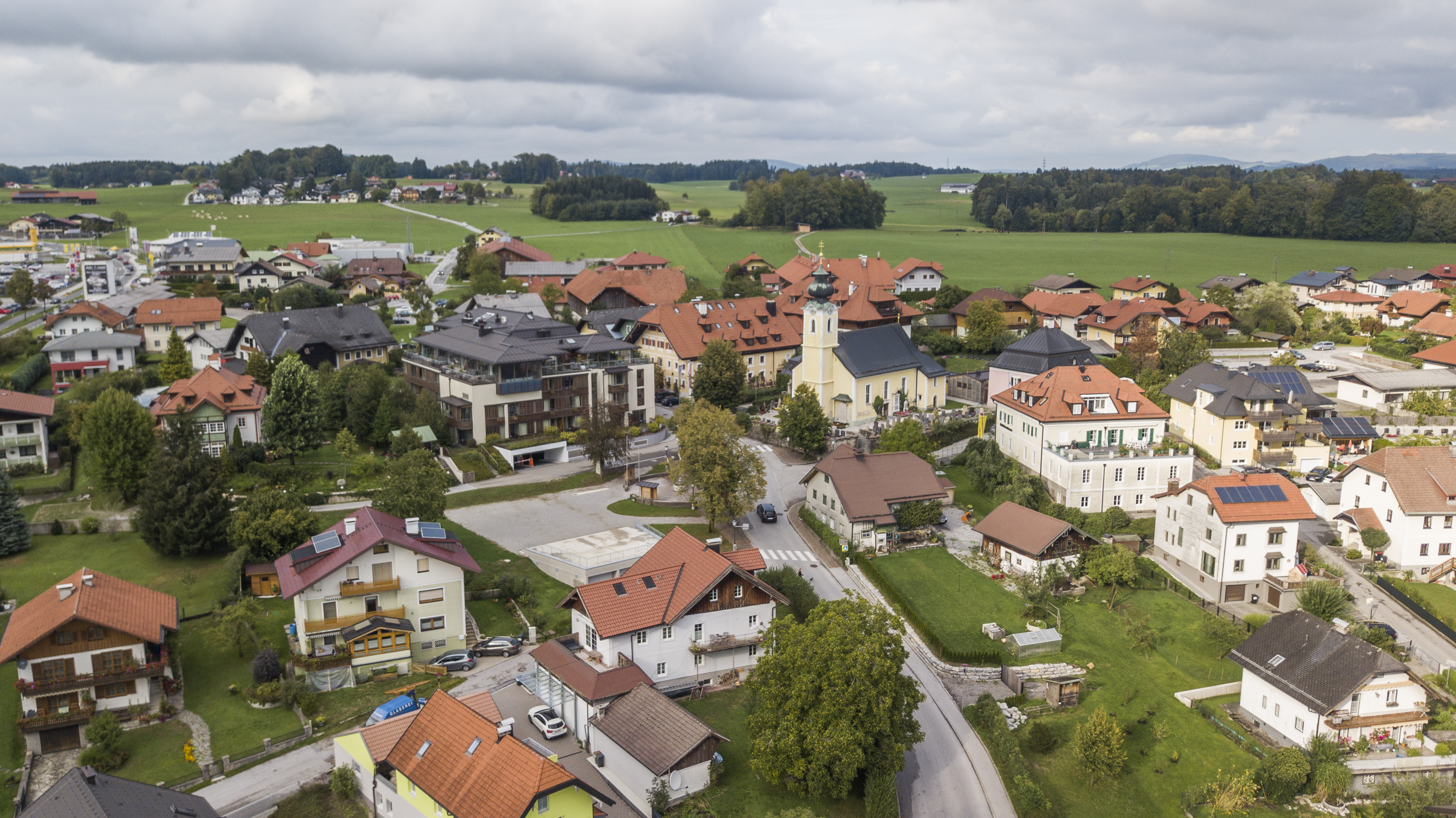
- Aerial view of Elixhausen

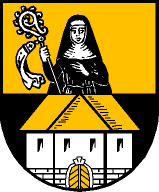
- Coat of arms

- Location within Austria
- Coordinates: 47°52′00″N 13°04′00″E
- Country: Austria
- State: Salzburg
- District: Salzburg-Umgebung

Government
  - Mayor: Michael Prantner (ÖVP)

Area
  - Total: 8.36 km^{2} (3.23 sq mi)
- Elevation: 545 m (1,788 ft)

Population (2018-01-01)
  - Total: 2,963
  - Density: 354/km^{2} (918/sq mi)
- Time zone: UTC+1 (CET)
  - Summer (DST): UTC+2 (CEST)
- Postal code: 5161
- Area code: 0662
- Vehicle registration: SL
- Website: www.elixhausen.at

Elixhausen is a municipality in the district of Salzburg-Umgebung in the state of Salzburg in Austria.

== Geography ==
Elixhausen lies in the Flachgau about 10 km northeast of the city of Salzburg. Neighboring municipalities are Bergheim, Anthering, Seekirchen, and Hallwang. The municipality is divided into five subdivisions: Ursprung, Moosham (also Moßham), Sachsenheim, Auberg, and Katzmoos.

The municipality stands next to the Ursprunger moor, which is +5,000 years old.

== Education ==
HLFS Ursprung, an agricultural school is located in the municipality.

== Economy ==
The inn Elixhauser Wirt in Elixhauser (formerly Gmachl) is the country's oldest family business, established since 1334.

According to the Zentrums für Verwaltungsforschung (Center for Administrative Research), from 2020 to 2022, Elixhausen ranked first as the Austrian municipality with the best credit rating.

== Culture ==
A branch of the Red Cross Museum Salzburg is located in Elixhausen, where 12 historic ambulances are on display.

== People ==
- Karoline Edtstadler, Austrian politician
