= Synnøve des Bouvrie =

Norwegian philologist

Synnøve des Bouvrie (born 16 November 1944) is a Norwegian philologist.

She was born in Naarden, Netherlands as a twin. She took her classical languages education at Leiden University. In her academic career she served as managing director of the Norwegian Institute at Athens and professor of antique culture and literature at the University of Tromsø. She is a fellow of the Center for Hellenic Studies, Harvard and the Norwegian Academy of Science and Letters.
