= Pontifical Academy for Latin =

Catholic institution

- Latin: Pontificia Academia Latinitatis
- Type: Pontifical academy
- Established: 2012
- President: Professor Mario De Nonno
- Location: Via della Conciliazione 5, Vatican City
- Website: vatican.va/pal

The Pontifical Academy for Latin (Latin: Pontificia Academia Latinitatis) is an organization established in 2012 to promote appreciation for the Latin language and culture. The Academy replaced the Latinitas Foundation, which Pope Paul VI erected in 1976, and is linked to the Dicastery for Culture and Education on which it depends. Its headquarters is located in Vatican City.

== Creation ==
The Pontifical Academy for Latin was established on 10 November 2012, by Pope Benedict XVI through the motu proprio Latina Lingua. Its mission is to preserve and promote various forms of modern and ancient Latin, with a focus on, but by no means limited to, ecclesiastical Latin (Church Latin) as used in liturgies and Masses from the 2002 Roman Missal (including the Mass of Popes Paul VI and John Paul II, typically said in the vernacular or local language) and the 1962 Roman Missal, the last pre-Vatican II edition, which includes the Mass of Pope John XXIII.

Benedict noted that knowledge of Latin was becoming ever more superficial even among those studying for the priesthood, and he hoped to support a deeper appreciation of Latin and the culture attached to it both within the Church and in the broader intellectual context. He envisioned the Academy at the center of a network of academic institutions to enhance appreciation for the heritage provided by Latin civilization. He called for educational methodologies appropriate to the present time.

With Pope Francis' reorganization of the Roman Curia of 5 June 2022 as provided for in the apostolic constitution Praedicate evangelium, the new Dicastery for Culture and Education became responsible for coordinating the work of the academy with its own work and that of a number of other bodies.

The publication of its semi-annual journal Latinitas ended with the 2013 volume.

== Leadership ==
On 10 November 2012, Professor Ivano Dionigi and Father Giuseppe Caruso were named the Academy's first president and secretary, respectively. On 20 December 2017, Pope Francis confirmed Dionigi to another five-year term.

== Organisation ==
The Pontifical Academy for Latin consists of a president, a secretary, the Academic Council and no more than fifty members who are also known as academicians. The president of the Academy is appointed by the pope to a renewable five-year term. The president represents the Academy legally before any judicial or administrative authority, chairs the Academic Council and the assembly of members, represents the Academy in meetings of the Coordinating Council of the Pontifical Academies, maintains the Academy's relationship with the Dicastery for Culture and Education, supervises the Academy's work, and takes care of its ordinary administration. In matters of extraordinary administration, he does so with the advice of the Academic Council and the Dicastery for Culture and Education.

The Academic Council consists of the president, the secretary, and five councilors elected by the Assembly of Academics for a five-year term that may be extended. The Council, chaired by the president, deliberates on the more important matters that concern the Academy. It approves the agenda for the Assembly of members to be held at least once a year. The Council is convoked by the president at least once a year and, in addition, whenever it is requested by at least three Councilors. The president, with the consent of the Council, may appoint an archivist and a treasurer.

Members are scholars and connoisseurs of the Latin language and Latin literature appointed by the Secretary of State of the Holy See who retire with the dignity of members emeriti at the age of 80. Members take part in the Assembly of the Academy and members emeriti may take part in the Assembly but are not entitled to vote. The president, after consulting the Council, may appoint correspondents.

== Members ==
- Felix Maria Arocena Solano
- Rémi Brague
- Giuseppe Caruso, OSA
- Paolo D'Alessandro
- Mario De Nonno
- Ivano Dionigi
- Mirella Ferrari
- Robert Gooding
- Philip Hardie
- William Klingshirn
- Peter Kruschwitz
- Michel Willy Libambu
- Carla Lo Cicero
- Ambrogio M. Piazzoni
- Ermanno Malaspina
- Antonio Manfredi
- Paolo Marpicati
- Marcos Martinho Dos Santos
- Paul Mattei
- Luigi Miraglia
- Marco Navoni
- Stefen Oakley
- Sergio Pagano
- Anna Pasquazi
- Bruna Pieri
- Mauro Pisini
- Emanuela Prinzivalli
- Antonio Salvi, O.F.M. CAP.
- Manlio Sodi, SDB
- Roberto Spataro, SDB

== See also ==
- Index of Vatican City-related articles
