= Latinitas Foundation =

Former language promotion organization of the Holy See

Coordinates: 41°54′15″N 12°27′09″E

- Formation: June 30, 1976
- Dissolved: November 10, 2012
- Location: Vatican City
- Website: latinitas at www.vatican.va

The Latinitas Foundation (Latin: Opus Fundatum Latinitas) was an organisation dedicated to furthering the education of Latin and the publication of articles in the language. It was established on 30 June 1976 by Pope Paul VI and was superseded by the Pontifical Academy for Latin (Pontificia Academia Latinitatis) which was established on 10 November 2012 by Pope Benedict XVI.
