= Carmen Sandi =

Spanish behavioral neuroscientist

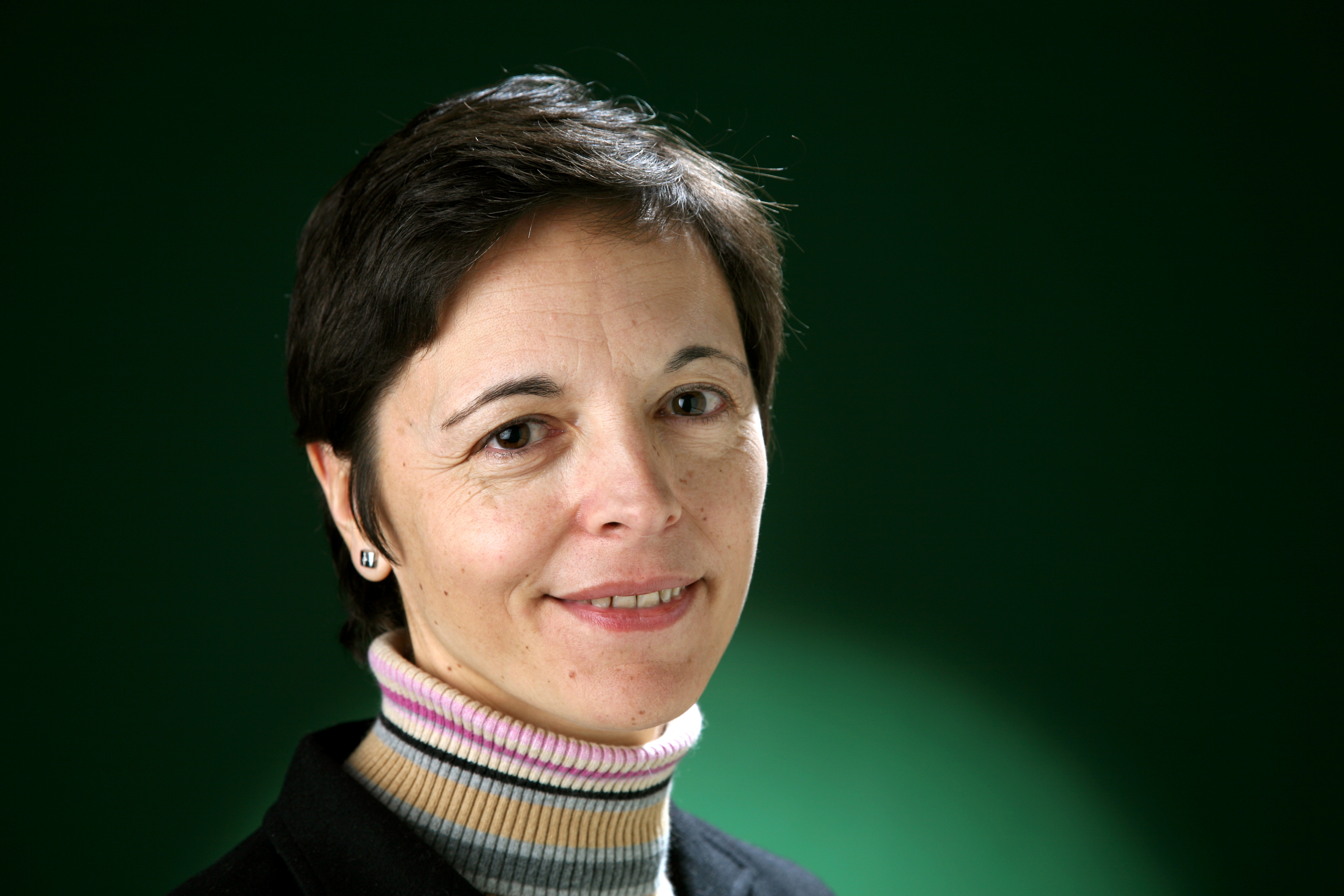
- Born: 1961 (age 64–65)
- Education: Cajal Institute, CSIC, Madrid
- Known for: Behavioural genetics
- Scientific career
- Fields: Neuroscience
- Workplaces: University of Bordeaux; University of Bern; EPFL
- Website: https://lgc.epfl.ch/

Carmen Sandi (born 1961) is a Spanish and Swiss behavioral neuroscientist. She is a professor of neuroscience and director of the Laboratory of Behavioral Genetics at the Brain Mind Institute (École Polytechnique Fédérale de Lausanne).

== Early life and education ==
Born and raised in Torrelavega (Cantabria), Spain, Sandi moved to Salamanca to obtain her BS and MS from the University of Salamanca in 1984 and further to Madrid for her PhD at the Cajal Institute (Spanish National Research Council) and the Autonomous University of Madrid in 1988. She continued her postdoctoral research at INSERM, Bordeaux, France (1989–90) and Open University, UK (1991–96).

== Research and career ==
Sandi worked as a Research Associate at her alma mater (Cajal Institute; 1993–95), before joining faculty as an Associate Professor Tenured at UNED University, Madrid. She spent nearly a decade there (1996-2003) working on the relationship between fear conditioning and memory. After taking a year long sabbatical (2002–03) as a visiting professor at the University of Bern, Switzerland, she joined EPFL in Switzerland as a tenure track professor, and has been working there since. At the EPFL, Sandi is currently Full Professor and Director of the Laboratory of Behavioral Genetics. She was the director of the Brain Mind Institute from 2012–2019. She is founder and co-President of the Swiss Stress Network.

Currently, Sandi's lab investigates stress, the brain, and behaviour - namely the neurobiological mechanisms of how stress alters the brain in the context of cognition and social behaviours. Her interests have expanded beyond social dominance across multiple subjects and into coping mechanisms in depressive situations at the individual level. She has published over 190 papers, resulting in more than 12600 citations and an h-index of 64.

From 2010-2011 Sandi was president of the European Brain and Behaviour Society and she became president of the Federation of European Neuroscience Societies for the 2018–2020 term. In the same year, she also became co-director of the Swiss research network (National Centre of Competence in Research) on psychiatric disorders, "Synapsy". She also serves on the editorial boards of Current Opinion in Behavioral Sciences, Journal of Psychiatric Research, Neurobiology of Stress, Neuroscience & Biobehavioral Reviews, eNeuro, Biological Psychiatry and Psychoneuroendocrinology.

== Publications ==
1. Sandi, C., Pinelo-Nava, M.T. Stress and Memory: Behavioral Effects and Neurobiological Mechanisms. Neural Plasticity. 2007; Article ID: 78970, Stress and Memory: Behavioral Effects and Neurobiological Mechanisms.
2. Sandi, C., Haller, J. Stress and the social brain: behavioural effects and neurobiological mechanisms. Nat Rev Neurosci 16, 290–304 (2015). https://doi.org/10.1038/nrn3918
3. Sandi, C., Loscertales, M., Guaza, C. Experience-dependent facilitating effect of corticosterone on spatial memory formation in the water maze. European Journal of Neuroscience. 1997; 9(4): 637–642, Experience-dependent Facilitating Effect of Corticosterone on Spatial Memory Formation in the Water Maze
4. Filiou, M.D., Sandi, C. Anxiety and Brain Mitochondria: A Bidirectional Crosstalk. Trends in Neurosciences. 2019; 42(9): 573–588, Anxiety and Brain Mitochondria: A Bidirectional Crosstalk
5. Hollis, F., Kooij, M.A., Zanoletti, O., et al. Mitochondrial Function in the Brain Links Anxiety With Social Subordination. Proceedings of the National Academy of Sciences of the United States of America. 2015; 112(50): 15486–15491, Mitochondrial function in the brain links anxiety with social subordination
6. Bacq, A., Astori, S., Gebara, E., et al. Amygdala GluN2B-NMDAR Dysfunction Is Critical in Abnormal Aggression of Neurodevelopmental Origin Induced by St8sia2 Deficiency. Molecular Psychiatry. 2018; (Published ahead of print), doi:10.1038/s41380-018-0132-3

== Awards and honors ==
- ECNP Neurophsychoparmacology Award (2025)
- Brain Behavior Research Foundation (BBRF) Distinguished Investigator Award (2024)
- Ron de Kloet Award (2018)
- Visiting Professor, Rockefeller University, New York (2016)
- Valkhof Chair, Radboud University, Nijmegen, Netherlands (2015)
- Distinguished Visiting Scientist Fellow, Hungarian Academy of Sciences (2015)
- Society for Social Neuroscience (SS4N), Inaugural Fellow (2015)
- Behavioral Brain Research Prize (2014)
- Faculty of 1000, Section Cognitive Neuroscience, Faculty member (2012)
- Latsis Foundation award EPFL-Latsis Symposium (2009)
- Visiting Professor, The Chinese Academy of Sciences, Beijing, China (1999)
- Serono Research Prize (1984)
