= Shaun Gallagher =

American philosopher

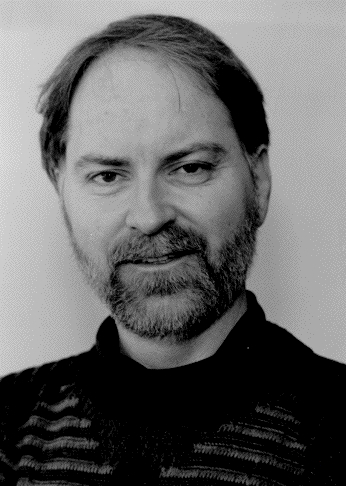
- Born: 1948 (age 77–78); Philadelphia, Pennsylvania, U.S.

Education
- Education: St. Columban's College (BA); Villanova University (MA, philosophy); Bryn Mawr College (PhD); University at Buffalo (MA, economics)
- Thesis: Lived Body and Time: A Phenomenologically Based Account of Human Nature (1980)
- Doctoral advisors: José Ferrater Mora; George L. Kline

Philosophical work
- Era: Contemporary philosophy
- Region: Western philosophy
- School: Continental philosophy Phenomenology; Hermeneutics; Enactivism
- Institutions: Gwynedd-Mercy College; Canisius College; University of Central Florida; University of Hertfordshire; University of Memphis; University of Wollongong
- Main interests: Philosophy of mind, embodied cognition, social cognition, agency, philosophy of psychiatry
- Notable ideas: Coining the term "4E cognition"; Clarification of the distinction between body image and body schema; Distinction between sense of ownership and sense of agency; Pattern theory of self; Socially extended mind (cognitive institutions)

Shaun Gallagher (born 1948) is an American philosopher known for his work on embodied cognition, social cognition, agency and the philosophy of psychopathology.

Since 2011, he has held the Lillian and Morrie Moss Chair of Excellence in Philosophy at the University of Memphis and was awarded the Anneliese Maier Research Award by the Humboldt Foundation (2012–2018). Since 2014, he has been a Professorial Fellow at the University of Wollongong in Australia. He has held visiting positions at: Sapienza University of Rome, Roma Tre University, Keble College, Oxford; Humboldt University, Berlin; Ruhr Universität, Bochum; Husserl Archives, ENS (Paris); École Normale Supérieure, Lyon; University of Copenhagen; and the Cognition and Brain Sciences Unit, Cambridge University. He is also known for his philosophical discussion on the effects of solitary confinement.

== Career ==
Gallagher received his PhD in philosophy from Bryn Mawr College where he studied with George Kline and José Ferrater-Mora. He also studied philosophy at Villanova University and Leuven, and economics at the State University of New York–Buffalo. In 2021 he received an Honorary Doctorate (D.Phil honoris causa) from the University of Copenhagen.

Gallagher is the author of several books, including The Self and its Disorders (Oxford, 2024), Embodied and Enactive Approaches to Cognition (Cambridge 2023) Action and Interaction (Oxford 2020), Enactivist Interventions: Rethinking the Mind (Oxford 2017), How the Body Shapes the Mind (Oxford 2005), Phenomenology (Palgrave 2012; 2nd ed. 2022), Hermeneutics and Education (SUNY 1992), The Inordinance of Time (Northwestern 1998), Brainstorming (Acad Imprint 2008), The Phenomenological Mind (Routledge 2008; 2nd edition, 2012, 3rd edition 2021; with Dan Zahavi), and (with several co-authors) The Neurophenomenology of Awe and Wonder (2015). He is also editor of The Oxford Handbook of the Self (2011), co-editor of The Oxford Handbook of 4E-Cognition (2018), and editor or co-editor of several other volumes. He is a founding editor and served as co-editor-in-chief (2001-2025) of the journal Phenomenology and the Cognitive Sciences.

== Bibliography ==
- The Self and its Disorders. (Oxford: Oxford University Press, 2024)
- Embodied and Enactive Approaches to Cognition. (Cambridge: Cambridge University Press, 2023)
- Performance/Art: The Venetian Lectures (Milan: Mimesis International Edizioni, 2021)
- Action and Interaction (Oxford: Oxford University Press, 2020)
- Oxford Handbook of 4E-Cognition (ed. with A. Newen, L. DeBruin (Oxford: Oxford University Press, 2018)
- Enactivist Interventions: Rethinking the Mind (Oxford: Oxford University Press, 2017)
- Phenomenology (London: Palgrave Macmillan, 2012)
- The Oxford Handbook of the Self (ed) (Oxford University Press, 2011)
- Handbook of Phenomenology and Cognitive Science. Co-edited with D. Schmicking (Berlin: Springer, 2010)
- The Phenomenological Mind (Routledge; 2008). Second edition (2012); Third edition (2021), co-authored with Dan Zahavi
- Brainstorming: Views and Interviews on the Mind (Exeter, UK: Imprint Academic, 2008)
- Does Consciousness Cause Behavior? An Investigation of the Nature of Volition. Co-edited with W. Banks and S. Pockett (Cambridge, MA: MIT Press, 2006)
- How the Body Shapes the Mind (Oxford University Press; 2005)
- Ipseity and Alterity: Interdisciplinary Approaches to Intersubjectivity. Co-edited with S. Watson (Rouen: Publications de l'Université de Rouen, 2004)
- Models of the Self. Co-edited with J. Shear (Exeter, UK: Imprint Academic, 1999)
- The Inordinance of Time (Northwestern University Press, 1998)
- Hegel, History, and Interpretation. Editor (Albany: State University of New York Press, 1997)
- Merleau-Ponty, Hermeneutics, and Postmodernism, co-edited with T. Busch (Albany: State University of New York Press, 1992)
- Hermeneutics and Education (State University of New York Press, 1992)

== See also ==
- American philosophy
- List of American philosophers
