= Giacomo Rizzolatti =

Italian neurophysiologist (born 1937)

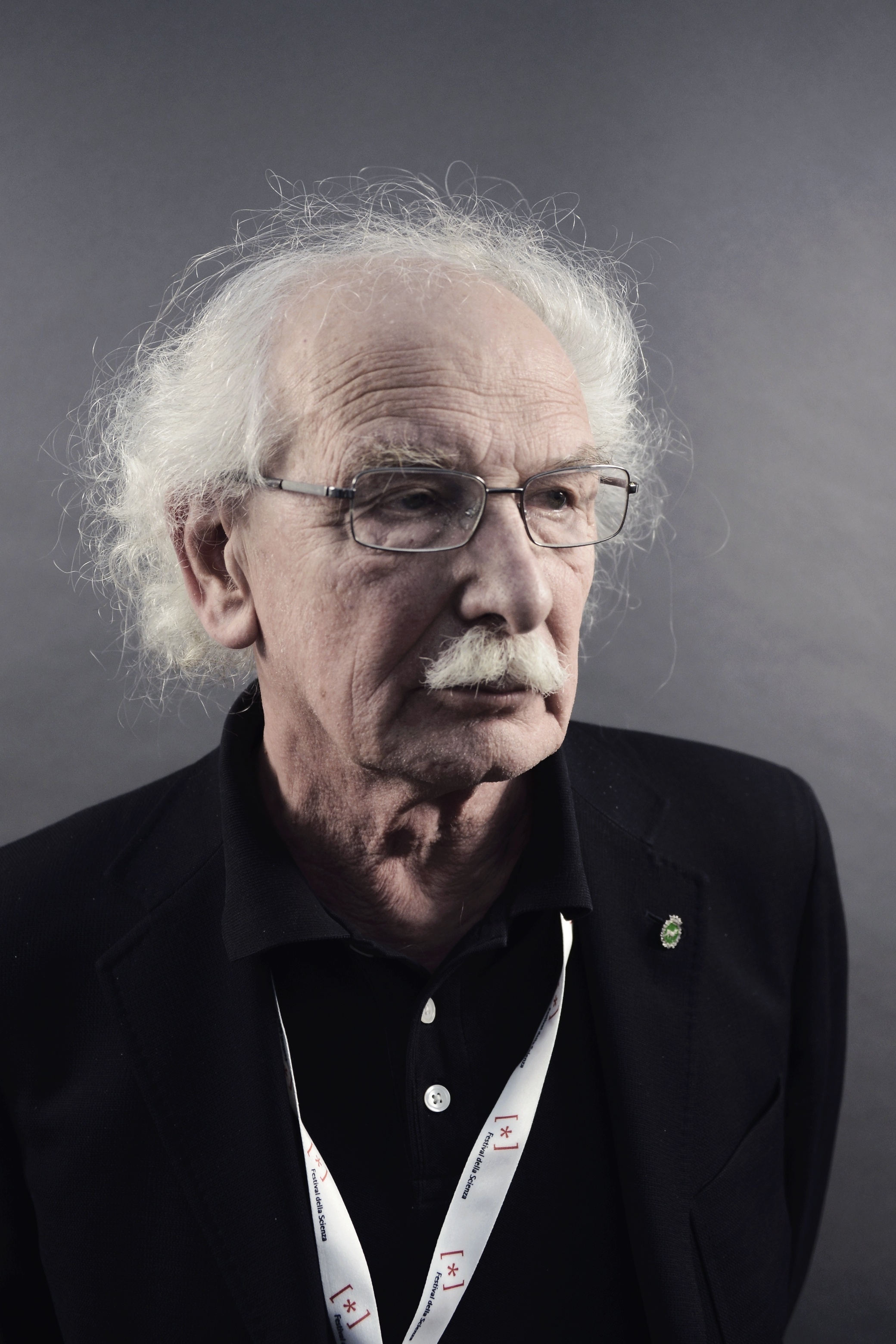
- Born: 28 April 1937 (age 89); Kyiv, Ukrainian SSR, Soviet Union
- Education: University of Padua
- Known for: Mirror neurons
- Awards: Golgi Prize for Physiology; George Miller Award; Feltrinelli Prize for Medicine (2000); Herlitzka Prize for Physiology; Brain Prize for Neurosciences
- Scientific career
- Fields: Neurophysiology
- Workplaces: University of Parma
- Academic advisors: Giuseppe Moruzzi

Giacomo Rizzolatti (born 28 April 1937) is an Italian neurophysiologist who works at the University of Parma. Born in Kyiv, UkSSR, he is the Senior Scientist of the research team that discovered mirror neurons in the frontal and parietal cortex of the macaque monkey, and has written many scientific articles on the topic. He also proposed the premotor theory of attention. He is a past president of the European Brain and Behaviour Society. Rizzolatti was the 2007 co-recipient, with Leonardo Fogassi and Vittorio Gallese, for the University of Louisville Grawemeyer Award for Psychology. He is an elected member of the Academia Europaea, National Academy of Sciences, and Royal Society.

== Biography ==
In the same year he was born, he was expelled from the Soviet Union with his parents and other members of the Rizzolatti family, as a foreigner. A law introduced during the Fascist era requires that repatriation take place in Friuli, in Clauzetto, as the town of origin of Giacomo's great-grandfather, who emigrated to Kiev in the late 19th century. He then graduated from the Liceo Classico Jacopo Stellini high school in Udine and in 1961 he graduated in Medicine and surgery from the University of Padua, where he also obtained a specialization in Neurology in 1964.

After three years at the Institute of Physiology at the University of Pisa, directed by Giuseppe Moruzzi (and of whom he was a student), in 1967 he became assistant professor and later full professor of Human Physiology at the University of Parma; since 2002, he has been director of the Academic department of Neuroscience at the same university. Since 2012, he has been teaching Neurophysiological Foundations of Cognitive Functions at the Faculty of Philosophy of the Vita-Salute San Raffaele University in Milan.

He spent periods studying and conducting research at the Department of Psychology at McMaster University and, as a visiting professor, at the Department of Anatomy at the University of Pennsylvania.

From 1985 to 1986, he was president of the European Brain Behavior Society.

He is the coordinator of the group of scientists who, in 1992, in the field of Evolutionary psychology, discovered the existence of Mirror neuron, motor cells in the brain that are activated both during the execution of purposeful movements and when observing similar movements performed by other individuals, a discovery that, among other things, identified the first physiological basis of empathy. In 1995, they discovered motor resonance in humans.

One of the world's leading neuroscientists, he is a member of the Academia Europaea, the Accademia Nazionale dei Lincei, the American Academy of Arts and Sciences, and the French Academy of Sciences of the Institut de France. He is an honorary member of the Italian Society for Neuroscience, of which he was president. He was elected a Foreign Member of the Royal Society in 2021. He has been awarded the 41st (2025) International Prize for Biology by the Japan Society for the Promotion of Science (JSPS).

== Awards ==
- 2011 Prince of Asturias Award for Technical and Scientific Research.

These are listed on the right side of the Wikipedia page:

- Golgi Prize for Physiology
- George Miller Award
- Feltrinelli Prize for Medicine
- Herlitzka Prize for Physiology

== Selected works ==
- Nelissen, Koen; Luppino, Giuseppe; Vanduffel, Wim; Rizzolatti, Giacomo; Orban, Guy A. (2005). "Observing Others: Multiple Action Representation in the Frontal Lobe". Science. 310 (5746): 332–336. Bibcode:2005Sci...310..332N. doi:10.1126/science.1115593. PMID 16224029. S2CID 18812275.
- Rizzolatti, Giacomo; Sinigaglia, Corrado (2008). Mirrors In The Brain: How Our Minds Share Actions and Emotions. New York: Oxford University Press. ISBN 978-0-19-921798-4.

== Bibliography ==
- Biography at University of Parma
