= Agency (sociology) =

Capacity of individuals to make free choices

In social science, agency is the capacity of individuals to have the power and resources to fulfill their potential. Social structure consists of those factors of influence (such as social class, religion, gender, ethnicity, ability, customs, etc.) that determine or limit agents and their decisions. The influences from structure and agency are debated—it is unclear to what extent a person's actions are constrained by social systems.

One's agency is one's independent capability or ability to act on one's will. This ability is affected by the cognitive belief structure which one has formed through one's experiences, and the perceptions held by the society and the individual, of the structures and circumstances of the environment one is in and the position one is born into. Disagreement on the extent of one's agency often causes conflict between parties, e.g. parents and children.

== History ==
The overall concept of agency has existed since the Enlightenment where there was debate over whether human freedom was expressed through instrumental rationality or moral and norm-based action. John Locke argued in favor of freedom being based on self-interest. His rejection of the binding of tradition and the concept of the social contract led to the conception of agency as the capacity of human beings to shape the circumstances in which they live. Jean-Jacques Rousseau explored an alternative conception of this freedom by framing it as a moral will. There was a bifurcation between the rational-utilitarian and non-rational-normative dimensions of action that Immanuel Kant addressed. Kant saw freedom as normative grounded individual will, governed by the categorical imperative. These ideas were the point of departure for concerns regarding non-rational, norm-oriented action in classical sociological theory contrasting with the views on the rational instrumental action.

These definitions of agency remained mostly unquestioned until the nineteenth century, when philosophers began arguing that the choices humans make are dictated by forces beyond their control. For example, Karl Marx argued that in modern society, people were controlled by the ideologies of the bourgeoisie, Friedrich Nietzsche argued that man made choices based on his own selfish desires, or the "will to power" and, famously, Paul Ricœur added Freud – as a third member of the "school of suspicion" – who accounted for the unconscious determinants of human behavior. Ludwig Wittgenstein's talk of rule-following and private language arguments in his Philosophical Investigations has also made its way into the discussion of agency, in the work of Charles Taylor for example.

== Definitions and processes ==
Agency has also been defined in the American Journal of Sociology as a temporally embedded process that encompasses three different constitutive elements: iteration, projectivity and practical evaluation. Each of these elements is a component of agency as a whole. They are used to study different aspects of agency independently to make conclusions about the bigger concept. The iteration element of agency refers to the selective reactivation of past patterns of thought and action. In this way, actors have routine actions in response to typical situations that help them sustain identities, interactions and institutions over time. The projective element encompasses the process of imagining possible future trajectories of action connected to the actor's hopes, fears, and desires for the future. The last element, the practical-evaluative element, entails the capacity of people to make practical and normative judgements amongst alternative possible actions in response to a context, a demand or a presently evolving situation.

=== Hewson's classification ===
Martin Hewson, Associate at the York Centre for International and Security Studies, York University, describes three types of agency: individual, proxy, and collective. Individual agency is when a person acts on their own behalf, whereas proxy agency is when an individual acts on behalf of someone else (such as an employer). Collective agency occurs when people act together, such as a social movement. Hewson also identifies three properties of human beings that give rise to agency: intentionality, power, and rationality. Human beings act with intention and are goal oriented. They also have differing amounts of abilities and resources resulting in some having greater agency (power) than others. Finally, human beings use their intellect to guide their actions and predict the consequences of their actions.

=== In conversation ===
In his work on conversational agency, David R. Gibson defines agency as action that furthers an actor's idiosyncratic objectives in the face of localized constraints that also have the potential of suppressing the very same action. Constraints such as who is speaking, how is participation shifted among participants, and topical and relevance constraints can impact the possibility of expressing agency. Seizing the moment, when the "looseness" of such constraints allows, enables users to express what Gibson calls "colloquial agency".

== Feelings ==
Social psychologist Daniel Wegner discusses how an "illusion of control" may cause people to take credit for events that they did not cause. These false judgments of agency occur especially under stress, or when the results of the event were ones that the individual desired (also see self-serving biases). Janet Metcalfe and her colleagues have identified other possible heuristics, or rules of thumb that people use to make judgments of agency. These include a "forward model" in which the mind actually compares two signals to judge agency: the feedback from a movement, but also an "efferent copy" – a mental prediction of what that movement feedback should feel like. Top down processing (understanding of a situation, and other possible explanations) can also influence judgments of agency. Furthermore, the relative importance of one heuristic over another seems to change with age.

From an evolutionary perspective, the illusion of agency would be beneficial in allowing social animals to ultimately predict the actions of others. If one considers themself a conscious agent, then the quality of agency would naturally be intuited upon others. As it is possible to deduce another's intentions, the assumption of agency allows one to extrapolate from those intentions what actions someone else is likely to perform.

Under other conditions, cooperation between two subjects with a mutual feeling of control is what James M. Dow, Associate Professor of Philosophy at Hendrix College, defines as "joint agency." According to various studies on optimistic views of cooperation, "the awareness of doing things together jointly suggest that the experience of subjects engaging in cooperation involves a positive here and now experience of the activity being under joint control." Shared agency increases the amount of control between those cooperating in any given situation, which, in return, could have negative effects on individuals that the partners in control associate with. If joint agency is held by two people that are already in a position of power, the partners' heightened feeling of agency directly affects those who are inferior to them. The inferiors' sense of agency will most likely decrease upon the superiors' joint control because of intimidation and solitude factors. Although working together towards a common goal tends to cause an increased feeling of agency, the inflation of control could have many unforeseen consequences.

== Children ==
Children's sense of agency is often not taken into account because of the common belief that they are not capable of making their own rational decisions without adult guidance.

== See also ==
- Action theory
- Agency (philosophy)
- Agency (psychology)
- Community development
- Dignity of risk
- Diversity, equity and inclusion
- Diversity (politics)
- Diversity training
- Empowerment
- Freedom of speech
- Gender empowerment
- Negative capability
- Paracosm
- Social action
- Social relation
- Structure and agency
- Theory of structuration
- Women empowerment
