= Sense of agency =

Sense of controlling one's own actions

The sense of agency (SoA), or sense of control, is the subjective awareness of initiating, executing, and controlling one's own volitional actions in the world. It is the pre-reflective awareness or implicit sense that it is I who is executing bodily movement(s) or thinking thoughts. In non-pathological experience, the SoA is tightly integrated with one's "sense of ownership" (SoO), which is the pre-reflective awareness or implicit sense that one is the owner of an action, movement or thought. If someone else were to move your arm (while you remained passive) you would certainly have sensed that it were your arm that moved and thus a sense of ownership (SoO) for that movement. However, you would not have felt that you were the author of the movement; you would not have a sense of agency (SoA).

Normally SoA and SoO are tightly integrated, such that while typing one has an enduring, embodied, and tacit sense that "my own fingers are doing the moving" (SoO) and that "the typing movements are controlled (or volitionally directed) by me" (SoA). In patients with certain forms of pathological experience (e.g., schizophrenia) the integration of SoA and SoO may become disrupted in some manner. In this case, movements may be executed or thoughts made manifest, for which the patient with schizophrenia has a sense of ownership, but not a sense of agency.

Regarding SoA for both motor movements and thoughts, further distinctions may be found in both first-order (immediate, pre-reflective) experience and higher-order (reflective or introspective) consciousness. For example, while typing one has a sense of control and thus SoA for the ongoing action of typing; this is an example of SoA in first-order experience which is immediate and prior to any explicit intellectual reflection upon the typing actions themselves. In this case, the individual is not focusing on the typing movements per se but rather, intimately involved with the task at hand. If one is subsequently asked if they just performed the action of typing, they can -correctly- attribute agency to themselves. This is an example of a higher-order, reflective, conscious "attribution" of agency, which is a derivative notion stemming from the immediate, pre-reflective "sense" of agency.

== Definition ==
The concept of agency implies an active organism, one who desires, makes plans, and carries out actions. The sense of agency plays a pivotal role in cognitive development, including the first stage of self-awareness (or pre-theoretical experience of one's own mentality), which scaffolds theory of mind capacities. Indeed, the ability to recognize oneself as the agent of a behavior is the way the self builds as an entity independent from the external world. The sense of agency and its scientific study has important implications in social cognition, moral reasoning, and psychopathology. The conceptual distinction between SoA and SoO was defined by philosopher and phenomenologist Shaun Gallagher. Using a different terminology, essentially the same distinction has been made by John Campbell, and Lynn Stephens and George Graham.

== Psychological measures ==
Sense of agency is difficult to measure because individuals are often not aware of their sense of agency while performing tasks. An implicit measure of agency relies on intentional binding an effect where the perceived time between related events is decreased. Other implicit measures rely on sensory attenuation to voluntary acts, where one perceives sensations related to voluntary acts less. Explicit measures can depend upon self-report or perceived responsibility for an outcome.

== Neuroscience ==
A number of experiments in healthy individuals has been undertaken in order to determine the functional anatomy of the sense of agency. These experiments have consistently documented the role of the posterior parietal cortex as a critical link within the simulation network for self-recognition. Primary sources have reported that activation of the right inferior parietal lobe/temporoparietal junction correlates with the subjective sense of ownership in action execution, and that posterior parietal lesions, especially on the right side, impair the ability of recognizing one's own body parts and self-attributing one's own movements.

Accumulating evidence from functional neuroimaging studies, as well as lesion studies in neurological patients indicates that the right inferior parietal cortex, at the junction with the posterior temporal cortex (TPJ, temporoparietal junction), plays a critical role in the distinction between self-produced actions and actions perceived in others. Lesions of this region can produce a variety of disorders associated with body knowledge and self-awareness such as anosognosia, asomatognosia, or somatoparaphrenia. A primary source has reported that electrical stimulation of the TPJ can elicit out-of-body experiences (i.e., the experience of dissociation of self from the body).

The investigation of the neural correlates of reciprocal imitation is extremely important because it provides an ecological paradigm (a situation close to everyday life) to address the issue of the sense of agency. There is evidence that reciprocal imitation plays a constitutive role in the early development of an implicit sense of self as a social agent.

A primary source has reported a functional neuroimaging experiment, where participants were scanned while they imitated an experimenter performing constructions with small objects and while the experimenter, while performing such a manipulation, imitated the participants. Across both conditions, the participants' sense of ownership (the sense that it is I who am experiencing the movement or thought) as well as the visual and somatosensory inputs were similar or coincided. What differed between imitating and being imitated was the agent who initiated the action. The primary source reports that several key regions were involved in the two conditions of reciprocal imitation compared to a control condition (in which subjects acted differently from the experimenter), namely in the superior temporal sulcus, the temporoparietal cortex (TPJ), and the medial prefrontal cortex.

Another approach to understanding the neuroscientific underpinnings of the sense of agency is to examine clinical conditions in which purposeful limb movement occurs without an associated sense of agency. The most clear clinical demonstration of this situation is alien hand syndrome. In this condition, associated with specific forms of brain damage, the affected individual loses the sense of agency without losing a sense of ownership of the affected body part.

== Agency and psychopathology ==
Investigation of the sense of agency is important to explain positive symptoms of schizophrenia, like thought insertion and delusions of control. Research has shown that people diagnosed with schizophrenia have issues with processing agency. Marc Jeannerod proposed that the process of self-recognition operates covertly and effortlessly. It depends upon a set of mechanisms involving the processing of specific neural signals, from sensory as well as from central origin.

== See also ==
- Common coding theory
- Empathic concern
- Locus of control – whether people believe that their choices, environmental factors, fate, and/or random chance is controlling their lives
- Mirror neurons
- Morality
- Motor cognition
- Neuroscience of free will
- Self-agency
- Self-efficacy
