= Marc Jeannerod =

Neurologist and neurophysiologist

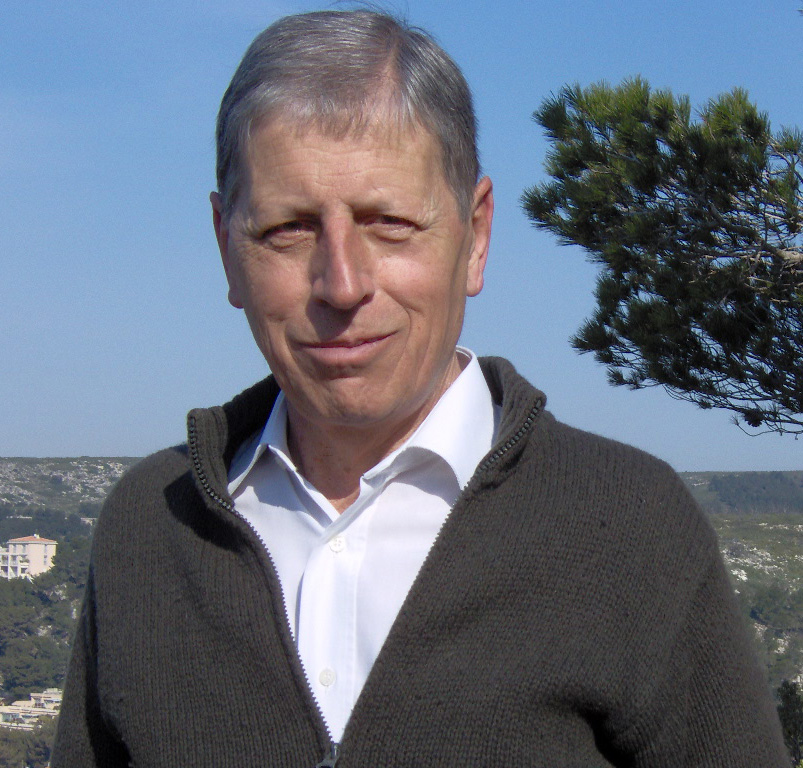
- Born: 15 December 1935; Lyon, France
- Died: 1 July 2011 (aged 75); Lyon, France
- Education: Claude Bernard University Lyon 1
- Known for: Neurophysiology and Philosophy of Action
- Awards: Member of the Academy of Sciences, Légion d'honneur
- Scientific career
- Fields: Neurophysiology
- Workplaces: Claude Bernard University Lyon 1 (professor)
- Doctoral advisor: Michel Jouvet
- Doctoral students: Jean Decety

Marc Jeannerod (15 December 1935 – 1 July 2011) was a neurologist, a neurophysiologist and an internationally recognized expert in cognitive neuroscience and experimental psychology. His studied the cognitive and neurophysiological mechanisms underpinning motor control, motor cognition, the sense of agency, and more recently language and social cognition. Jeannerod's work bridges with elegance and rigor various levels of analysis, ranging from neuroscience to philosophy of mind, with clear implications for the understanding of a number of psychiatric and neurological disorders, especially schizophrenia.

== Background ==
Marc Jeannerod studied Medicine at Claude Bernard University Lyon 1, France, and specialized in Neurology. He was awarded his MD degree in 1965. He got his research training in experimental medicine, studying the neurobiology of sleep under the supervision of Michel Jouvet, one of the discoverers of REM sleep. After his medical degree, Jeannerod became a research assistant in the Department of Anatomy at the University of California at Los Angeles, and then at the Massachusetts Institute of Technology with Hans-Lucas Teuber in the Department of Psychology. He subsequently became a professor of physiology at the University Claude Bernard Medical School in Lyon and headed the unit Vision and Motricity of the National Institute of Health and the Medical Research (INSERM) until 1997. He then founded and headed the Institute for Cognitive Sciences of the National Center for Scientific Research (CNRS) until 2003.

Jeannerod was a member of the French Academy of Sciences. He was appointed Knight of the Légion d'honneur in July 2008. He left behind a wife and four children upon his death.

== Editorial duties ==
Jeannerod was the chief editor of Neuropsychologia for ten years. He served on the editorial boards of several scientific journals, including NeuroImage, European Journal of Neuroscience, European Journal of Physiology, NeuroReport, Physiological Reviews, Journal of Motor Behavior, Perception, Cognition, Behavioural Brain Research, and Experimental Brain Research. He had been the president of the European Brain and Behaviour Society and was at the time of his death the president elect of the European Society for Philosophy and Psychology.

== Academic achievements ==
Marc Jeannerod's early work in neurophysiology and clinical neuropsychology has significantly contributed to new concepts that have impacted on the field of cognitive motor control and motor cognition, including motor imagery, and have led to new vistas for the understanding of higher-order motor disorders. Specifically, he has conducted a number of empirical investigations of clinical disorders including those of bimanual coordination, apraxia and sensorimotor transformation deficits, motor neglect, anarchic hand syndrome, and imitation.

More recently, studies conducted in Jeannerod's INSERM laboratory and CNRS Institute for Cognitive Science (French: institut des sciences cognitives) led him to advance an original account of the simulation theory in the context of motor cognition and motor imagery. This theory states that an action involves a covert stage, corresponding to its pragmatic representation, which includes its goal, the means to achieve it, and its consequences. Further, such pragmatic representation may be activated under a variety of conditions in relation to action, either self-intended or perceived from other individuals. Even though this process may have a conscious counterpart (one can consciously generate a mental image), most of its generation occurs at the covert level. One persuasive source of evidence in support of this view comes from studies using transcranial magnetic stimulation that show that the mere observation of grasping movements results in the specific modulation of motor-evoked potentials.

== Books ==
- Jeannerod, M. (2011). La Fabrique des idées. Odile Jacob Sciences. Paris.
- Jeannerod, M. (2006). Motor cognition: What actions tell the Self. Oxford University Press.
- Jacob, P. & Jeannerod, M. (2003). Ways of Seeing: The Scope and Limits of Visual Cognition. Oxford University Press.
- Jeannerod, M. (2002). Le Cerveau intime. Paris: Editions Odile Jacob.
- Jeannerod, M. (2002). La Nature de l'esprit. Paris: Editions Odile Jacob.
- Jeannerod, M. (1997). The Cognitive Neuroscience of Action. Wiley-Blackwell.
- Jeannerod, M., & Grafman, J. (1997). Handbook of Neuropsychology, Volume 11. Elsevier Science.
- Jeannerod, M. (1996). De la physiologie mentale: Histoire des relations entre la psychologie et la biologie. Paris: Editions Odile Jacob.
- Jeannerod, M. (1988). The Neural and Behavioural Organization of Goal-Directed Movements. Oxford University Press.
- Jeannerod, M. (1987). Neurophysiological & Neuropsychological Aspects of Spatial Neglect. Elsevier BV.
- Jeannerod, M. (1985). The Brain Machine: The Development of Neurophysiological Thought. Harvard University Press.

== Selected publications ==
- Frak, V.; Nazir, T.; Goyette, M.; Cohen, H.; Jeannerod, M. (2010). "Grip Force Is Part of the Semantic Representation of Manual Action Verbs". PLOS ONE. 5 (3) e9728. Bibcode:2010PLoSO...5.9728F. doi:10.1371/journal.pone.0009728. PMC 2838801. PMID 20300535.
- Jeannerod, M (2008). "The sense of agency and its disturbances in schizophrenia: a reappraisal". Experimental Brain Research. 192 (3): 527–532. doi:10.1007/s00221-008-1533-3. PMID 18709365. S2CID 1660642.
- Nazir, T.; Boulenger, V.; Roy, A.; Silber, B.; Jeannerod, M.; Paulignan, Y. (2008). "Language-induced motor perturbations during the execution of a reaching movement" (PDF). Quarterly Journal of Experimental Psychology. 61 (6): 933–943. doi:10.1080/17470210701625667. PMID 18470823. S2CID 8789100.
- Jeannerod, M (2008). "Putting oneself in the perspective of the other: A framework for self-other differentiation". Social Neuroscience. 3 (3–4): 356–367. doi:10.1080/17470910701563715. PMID 18979390. S2CID 205925001.
- Jeannerod, M.; Jacob, P. (2005). "The motor theory of social cognition: a critique". Trends in Cognitive Sciences. 9 (1): 21–25. CiteSeerX 10.1.1.583.8573. doi:10.1016/j.tics.2004.11.003. PMID 15639437. S2CID 218148887.
- Jeannerod, M (1994). "The representing brain: Neural correlates of motor intention and imagery". Behavioral and Brain Sciences. 17 (2): 187–245. doi:10.1017/s0140525x00034026. S2CID 40004903.
- Georgieff, N.; Jeannerod, M. (1998). "Beyond consciousness of external reality: a "who" system for consciousness of action and self-consciousness". Consciousness and Cognition. 7 (3): 465–77. doi:10.1006/ccog.1998.0367. PMID 9787056. S2CID 13890621.
- Decety, J.; Perani, D.; Jeannerod, M.; et al. (1994). "Mapping motor representations with positron emission tomography". Nature. 371 (6498): 600–602. Bibcode:1994Natur.371..600D. doi:10.1038/371600a0. PMID 7935791. S2CID 4243701.

== See also ==
- Cognitive Science
- Neuropsychology
- Psychiatry
- Motor cognition
- Mental Practice of Action
- Motor imagery
- Neuroscience
- Neurophysiology
- Sense of agency
- Schizophrenia
- Experimental psychology
