= Self-governance =

Mode of governance

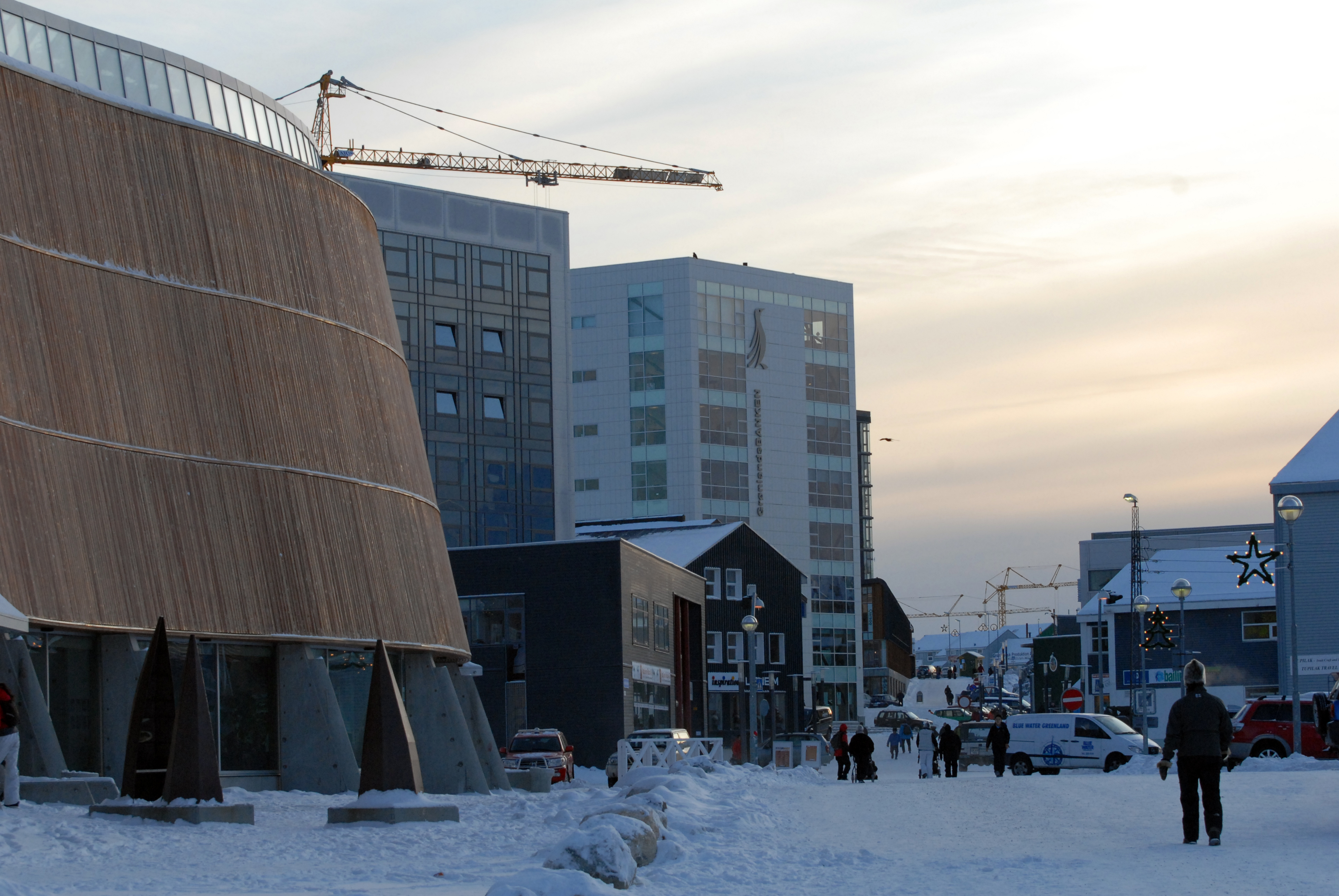
Greenland, an autonomous territory of the Kingdom of Denmark, has been self-governed since 2009. Pictured: Downtown Nuuk.

Self-governance, self-government, self-sovereignty or self-rule is the ability of a person or group to exercise all necessary functions of regulation without intervention from an external authority. It may refer to personal conduct or to any form of institution, such as family units, social groups, affinity groups, legal bodies, industry bodies, religions, and political entities of various degrees. Self-governance is closely related to various philosophical and socio-political concepts such as autonomy, independence, self-control, self-discipline, and sovereignty.

In the context of nation states, self-governance is called national sovereignty which is an important concept in international law. In the context of administrative division, a self-governing territory is called an autonomous region. Self-governance is also associated with political contexts in which a population or demographic becomes independent from colonial rule, absolute government, absolute monarchy, or any government that they perceive does not adequately represent them. It is therefore a fundamental tenet of many democracies, republics and nationalist governments. Mahatma Gandhi's term "swaraj" is a branch of this self-rule ideology. Henry David Thoreau was a major proponent of self-rule in lieu of immoral governments.

== Background ==
This principle has been explored in philosophy for centuries, with figures in ancient Greek philosophy such as Plato positing that self-mastery is necessary for true freedom. Plato believed that individuals or groups cannot achieve freedom unless they govern their own pleasures and desires, and instead will be in a state of enslavement. He states that self-mastery is the ability to be one's own master, it means being able to control one's own impulses and desires, rather than being controlled by them. Accordingly, this principle is not only a fundamental moral freedom but also as a necessary condition of political freedom and by extension the freedom and autonomy of any political structure.

John Locke further developed this idea, arguing that genuine freedom requires cognitive self-discipline and self-government. He believed that man's capacity for self-governance is the source of all freedom. He believed that freedom is not a possession but an action, that is, it is not something that you have but something you do. Locke proposes that rationality is the key to true agency and autonomy, and that political governance is enabled by the governing of one's own judgement. His political philosophy was a prominent influence on Immanuel Kant, and was later taken up in part by the Founding Fathers of the United States.

The nature of self-governance, that freedom relies upon self-regulation, has further been explored by contemporary academics Gilles Deleuze, Michel Foucault, Judith Butler, William E. Connolly, and others.

Self-governance is not just a philosophical concept but also a practical one. It can be seen in various forms such as self-regulation, self-control, self-management and self-leadership. It is an important concept in the fields of management, leadership, and governance, and is seen as a key to achieving personal and organizational goals. Self-governance can also be seen in the context of community and society, where it refers to the ability of individuals to take responsibility for their own actions and the actions of their community.

Additionally, self-governance is also closely related to the concept of self-determination. Self-determination refers to the idea that individuals and groups have the right to govern themselves, to make decisions about their own lives and to determine their own future and political status without outside interference. This concept is closely linked to the idea of self-governance because it emphasizes the importance of individuals and groups being able to take control of their own lives and to make decisions about their own future. It is also closely linked to the idea of autonomy, which refers to the ability of individuals and groups to make decisions for themselves, without external influence or control.

According to Adam Przeworski, ideals of self-government have run into logical, practical, and political problems. He has argued that perfect self-government is difficult to achieve due to:

- Incapacity in achieving socio-economic inequality
- Incapacity in making people feel as if they are represented
- Incapacity in ensuring that governments do what they are mandated to do
- Incapacity in balancing order and non-interference

== Means of self-governance ==
The means of self-governance usually comprises some or all of the following:

- A code of conduct that outlines acceptable behavior within the unit or group. This may include a legal or ethical code (e.g. the Hippocratic Oath of doctors, or established codes of professional ethics).
- A means of ensuring external authority does not become involved unless and until certain criteria are satisfied.
- A means of facilitating the intended functions of the unit or group.
- A means of registering and resolving grievances (e.g. medical malpractice, union procedures, and for achieving closure regarding them).
- A means of disciplinary procedure within the unit or group, ranging from fines and censure up to and including penalty of death.
- A means of suppressing parties, factions, tendencies, or other sub-groups that seek to secede from the unit or group.

== See also ==
- Anarchism
- Autonomy
- Consent of the governed
- Secession
- Self-determination
- Self-governing colony
- Self-management
- Self-ownership
- Sociocracy
- Swaraj
- Decentralization
