= Paul D. Thacker =

American journalist

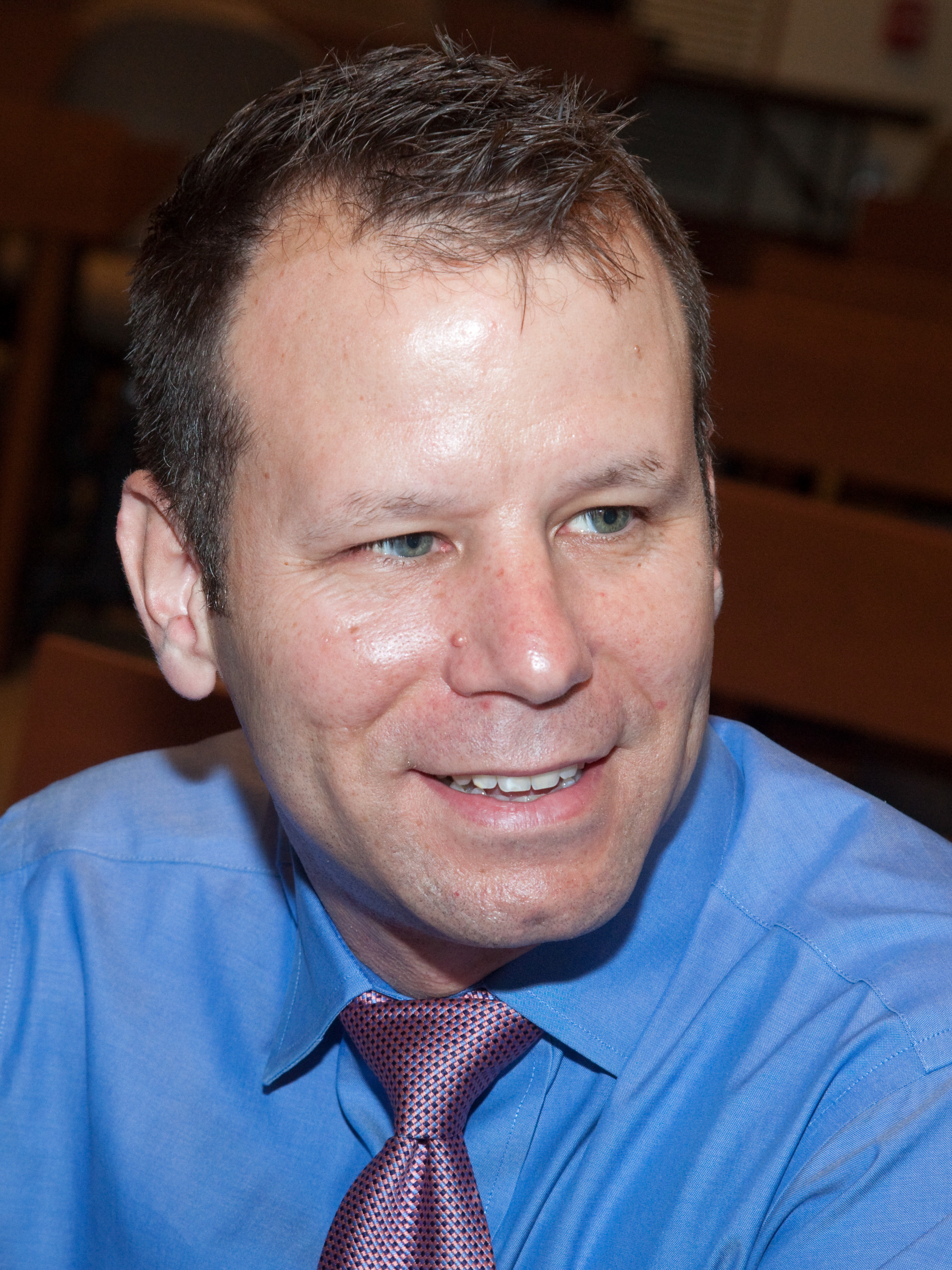
Paul D. Thacker in 2011

Paul D. Thacker (born January 1970) is an American journalist who reports on science, medicine, and the environment. He was a lead investigator of the U.S. Senate Committee on Finance for Republican Senator Chuck Grassley, where he examined financial links between physicians and pharmaceutical companies.

== Early life ==
Thacker was born in January 1970 and raised in California and Texas, and joined the US Army after high school, where he was deployed in Saudi Arabia and Iraq during the Gulf War. He earned a Bachelor of Science degree in biology, with an emphasis in ecology and evolution, from the University of California, Davis in 1997. He worked as a laboratory technician at Emory University before turning to journalism, leaving Emory for an Audubon magazine internship in 2000.

== Career ==
After 2000, Thacker wrote for publications such as The New Republic and Salon and was a staff writer with Environmental Science & Technology, a journal of the American Chemical Society (ACS). Here he published a series of exposés that a senior ACS official claimed showed an anti-industry bias, culminating in an article on the Weinberg Group that resulted in him being fired by the journal in 2006. In Thacker's Weinberg Group story he wrote about a letter that group sent to DuPont outlining a plan to protect DuPont from litigation and regulation over Teflon. The Weinberg Group had done similar work for Big Tobacco and then began working in Europe to defeat alcohol regulations. ACS editor Rudy Baum called the Weinberg article a "hatchet job". In 2006, the Weinberg article won a second place prize in annual awards presented by the US Society of Environmental Journalists. Later that year, Thacker's work was profiled on Exposé: America's Investigative Reports.

In 2007, Thacker joined the United States Senate Committee on Finance for Republican Senator Chuck Grassley, investigating medical research conflicts of interest. Among his work he identified several physicians who had failed to disclose payments from drug and medical companies, including psychiatrist Charles Nemeroff. He also led the committee's investigation of the drug Avandia, which included a report that a medical journal had published a ghostwritten article promoting the drug. He left the committee in 2010 to join the Project on Government Oversight (POGO), a nonprofit watchdog organization. In November 2010, Thacker co-wrote a letter on behalf of POGO to the National Institutes of Health claiming that psychiatrist Alan Schatzberg and others had a report on the antidepressant Paxil ghostwritten for them by the pharmaceutical company GlaxoSmithKline. The chief executive of the publishing arm of the American Psychiatric Association declared the claim to be "not true." In response to a legal threat, POGO retracted the word "ghostwriting" in its letter.

In August 2015, Thacker and NYU professor Charles Seife wrote a blog post for the journal PLOS regarding scientific funding that resulted in multiple scientists expressing "grave offense at the authors' characterization of their situation." The journal retracted the article and apologized, promising that a "similar failure will not be repeated."

In June 2022, Thacker spread 5G misinformation by falsely claiming in an article for De Telegraaf that 5G technology is a threat to public health.

== Vaccine reporting ==
In November 2021, The BMJ published a piece by Thacker alleging there has been "poor practice" at Ventavia, one of the companies involved in the phase III evaluation trials of the Pfizer vaccine. The article was accessed 3.5 million times and according to Altmetric was "the third most-shared research output of all time". The report was enthusiastically embraced by anti-vaccination activists. Questioning Thacker's work in Science-Based Medicine, David Gorski wrote that his article presented facts without necessary context to misleading effect, playing up the seriousness of the noted problems. Some experts have expressed skepticism over the allegations made in the report. Vaccination expert Paul Offit has criticized the issues outlined in the report as being vague and has cautioned against assuming the claims made in it are true. The Association of British Science Writers chose the article as a finalist for the Steve Connor Award for Investigative Science Journalism. In December 2021, Thacker received the 2021 British Journalism Award for Specialist Journalism for a series of articles in The BMJ investigating undisclosed financial interests among medical experts advising the US and UK governments on vaccines. The award judges said "[t]his was expertly researched and written journalism on a subject of huge national importance."

Investigative journalist Russ Baker referred to Thacker as an "anti-vax" advocate.

In March 2025, Michael Hiltzik at the Los Angeles Times criticized "right-wing vaccine critic" Thacker for mischaracterizing a vaccine study by Akiko Iwasaki from Yale University. Published on his blog, The Disinformation Chronicle, Thacker claimed that the Yale study showed that long COVID patients may have been injured by vaccines. Reuters Fact Check said Thacker's post was "misleading" and that the study did not provide evidence supporting his claims.

According to an article in Politico, "anti-vaccine reporter" Paul Thacker was among a handful of reporters mentioned by RFK Jr whose journalism is no longer carried by the mainstream media and has been "relegated to Substack".
