= Wolfgang Prinz =

German cognitive psychologist

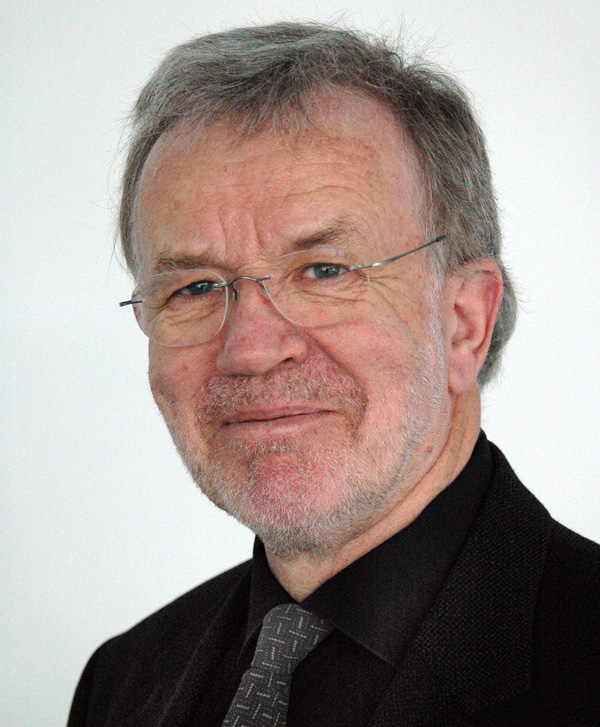
- Born: 24 September 1942 (age 83); Ebern, Bavaria
- Education: University of Münster
- Known for: The common coding theory
- Awards: Gottfried Wilhelm Leibniz Award of the German Research Foundation
- Scientific career
- Fields: Cognitive Psychology
- Workplaces: Max Planck Institute (professor, director)

Wolfgang Prinz (born 24 September 1942) is a German cognitive psychologist. He was director at the Max Planck Institute for Human Cognitive and Brain Sciences in Leipzig, Germany, and an internationally recognized expert in experimental psychology, cognitive psychology and philosophy of mind. He is the founder of the common coding theory between perception and action that has a significant impact in cognitive neuroscience and social cognition.

== Background ==
Wolfgang Prinz studied Psychology, Philosophy and Zoology at the University of Münster (Germany) from 1962 to 1966, and was awarded a doctorate from the Ruhr University in Bochum, Germany, in 1970. Prinz was a director of the Max Planck Institute for Psychological Research Munich, Germany, from 1990 to 2004. Since 2004 he has been a director at the Max Planck Institute for Human Cognitive and Brain Sciences, Leipzig, Germany.

== Memberships in Research Councils and Societies ==
Academia Europaea; German Academy of Natural Scientist Leopoldina, Halle (Saale), Germany; Scientific Advisory Board of the Centre for Interdisciplinary Research (ZiF), University of Bielefeld, Germany; Advisory Board of the Dean, School of Humanities and Social Sciences, Jacobs University Bremen, Germany; Honorary Member of the European Society of Psychology (ESCoP); Psychonomic Society; German Society of Psychology (DGPs).

== Academic achievements ==
Prinz is the father of the common coding theory. This theory claims parity between perception and action. Its core assumption is that actions are coded in terms of the perceivable effects (i.e., the distal perceptual events) they should generate Performing a movement leaves behind a bidirectional association between the motor pattern it has generated by and the sensory effects that it produces. Such an association can then be used backwards to retrieve a movement by anticipating its effects. These perception/action codes are also accessible during action observation (for an historical account of the ideo-motor principle, see Observation of an action should activate action representations to the degree that the perceived and the represented action are similar. Such a claim suggests that we represent observed, executed and imagined actions in a commensurate manner and makes specific predictions regarding the nature of action and perceptual representations. First, representations for observed and executed actions should rely on a shared neural substrate. Second, a common cognitive system predicts interference effects when action and perception attempt to access shared representations simultaneously. Third, such a system predicts facilitation of action based on directly prior perception and vice versa.

The common coding theory has received strong support from a variety of empirical studies in developmental psychology, cognitive neuroscience, cognitive science and neurophysiology. This theory is at the core of what has been called Motor cognition. In neuroscience, evidence for the common coding theory ranges from electrophysiological recordings in monkeys in which mirror neurons in the ventral premotor and posterior parietal cortices fire both during goal-directed actions and observation of the same actions performed by another individual, to functional neuroimaging experiments in humans which indicate that the neural circuits involved in action execution partly overlap with those activated when actions are observed.

== Selected works ==
- Meltzoff, A. & Prinz, W. (2002). "The Imitative Mind: Development, Evolution and Brain Bases." Cambridge: Cambridge University Press.
- Schütz-Bosbach, S., & Prinz, W. (2007). "Perceptual resonance: Action-induced modulation of perception." Trends in Cognitive Sciences, 11(8), 349–355.
- Prinz, W. (2006). "Free will as a social institution." In S. Pockett, W. P. Banks, & S. Gallagher (Eds.), Does consciousness cause behavior? (pp. 257–276). Cambridge, Massachusetts: MIT Press.
- Bosbach, S., Cole, J., Prinz, W., & Knoblich, G. (2005). "Inferring another's expectation from action: The role of peripheral sensation." Nature Neuroscience, 8(10), 1295–1297.
- Drost, U. C., Rieger, M., Brass, M., Gunter, T. C., & Prinz, W. (2005). "When hearing turns into playing: Movement induction by auditory stimuli in pianists." The Quarterly Journal of Experimental Psychology, Section A: Human Experimental Psychology, 58A(8), 1376–1389.
- Prinz, W. (2012). Open minds: The social making of agency and intentionality. Cambridge, Massachusetts: MIT Press.
- Prinz, W., Beisert, M., & Herwig, A. (Eds.). (2013). Action science: Foundations of an emerging discipline. Cambridge, Massachusetts: MIT Press.

== See also ==
- Experimental psychology
- Social cognition
- Motor cognition
- Sense of agency
- Imitation
- Philosophy
