= Floris de Lange =

Cognitive Neuroscientist at Donders Institute for Brain, Cognition and Behaviour

- Born: Floris de Lange; 1977 (age 48–49)
- Education: Radboud University
- Scientific career
- Fields: Cognitive Neuroscientist; Predictive Coding; Perceptual Decision Making; Computational modelling; Attention; Prediction; Cognition
- Workplaces: Donders Institute
- Thesis: "Neural mechanisms of motor imagery" (2008)
- Doctoral advisor: Peter Hagoort (promotor) & Ivan Toni (co-promotor)
- Website: https://www.predictivebrainlab.com/

Floris de Lange (born 1977) is a cognitive neuroscientist known for his contributions in the fields of perception research, and predictive coding using laminar fMRI, magnetoencephalography, computational modeling, and AI models for neuroscience. Currently, de Lange holds the position of Principal Investigator at the Donders Center for Cognitive Neuroimaging, where he established the Predictive Brain Lab. Additionally, he serves as a senior editor at eLife and he is professor of Perception and Cognition at the Faculty of Social Sciences of the Radboud University Nijmegen (since 2018).

== Education ==
De Lange completed his first Master's degree in Neuropsychology in 2001 and his second Master's degree in Artificial Intelligence in 2003 at Radboud University Nijmegen. Building on this foundation, he graduated with a Ph.D. degree in cognitive neuroscience focused on motor imagery at the same university. During his doctoral studies guided by Ivan Toni, "Neural mechanisms of motor imagery" (2008), de Lange explored how mental stimulations of perception and action are neurally implemented employing fMRI and MEG techniques. De Lange's findings suggested that motor imagery involves a realistic internal simulation of actions, subject to similar influences from external factors like proprioception. In addition, his studies revealed that the simulation involved in motor imagery is largely implicit and appears unaffected by alterations in psychological factors such as fatigue, motivation, or self-monitoring. De Lange opened a field of questions on whether action observation triggers a simulation similar to motor imagery and whether both processes draw upon the same cognitive mechanisms for different purposes.

== Career and research ==
Transitioning to a post-doctoral role from 2007 to 2009, de Lange worked in the laboratory of Prof. Stanislas Dehaene at NeuroSpin neuroimaging center in Paris, France. During this period, he focused on investigating the neural dynamics involved in conscious and unconscious decision-making processes.

In 2009, de Lange established the Predictive Brain Lab at the Donders Institute. As a principal investigator, de Lange focuses primarily on the neural and cognitive mechanisms underlying predictive processing during perception and decision-making. Specifically, de Lange's research explores how perception arises by combining various forms of prior knowledge with incoming information in the brain, and in particular how the brain may operate as a prediction machine.

De Lange's main research focus lies on the question of how the brain's continuous stream of predictions is generated at the neurobiological level. He explores how predictions are represented in the brain, and how the information that it provides can be combined with new sensorial input. His research illustrates the notion that the brain is not a machine that processes information passively, but rather a prediction machine that actively uses prior knowledge to predict the future. Specifically, de Lange has made contributions to the understanding of how, when, and why the visual brain combines predictions with visual information. Another one of his discoveries was that visual imagery and visual input activate distinct layers of the primary visual cortex. Currently, de Lange is also looking into the underlying mechanisms of surprise and its relationship with curiosity.

Together with researchers Micha Heilbron and Peter Kok, de Lange co-authored the review article "How do expectations shape perception?" published in 2018 in Trends in Cognitive Neuroscience. The article focused on understanding how the brain utilizes prior knowledge to influence neural computations in perception. At the same time, the authors reviewed methodological approaches to do so, promoting the application of multi-site activity with laminar profiling precision in neuroscientific measurement.

== Public engagement ==
Floris de Lange has had several media appearances as an expert in perception and expectation neuroscience. Among others, he appeared in RTL Nieuws and de Gelderlander discussing neural mechanisms of perception.

In 2020, he was the first guest of the VPRO series Big questions (in dutch: Grote Vragen), in which he was invited as a cognitive neuroscientist to explain some of his insight to the general public, whilst visiting some of the places that initially inspired him to join the field.

In 2021, he received the Ammodo Science Award.

== Teaching ==
Floris de Lange has served as a full professor of perception and cognition since 2018 at the Radboud University Nijmegen in partnership with the Donders Institute. Specifically, his instructional focus encompasses the courses Attention and Prediction and Cognitive Control and Decision Making, as well as Neurophysiology of Cognition and Behavior.

== Key publications ==
- de Lange, Floris P.; Heilbron, Micha; Kok, Peter (2018). "How Do Expectations Shape Perception?". Trends in Cognitive Sciences. 22 (9): 764–779. doi:10.1016/j.tics.2018.06.002. hdl:2066/194337. ISSN 1364-6613. PMID 30122170.
- Fritsche, Matthias; Spaak, Eelke; de Lange, Floris P (2020-06-01). Serences, John T; Gold, Joshua I; Sheehan, Timothy (eds.). "A Bayesian and efficient observer model explains concurrent attractive and repulsive history biases in visual perception". eLife. 9 e55389. doi:10.7554/eLife.55389. ISSN 2050-084X. PMC 7286693. PMID 32479264.
- Heilbron, Micha; Armeni, Kristijan; Schoffelen, Jan-Mathijs; Hagoort, Peter; de Lange, Floris P. (2022-08-09). "A hierarchy of linguistic predictions during natural language comprehension". Proceedings of the National Academy of Sciences. 119 (32) e2201968119. Bibcode:2022PNAS..11901968H. doi:10.1073/pnas.2201968119. ISSN 0027-8424. PMC 9371745. PMID 35921434.
- Kok, Peter; Mostert, Pim; de Lange, Floris P. (2017-09-26). "Prior expectations induce prestimulus sensory templates". Proceedings of the National Academy of Sciences. 114 (39): 10473–10478. Bibcode:2017PNAS..11410473K. doi:10.1073/pnas.1705652114. ISSN 0027-8424. PMC 5625909. PMID 28900010.
- Lawrence, Samuel JD; Norris, David G; de Lange, Floris P (2019-05-07). Büchel, Christian; Frank, Michael J; Büchel, Christian (eds.). "Dissociable laminar profiles of concurrent bottom-up and top-down modulation in the human visual cortex". eLife. 8 e44422. doi:10.7554/eLife.44422. ISSN 2050-084X. PMC 6538372. PMID 31063127.

== Awards and honors ==
De Lange has received several awards and a large number of grants for his research, including an ERC Starting Grant, ERC Consolidator Grant, a Veni grant, Vidi grant and Vici grant from NWO, and the Heineken Young Scientist Award (2012) for Cognitive Science:

- NWO Vici Innovational Research Incentives Scheme Award (2024)
- Ammodo Science Award for fundamental research (2021)
- USERN Prize in Social Sciences (2016)
- NWO Vidi Innovational Research Incentives Scheme Award (2015)
- Young Academy Member of the Royal Netherlands Academy of Arts and Sciences (KNAW) (2014)
- Cortex Prize of the Federation of the European Societies of Neuropsychology (FESN) (2013)
- James S. McDonnell Scholar Award for Understanding Human Cognition (2013)
- Heineken Young Scientist Award for Cognitive Science (2012)
