= Lawrence Weiskrantz =

British psychologist (1926–2018)

Lawrence Weiskrantz FRS
- Born: 28 March 1926
- Died: 27 January 2018 (aged 91)
- Citizenship: British
- Education: Swarthmore College
- Known for: blindsight
- Scientific career
- Fields: psychology, neuropsychology, cognitive neuroscience
- Workplaces: Oxford University

Lawrence Weiskrantz FRS (28 March 1926 – 27 January 2018) was a British neuropsychologist. Weiskrantz is credited with discovering the phenomenon of blindsight, and with establishing the role of the amygdala in emotional learning and emotional behavior. Blindsight is when a person with a brain injury causing blindness can nevertheless detect, point accurately at, and discriminate visually presented objects.

== Early life ==
Weiskrantz originally attended Girard College, a boarding school in Philadelphia, due in part to the death of his father when he was six. After graduating, he attended Swarthmore College and served in World War II. Shortly before his graduation, he was awarded a Catherwood fellowship at Oxford University.

== Career ==
Weiskrantz became Professor of Psychology at Oxford University where he remained a full professor until retirement in 1993. He then became an emeritus professor of the university and an emeritus fellow of Magdalen College. Weiskrantz had a lifelong interest in the writings and research of the Russian neuropsychologist Alexander Luria, whom he had met and befriended while Luria was still doing research. The two remained colleagues until Luria's death in 1977. In the 1950s Weiskrantz went on to ellucidate the region of the temporal lobe responsible for the erratic emotional behaviors in Klüver-Bucy syndrome, a phenomenon known since the 1930 which came to inspire the limbic brain hypothesis of emotion. Although this hypothesis did not live to its claims, Weiskrantz used instrumental fear conditioning in lesioned animals to identify the temporal structure responsible for Klüver-Bucy syndrome. Ever since, the amygdala has remained crucial in the scientific understanding of emotion. Weiskrantz is generally credited with having discovered the phenomenon of blindsight following his book on this subject in 1986, which is the voluntary visually evoked response to a stimulus presented within a scotoma.

Academic and service positions he held included:

- Part-time Lecturer, Tufts University, 1952
- Research Associate, Inst. of Living, 1952–55
- Senior Postdoctoral Fellow, US National Research Council, 1955–56
- Research Associate, University of Cambridge, 1956–61
- Assistant Director of Research, Cambridge, 1961–66
- Reader in Physiological Psychology, Cambridge Univ., 1966–67.
- Founding President of the European Brain and Behaviour Society, 1969
- Professor of Psychology, Oxford University, and Fellow, Magdalen College, Oxford, 1967–1993;
- Professor Emeritus, Oxford University, 1993–2018 and Emeritus Fellow, Magdalen College, Oxford, 1993–2018.
- Honorary President of European Society for Philosophy and Psychology.
- Inaugural President of European Brain and Behaviour Society.
- President of Association for Scientific Study of Consciousness.

Weiskrantz supervised at least 10 PhDs, including Alan Cowey, Charles Gross, Nicholas Humphrey, Susan Iversen, and Melvyn A. Goodale.

== Honours ==
Weiskrantz was elected a Fellow of the Royal Society in 1980. He was on its council in 1988–1989. He was a member of the U.S. National Academy of Sciences, and of Academia Europaea. Weiskrantz served on the Council of the Fyssen Foundation.

Weiskrantz was a medalist of the Royal Society of Medicine and a medalist of the American Association for Advancement of Science. He delivered the Heisenberg Lecture of the Bavarian Academy of Sciences/Siemens Foundation and the Ferrier Lecture of the Royal Society. In 1997 he was awarded with an honorary doctorate at Tilburg University, the Netherlands.

== Selected publications ==
- Analysis of Behavioural Change, 1967
- The Neuropsychology of Cognitive Function, 1982
- Animal Intelligence, 1985
- Blindsight: A case Study and Implications, 1986 ISBN 0198521294
- Thought Without Language, 1988
- Consciousness Lost and Found, 1997
