= Weinberg Group =

The Weinberg Group Inc.
- Type: Private
- Industry: Food and Drug Administration; Pharmaceuticals; Medical Devices; Biotech; Consulting
- Founded: 1983
- Headquarters: Washington, DC, USA
- Key people: Matthew Weinberg, CEO
- Products: Food and drug regulatory consulting for pharmaceutical, biotech and medical device companies
- Number of employees: ~ 50
- Website: Official website

The Weinberg Group is a Washington, DC–based food and drug regulatory consulting group. Founded in 1983, the firm assists pharmaceutical and biotech companies with the "development and implementation of successful and innovative regulatory strategies" and also helps these companies to "remediate, maintain and improve their regulatory compliance." The Weinberg Group sent a memo to DuPont in 2003 recommending that the company “reshape the debate by identifying the likely known health benefits of PFOA exposure.”

== BPA congressional investigation ==
In February 2008, John D. Dingell (D-MI) and Bart Stupak (D-MI) of the United States House of Representatives announced that their ongoing investigation into Bisphenol A (BPA) had broadened to include The Weinberg Group. In March 2008, ABC News reported that the U.S. Congress was investigating the Weinberg Group. Representative John Dingell said, "The tactics apparently employed by the Weinberg Group raise serious questions about whether science is for sale at these consulting groups, and the effect this faulty science might have on the public health." The House Energy and Commerce Committee, which Dingell chairs, asked the firm for records of its work on Bisphenol A and other chemicals. Some studies indicate that Bisphenol A, which is present in a wide range of plastics, is an endocrine disruptor and "can disrupt hormone systems in laboratory animals and possibly increase the risk of cancer or other serious illness." Canada and ten US states have moved to ban the chemical from baby bottles, and in February the U.S. National Toxicology Program released a report concluding that "there is some concern for neural and behavioral effects in fetuses, infants, and children at current human exposures," and that "bisphenol A exposure in these populations based on effects in the prostate gland, mammary gland, and an earlier age for puberty in females."

According to the Center for Science in the Public Interest, the committee also "accused the firm of generating false uncertainty about scientific research that cast a negative light on their clients’ products. After showing deleted pages from the Weinberg Group's website boasting about its work for two pharmaceutical clients, the committee demanded the firm hand over documents naming the drug, the drug manufacturer and the experts used to prevent the drug's ban. The group has also been accused of working to cast doubt on research linking a brand-name hair dye to cancer and the impact of chlorofluorocarbons on the ozone layer."

The U.S. Congress investigated statements that allegedly appeared on the firm's website claiming that it successfully kept on sale, for 10 years, a drug that was eventually cancelled as harmful.

In response, CEO Matthew Weinberg issued a statement saying "The analyses we conduct are rigorous and adhere to established principles of scientific integrity […] We believe it is in the public interest for all scientific research to be subject to scrutiny and the views of all affected parties to be heard."

The goal of any PFAS policy or regulation should be to determine the most effective steps needed to reduce human exposure and implement them within the broad context of protecting human health. This requires differentiating high concentration sites from background concentrations and taking action to mitigate concentrations at high use sites. It also demands both a reassessment of products we produce and use daily, and a realistic assessment of how to control PFAS chemicals already in the background environment.

== Clients ==
The Weinberg Group has consulted for a number of pharmaceutical, chemical, and tobacco companies. Chemicals that the Group has worked on include trichloroethylene (TCE), Teflon (see below), PCBs, Bisphenol A, and the organochlorine insecticide endosulfan. In 2007, The Weinberg Group was a sponsor of the International Society of Regulatory Toxicology & Pharmacology, a group described as "an association of dominated by scientists who work for industry trade groups and consulting firms," by David Michaels. Since 2006, The Weinberg Group has been a sponsor of The Washington Legal Clinic for the Homeless event – Lawyer's Pitch In. The Washington Legal Clinic for the Homeless is described as providing legal services to people facing homelessness in DC.

=== The Weinburg proposal ===
In an article authored by Paul D. Thacker, Environmental Science & Technology reported that in April 2003, the Weinberg Group proposed a strategy to DuPont to help defuse the growing controversy over the health impacts of perfluorooctanoic acid (PFOA), a compound used to make Teflon. PFAS are commonly found in every American household, and in products as diverse as non- stick cookware, stain resistant furniture and carpets, wrinkle free and water repellant clothing, cosmetics, lubricants, paint, pizza boxes, popcorn bags, and many other everyday products. Weinberg's vice-president of Product Defense, P. Terrence Gaffney, wrote in the February 22, 2006 The Weinberg proposal, "DuPont must shape the debate at all levels." One of his suggested strategies was to facilitate the "publication of papers and articles dispelling the alleged nexus between PFOA and teratogenicity as well as other claimed harm."

Gaffney also proposed to "develop 'blue ribbon panels' of thought leaders on issues related to PFOA" and to "coordinate the publishing of white papers on PFOA, junk science and the limits of medical monitoring." DuPont confirmed that they had hired the Weinberg Group to help with "scientific third party experts." The five-page 2003 letter also states that the Weinberg Group "has helped numerous companies manage issues allegedly related to environmental exposures. Beginning with Agent Orange in 1983, we have successfully guided clients through myriad regulatory, litigation and public relations challenges posed by those whose agenda is to grossly over regulate, extract settlements from, or otherwise damage the chemical manufacturing industry."

=== Alcohol industry ===
In an editorial that ran in the British Medical Journal, Martin McKee, a professor of public health at the London School of Hygiene and Tropical Medicine, criticized the Weinberg Group for writing a white paper on alcohol regulation for the European alcohol industry. "Its approach is remarkably similar to the tobacco industry reports, contending that there is insufficient evidence that alcohol causes as much harm as is alleged or that preventive measures would be effective."

=== Tobacco industry ===
The Weinberg Group has also worked closely with the tobacco industry. Myron Weinberg, and the company bearing his name, have been acting as tobacco industry consultants, in particular for Philip Morris. Myron Weinberg is listed in a Philip Morris grants and projects budget as being paid $50,000 U.S.D. in 1995 alone for "Consulting Related to ETS Projects." Philip Morris budgeted $250,000 for the Weinberg Group for February to December 1998 to organize a risk management conference and help develop and publicize a body of academic literature on risk management.

The Weinberg Group also assisted the tobacco industry's law firm, Covington & Burling, with implementing a multinational Environmental Tobacco Smoke scientific witness program (also known as the "Whitecoat Project.") A Covington & Burling internal document dated 1988 claims the purpose of the meeting was "to discuss ETS as a public affair as well as a scientific issue – and to begin discussion of the role that consulting scientists can play in promoting an objective understanding of the issue among members of the scientific community, government officials and members of the public."

== Building STEPS ==
Building STEPS is a private non-profit organization, founded in 1995 by Matthew Weinberg, CEO of The Weinberg Group, that was developed to expose bright, underserved students to professions that rely on science and technology and to help them excel in these fields where minorities are overwhelmingly underrepresented. Headquartered in Baltimore, Maryland since 1999, 90% of the students graduating from this two-year, academic and professional development program matriculate to college.
