= Binding and Retrieval in Action Control =

Binding and Retrieval in Action Control (BRAC) is a theoretical framework to explain basic psychological functions at the intersection of perception and motor control. It takes a cognitive approach by capturing how events are represented in the cognitive system. Its two core mechanisms – binding and retrieval of feature codes – explain a variety of observations in basic psychological experiments within a compact and parsimonious framework.

== Binding and retrieval ==
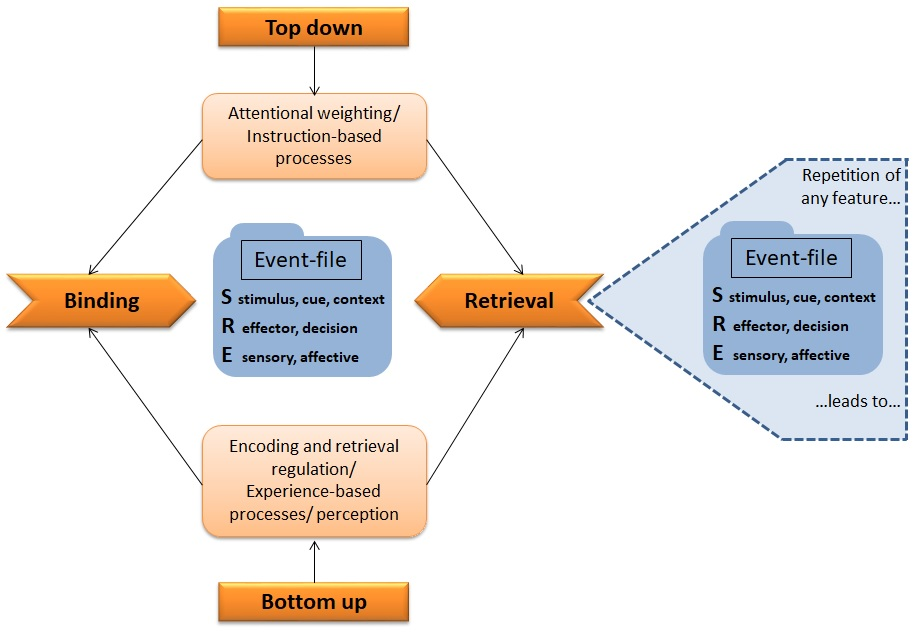
Figure 1. Graphical summary of the BRAC framework. Click to enlarge.

Many influential theories have proposed that the human cognitive system represents events in terms of distributed feature codes. For instance, color and shape of an object in the visual field give rise to neural activity in distinct brain areas. This distributed activity has to be synchronized to create a visual impression of this object. In other words: Distributed features are bound into integrated representations.
Crucially, the BRAC framework suggests that such bindings persist in time. They further integrate features from distinct events, such as features relating to the current stimulation, the agent's motor response, and corresponding effects of this response. The BRAC framework imports the theoretical concept of common coding of sensory and action events in a shared representational format, allowing for direct interactions and associations of perceptual and action features.
Compound representations of such features are labelled event files. Once bound, re-encountering any feature will retrieve previously stored event files. Because these event files contain features of a previous response, such retrieval provides an efficient shortcut by recycling previously used feature codes.
The BRAC framework emphasizes that binding and retrieval are separate mechanisms. They can therefore be subject to different influences as shown in Figure 1. These influence can stem from top down factors and bottom up factors alike. Disentangling these separable contributions of binding and retrieval is a major goal of current work inspired by the BRAC framework.

== Experimental observations ==
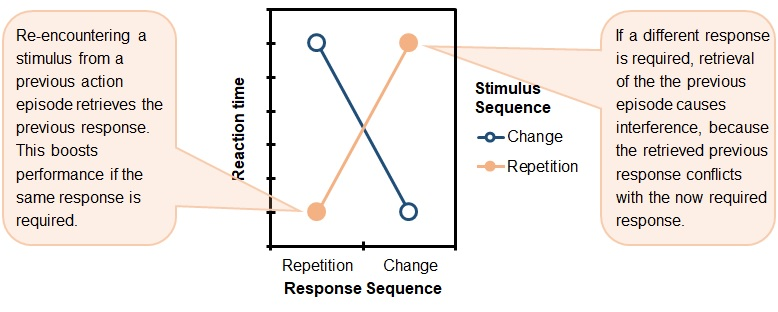
Figure 2. Idealized results from a behavioral experiment that measures performance (reaction times) in successive choice responses as a function of response sequence and stimulus sequence for two successive responses. Click to enlarge.

The BRAC framework highlights the sequential dependency of human actions. Corresponding binding and retrieval effects have been observed in a range of experimental setups, including prime-probe experiments and sequential choice reaction tasks. Key measures in these studies have been reaction times and error rates for speeded responses. These performance measures vary as a joint function of feature sequences for responses and corresponding stimulation: Stimulus repetitions (as compared to stimulus changes) from one occasion to the next facilitate response repetitions rather than response changes. Figure 2 shows an idealized pattern of results as predicted by the BRAC framework.

== Current research ==
A key question of current research on the BRAC framework concerns the relation of short-term binding on the one hand, and long-term learning of stable associations on the other hand. Further unresolved questions pertain to the moment that binding takes place, and to possible bottom-up and top-down influences on both binding and retrieval.
