= European Brain and Behaviour Society =

The European Brain and Behaviour Society (EBBS) is a scientific society founded in 1968 whose stated purpose is the exchange of information between European scientists interested in the relationships between brain mechanisms and behaviour. It is the oldest neuroscience society in Europe. Notable past presidents include Lawrence Weiskrantz, Giacomo Rizzolatti, Marc Jeannerod, John Aggleton, Barry Everitt, Susan Sara, Carmen Sandi and Francesca Cirulli; the current president is Igor Branchi. The EBBS is a founding member of the Federation of European Neuroscience Societies. In years that there are no federation meetings, EBBS organises a stand-alone meeting.

== Past and current presidents ==
The following persons have been presidents of EBBS:

- 2023–2025 Ewelina Knapska
- 2021–2023 Igor Branchi
- 2019–2021 Mathias Schmidt
- 2017–2019 Francesca Cirulli
- 2015–2017 Bruno Poucet
- 2013–2014 Martine Ammassari-Teule
- 2011–2012 Carmen Sandi
- 2009–2010 Richard Frackowiak
- 2007–2008 Giorgio Innocenti
- 2005–2006 John Aggleton
- 2003–2004 Susan Sara
- 2001–2002 Wolfram Schultz
- 1999–2000 Barry Everitt
- 1997–1998 Petra Stoerig
- 1995–1996 Lawrence Weiskrantz
- 1993–1994 C.A. Marzi
- 1991–1992 Klaus-Peter Hoffmann
- 1989–1990 Marc Jeannerod
- 1987–1988 Alan Cowey
- 1985–1986 Giacomo Rizzolatti
- 1983–1984 Pierre Karli
- 1981–1982 I. Steele Russell
- 1979–1980 M.W. van Hof
- 1977–1978 Otto Creutzfeldt
- 1975–1976 M. Frankenhäuser
- 1973–1974 E. De Renzi
- 1971–1972 Jacques Paillard
- 1970 K. Akert
- 1969 Lawrence Weiskrantz
