= John Aggleton =

British behavioural neuroscientist

John Aggleton FRS, FMedSci, FLSW
- Born: 14 June 1955 (age 71); Cardiff, Wales
- Citizenship: United Kingdom
- Education: University of Oxford
- Scientific career
- Fields: Behavioural neuroscience
- Institutions: University of Durham, Cardiff University
- Thesis: Anatomical and Functional Subdivisions of the Amygdala (1980)
- Doctoral advisor: R.E. Passingham
- Website: www.cardiff.ac.uk/people/view/58045-aggleton-john

John Aggleton FRS FMedSci FLSW (born 14 June 1955 in Cardiff) is a British behavioural neuroscientist.

== Education and career ==
Aggleton obtained his B.A. in natural sciences in 1976 at Cambridge University and his Ph.D. with his thesis entitled Anatomical and Functional Subdivisions of the Amygdala in 1980 from the University of Oxford. From 1983 he was first lecturer and then from 1992 senior lecturer in the department of psychology at the University of Durham. Since 1994, he has been professor of cognitive neuroscience at Cardiff University, where he studies the architecture of the brain and how various brain structures work together to provide different forms of memory.

== Honours and community service ==
Aggleton was elected a Fellow of the Learned Society of Wales in 2011, a Fellow of the Academy of Medical Sciences and a Fellow of the Royal Society in 2012. He was president of the European Brain and Behaviour Society from 2005 to 2006 and of the British Neuroscience Association from 2015 to 2017. He is a member of the editorial boards of Behavioral Neuroscience, Behavioural Brain Research, Neuropsychologia, and Neuroscience & Biobehavioral Reviews.
