= Attentional shift =

Cognitive process related to executive functions

Attentional shift (or shift of attention) occurs when directing attention to a point increases the efficiency of processing of that point and includes inhibition to decrease attentional resources to unwanted or irrelevant inputs. Shifting of attention is needed to allocate attentional resources to more efficiently process information from a stimulus. Research has shown that when an object or area is attended, processing operates more efficiently. Task switching costs occur when performance on a task suffers due to the increased effort added in shifting attention. There are competing theories that attempt to explain why and how attention is shifted as well as how attention is moved through space in attentional control.

== Unitary resource and multiple resource models ==
According to the unitary resource model of attention, there is a single resource of attention divided among different tasks in different amounts, and attention is voluntarily shifted when demands on attention needed exceeds the limited supply of attentional resource available. In contrast, there are also multiple resource models of attention that propose that different attentional resources exist for different sensory and response modalities, which would mean that tasks requiring different senses or different kinds of responses should be easier to switch attention to and from, and that switching costs would be less for similar tasks than tasks that involve different resources.

== The spotlight and gradient theories ==
In attention research, one prominent theory attempting to explain how visual attention is shifted is the moving-spotlight theory. The primary idea being that attention is like a movable spotlight that is directed towards intended targets, focusing on each target in a serial manner. When information is illuminated by the spotlight, hence attended, processing proceeds in a more efficient manner, directing attention to a particular point and inhibiting input from any stimuli outside of the spotlight. However, when a shift of spatial attention occurs, the spotlight is, in effect, turned off while attention shifts to the next attended location.

Attention, however, has also been proposed to adhere to a gradient theory in which attentional resources are given to a region in space rather than a spotlight, so that attentional resources are most concentrated at the center of attentional focus and then decrease the further a stimuli is from the center. Attention in this theory reflects both current and previous attentional allocation, so that attention can build up and decay across more than one attentional fixation over time. This means that time to detect a target may be dependent upon where attention was directed before the target was presented and attention needed to be shifted.

== Three stages of attention orienting ==
Another influential idea came from Posner and Petersen in 1990, who theorized that the orienting of attention could be organized into three distinct stages. They argue that in order for a person to orient to a new location, they first have to disengage, or take attention away from where it is currently focusing. Next, the shifting of one's attention would occur from one stimulus to another. Finally, attention would be engaged, or focused onto the new target. This review attempts to look at the research regarding neural correlates of these physical shifts of attention, specifically focusing on the areas of covert and overt attention, as well as, voluntary and automatic attention shifts. Research often disagrees about the amount of overlap in the neural systems for these different types of attention, and therefore research supporting both views is discussed below.

== Overt vs. covert attention ==
Changes in spatial attention can occur with the eyes moving, overtly, or with the eyes remaining fixated, covertly. Within the human eye only a small part, the fovea, is able to bring objects into sharp focus. However, it is this high visual acuity that is needed to perform actions such as reading words or recognizing facial features, for example. Therefore, the eyes must continually move in order to direct the fovea to the desired goal. Prior to an overt eye movement, where the eyes move to a target location, covert attention shifts to this location. However, it is important to keep in mind that attention is also able to shift covertly to objects, locations, or even thoughts while the eyes remain fixated. For example, when a person is driving and keeping their eyes on the road, but then, even though their eyes do not move, their attention shifts from the road to thinking about what they need to get at the grocery store. The eyes may remain focused on the previous object attended to, yet attention has shifted.

=== Patient studies and attention shifts ===
Some of the first research into the neurology behind attention shifts came from examining brain damaged patients. First, Posner et al., studied persons affected by progressive supranuclear palsy, a condition wherein it is difficult to exert eye movements voluntarily, particularly vertical movements. Patients were found to have damage present in the mid-brain area and associated cortical areas. Although patients were not able to move their eyes, they were still able to shift attention covertly. However, there was a slowing of the process of shifting attention in these patients, suggesting that the mid-brain and cortical areas must be associated with covert attention shifts. Additionally, previous research has shown support for covert attention shifts being associated with activity in the parietal lobe. On the other hand, research seems to indicate differences in brain areas activated for overt attention shifts, as compared to covert shifts. Previous evidence has shown that the superior colliculus is associated with eye movements, or overt attention shifts. Additionally, the medial cerebellum has shown activation only during eye movements.

=== Neural overlap for overt and covert attention ===
Although, after reviewing Posner's research, it may seem logical to conclude that covert and overt attention shifts utilize different neural mechanisms, other more recent studies have shown more overlap than not. Multiple studies have shown activity evident in the frontal cortex, concentrating in the precentral sulcus, the parietal cortex, specifically in the intraparietal sulcus, and in the lateral occipital cortex for both overt and covert attention shifts. This is in support of the premotor theory of attention. While these studies may agree on the areas, they are not always in agreement on whether an overt or covert attentional shift causes more activation. Utilizing functional magnetic resonance imaging (fMRI) technology, Corbetta et al., found that overt and covert attention shift tasks showed activation within the same areas, namely, the frontal, parietal and temporal lobes. Additionally, this study reported that covert shifts of attention showed greater activity levels than in the overt attention condition. However, different tasks were used for the covert versus the overt condition. One task involved a probe being flashed to the subject's fovea, while another task showed the probe in the participant's peripheral vision, making it questionable whether these results can be directly compared. Nobre et al. also sought to determine whether covert and overt attention shifts revealed activation in the same brain areas. Once again fMRI technology was utilized, as well as, two separate tasks, one for covert attention and one for overt attention. Results showed overlap in activated areas for overt and covert attention shifts, mainly in the parietal and frontal lobes. However, one area was shown to be specific to covert attention, which was the right dorsolateral cortex; typically associated with voluntary attention shifts and working memory. One should question whether this additional activation has to do with the selected task for the covert condition, or rather if it is specific to a covert shift of attention.

Beauchamp et al. more recently attempted to reproduce these same results by performing a study utilizing the same task for both conditions, as well as across multiple shift rates. Results were in agreement that covert and overt attentional shifts engage the same neural mechanisms. However, this study differed in that overt shifts of attention showed greater activation in these neural areas, and this occurred even at multiple shift rates. Once again, the neural regions implicated in this study included the intraparietal sulcus, the precentral sulcus, and the lateral occipital cortex. This larger activation evident with overt attention shifts was attributed to the added involvement of eye movements.

== Voluntary vs. automatic shifts in attention ==
Attention can be directed either voluntarily, also referred to as endogenous control, or automatically, which is referred to as exogenous or reflexive attention. In endogenous control, attention is directed toward the stimulus voluntarily, usually by interpreting a cue that directs one to the target, whereas in exogenous control, attention is automatically drawn towards a stimulus The neural mechanisms in the brain have been shown to produce different patterns of activity for endogenous and exogenous attention.

=== Separate neural mechanisms ===
Corbetta and Shulman, who are proponents of the belief that separate neural systems exist for endogenous and exogenous control, conducted a meta-analysis of multiple studies showing brain activation due to either of the two attentional processes. Specifically, the dorsal posterior parietal and frontal cortex region are mainly implicated with voluntary attention, while activity is transiently shown in the occipital region. The endogenous mechanisms are thought to integrate previous knowledge, expectations and goals to voluntarily decide where to shift attention. On the other hand, neural areas involved in reflexive attention are believed to have the purpose of focusing attention on events or objects that stand out in the environment. The temporoparietal cortex and ventral frontal cortex region, particularly in the right brain hemisphere, have shown involvement with reflexive attention. One kind of visual inputs stands out for the primary visual cortex (V1) but not for visual awareness or for other cortical areas, they are distinctive in term of whether the left or right eye receives the inputs, e.g., an apple shown to the left eye among many other apples of the same appearance shown to the right eye. Nevertheless, such inputs, e.g., the left-eye apple, can also strongly capture attention overly and covertly (even overriding attentional guidance by endogenous goals), implicating V1 for exogenous attentional shifts according to V1 Saliency Hypothesis. Even though separate regions are thought to be in existence for these two attentional processes, the question still remains on whether these regions interact with one another, indicating more research on this point is still needed.

=== Neural overlap for voluntary and reflexive attention ===
There appears to be agreement that multiple areas of the brain are involved in shifts of attention, however research is not quite as conclusive regarding the amount of overlap evident with voluntary versus reflexive attention. Rosen et al.'s study found a fair amount of overlap between endogenous and exogenous shifts of attention. Both conditions showed activation in the dorsal and parietal premotor areas. However, the voluntary condition also showed activation in the right dorsolateral prefrontal cortex, which did not appear in the reflexive condition. As this area has been shown to be associated with working memory, it may indicate that working memory is engaged voluntarily. The subcortical global pallidus region was also activated only in the voluntary condition. Additionally, the activation shown in the temporoparietal junction [TPJ] was slightly different in both conditions, with the endogenous condition showing more spreading to the lateral, anterior and superior regions. Although these differences did exist, overall there was a lot of overlap demonstrated for voluntary and reflexive shifts of attention. Specifically both showed activations in the dorsal premotor region, the frontal eye field area, and the superior parietal cortex (SPC), although, the SPC exhibited greater activation in the endogenous condition.

Attention can be guided by top-down processing or via bottom up processing. Posner's model of attention includes a posterior attentional system involved in the disengagement of stimuli via the parietal cortex, the shifting of attention via the superior colliculus and the engagement of a new target via the pulvinar. The anterior attentional system is involved in detecting salient stimuli and preparing motor responses.

== See also ==
- Attentional control
- Attention deficit hyperactivity disorder
- Cognitive flexibility
- Executive functions
