= Barry Everitt =

Barry Everitt may refer to:

- Barry Everitt (rugby union) (born 1976), former rugby union footballer
- Barry Everitt (scientist) (born 1946), British neuroscientist
