= Neurobiology of Stress =

- Discipline: Neuroscience
- Language: English
- Edited by: R. Valentino

Publication details
- History: 2015-present
- Publisher: Elsevier
- Frequency: Biannually
- Open access: Yes
- License: CC BY

Standard abbreviations
- ISO 4: Neurobiol. Stress

Indexing
- ISSN: 2352-2895
- OCLC no.: 967864590

Links
- Journal homepage; Online archive

Neurobiology of Stress is a peer-reviewed open-access scientific journal covering research on the neurobiology of stress. It was established in 2015 and is published by Elsevier. The editor-in-chief is R. Valentino (National Institute on Drug Abuse). The journal is abstracted and indexed in the Emerging Sources Citation Index and in the past, Scopus.
