= Premotor theory of attention =

Theory in cognitive neuroscience

The premotor theory of attention is a theory in cognitive neuroscience proposing that when attention is shifted, the brain engages a motor plan to move to engage with that focus.

One line of evidence for this theory comes from neurophysiological recordings in the frontal eye fields and superior colliculus. Neurons in these areas are typically activated during eye movements, and electrical stimulation of these regions can generate eye movements. Another line of evidence comes from behavioural findings, showing that upcoming eye movements facilitate perception.
