= Dan Zahavi =

Danish philosopher (born 1967)

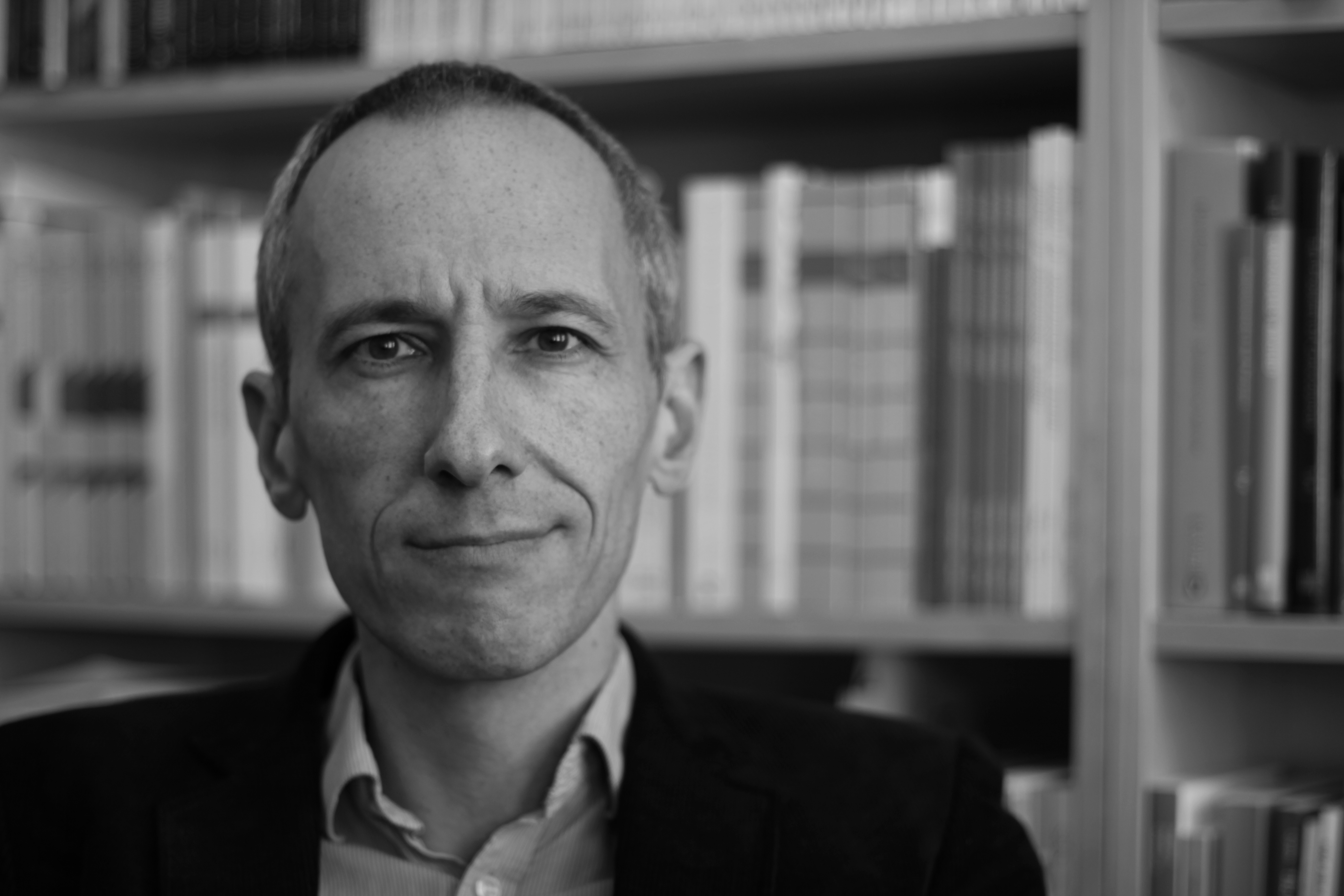
- Dan Zahavi in Copenhagen, 2014
- Born: 6 November 1967 (age 59); Copenhagen, Denmark
- Spouse: Sophie Loidolt

Education
- Education: University of Copenhagen; KU Leuven (PhD, 1994)
- Doctoral advisor: Rudolf Bernet

Philosophical work
- Era: Contemporary philosophy
- Region: Western philosophy
- School: Continental philosophy Phenomenology
- Institutions: University of Copenhagen; University of Oxford
- Main interests: Phenomenology; Husserl; philosophy of mind; philosophy of self; social ontology; sociality
- Notable ideas: Collective intentionality Coining the term "pre-reflective self-consciousness"

Dan Zahavi (born 1967) is a Danish philosopher. He is a professor of philosophy at the University of Copenhagen.

== Biography ==
Dan Zahavi was born in Copenhagen, Denmark to an Israeli father and a Danish mother. He initially studied phenomenology at the University of Copenhagen. In 1994, he obtained his PhD from Katholieke Universiteit Leuven, Belgium, with Rudolf Bernet as his doctoral supervisor. In 1999, he defended his Danish disputats (habilitation) at the University of Copenhagen. In 2002, he became professor of philosophy and director of the Center for Subjectivity Research at the University of Copenhagen. In the period 2018–21, he was also professor of philosophy at the University of Oxford. He is married to the Austrian philosopher Sophie Loidolt.

== Philosophical work ==
Zahavi writes on phenomenology (especially the philosophy of Edmund Husserl) and philosophy of mind. In his writings, he has dealt extensively with topics such as self, self-consciousness, intersubjectivity and social cognition. In the period 2007-2025 he was co-editor-in-chief of the journal Phenomenology and the Cognitive Sciences. Zahavi's work has been translated into more than 30 languages.

=== Pre-reflective self-consciousness ===
In several books and articles, Zahavi has defended the existence and significance of pre-reflective self-consciousness, and argued in favor of the idea that our experiential life is characterized by a form of self-consciousness that is more primitive and more fundamental than the reflective form of self-consciousness that one finds in various kinds of introspection. More generally speaking, Zahavi has spoken out against different reductionist approaches to consciousness, and insisted on the theoretical significance of subjectivity and the first-person perspective.

In working on these issues, Zahavi has collaborated and debated with psychiatrists, developmental psychologists, and Buddhist scholars. Critics have included those who either deny the existence of self or the existence of pre-reflective self-consciousness.

=== Empathy and social cognition ===
Another part of Zahavi's work has focused on problems related to intersubjectivity, empathy, and social cognition. His PhD thesis defended a phenomenological approach to intersubjectivity. In various papers and books since then he has in particular focused on the role and structure of empathy. He has argued in favor of the bodily and contextual character of interpersonal understanding, and criticized dominant positions within the so-called ’theory of mind’ debate, including simulation theory and theory-theory.

=== Shame and collective intentionality ===
Since 2010, Zahavi has worked increasingly on social emotions and on issues in social ontology. He has written on shame, on shared emotions, we-experiences, collective intentionality, and the importance of the I–thou relation.

=== Phenomenology ===
In parallel with his systematic work on the above-mentioned topics, Zahavi has also written on phenomenology, especially the work of Edmund Husserl. He has argued that phenomenology is a powerful and systematically convincing voice that contemporary philosophy and empirical science should not ignore. In addition to offering extensive analyses of Husserl’s analyses of intersubjectivity and self- and time-consciousness, Zahavi has also discussed the nature of Husserl’s transcendental philosophy and the metaphysical implications of phenomenology in various publications. Throughout his work, Zahavi has criticized what he takes to be overly simplistic interpretations of Husserl that depicts the latter as a solipsist and subjective idealist, and instead accentuated the continuity between Husserl’s phenomenology and the work of post-Husserlian phenomenologists, especially that of Maurice Merleau-Ponty.

== Center for Subjectivity Research ==
Zahavi is the director of the Center for Subjectivity Research (CFS), established in 2002 on the basis of funding from the Danish National Research Foundation. Since 2002, CFS has been working on topics related to selfhood and sociality and has actively promoted a research strategy involving collaboration between different philosophical tradition and between philosophy and empirical science, in particular psychiatry. After the expiration of the funding from the Danish National Research Foundation in 2012, CFS has continued its research with support from a variety of both Danish and European public and private foundations. Since 2010, CFS has organized an annual summer school in phenomenology and philosophy of mind that typically attracts around 100 students from all over the world.

== Honors and awards ==
Zahavi has received a number of honors and awards, including:

- The Edward Goodwin Ballard Prize in Phenomenology (2000)
- The Silver Medal from the Royal Danish Academy of Sciences and Letters (2000)
- Elected member of Institut International de Philosophie in 2001
- The Elite Research Prize of the Danish Ministry of Science, Technology and Innovation (2006). The award is given to outstanding young researchers of the highest international standard, which have made an extraordinary contribution to strengthen Danish research.
- Elected member of the Royal Danish Academy of Sciences and Letters in 2007
- The Carlsberg Foundation's Research Prize (2011) from the Royal Danish Academy of Sciences and Letters. The prize was awarded in connection with the 200 year anniversary of brewer J.C. Jacobsen, founder of the Carlsberg Breweries and the Carlsberg Foundation.
- The second revised edition of The Phenomenological Mind was selected by Choice as a 2012 Outstanding Academic Title.
- The Danish Association of Masters and PhDs’ Humanities Research Award (2013)
- Appointed Honorary President of The Nordic Society for Phenomenology (2014)
- Appointed Knight of the Order of the Dannebrog by the Queen of Denmark (2017)
- An Advanced Grant from the European Research Council (2019)

== Selected publications ==
Zahavi is the author of a number of books, including:

- Intentionalität und Konstitution: Eine Einführung in Husserls Logische Untersuchungen. Museum Tusculanum Press 1992.
- Husserl und die transzendentale Intersubjektivität. Kluwer Academic Publishers 1996.
- Self-awareness and Alterity. Northwestern University Press 1999.
- Husserl's Phenomenology. Stanford University Press 2003.
- Subjectivity and Selfhood: Investigating the first-person perspective. MIT Press 2005.
- Phänomenologie für Einsteiger. Wilhelm Fink Verlag 2007.
- The Phenomenological Mind (with Shaun Gallagher). Routledge 2008/2012/2021.
- Self and Other: Exploring Subjectivity, Empathy, and Shame. Oxford University Press 2014.
- Husserl's Legacy: Phenomenology, Metaphysics, and Transcendental Philosophy. Oxford University Press 2017.
- Phenomenology: The Basics. Routledge 2019/2025.
- Being We: Phenomenological Contributions to Social Ontology. Oxford University Press 2025.

Zahavi is also the editor of more than 10 volumes, including:

- The Oxford Handbook of Contemporary Phenomenology. Oxford University Press 2012.
- Husserl's legacy : phenomenology, metaphysics, and transcendental philosophy. Oxford University Press 2017.
- The Oxford Handbook of the History of Phenomenology. Oxford University Press 2018.
