= Alan Schatzberg =

Alan F. Schatzberg is an American psychiatrist. He was the 136th president of the American Psychiatric Association (2009–2010).

Since 1991, he has been the Kenneth T. Norris Jr. Professor of Psychiatry and Behavioral Sciences at Stanford University School of Medicine, and he was chair of the department from 1991 to 2010. He has received multiple national and international awards for his work as an investigator in the biology and treatment of depression. He is also the co-editor-in-chief of the Journal of Psychiatric Research, along with Florian Holsboer. He received an honorary doctorate from the Medical University of Vienna in 2011.

As the APA president in 2009–10, he was identified as the principal investigator on a federal study into the drug mifepristone for use as an antidepressant being developed by Corcept Therapeutics, a company Schatzberg had created and in which he had several million dollars' equity.
