= Agency (psychology) =

Ability to initiate and control actions

In psychology, agency is a person's ability to initiate and control their actions, and the feeling they have of being in charge of their actions. The topic of agency can be divided into two topical domains. The first half of the topic of agency deals with the behavioral sense, or outwardly expressive evidence thereof. The other half of the topic of agency deals with the arguments of determinism.

In behavioral psychology, agents are goal-directed entities that can monitor their environment to select and perform efficient means-end actions that are available in a given situation to achieve an intended goal. Behavioral agency, therefore, implies the ability to perceive and change the environment of the agent. Crucially, it also entails intentionality to represent the goal state in the future, equifinal variability to be able to achieve the intended goal state with different actions in different contexts, and rationality of actions in relation to their goal to produce the most efficient action available. Cognitive scientists and Behavioral psychologists have thoroughly investigated agency attribution in humans and non-human animals since social cognitive mechanisms such as communication, social learning, imitation, or theory of mind presuppose the ability to identify agents and differentiate them from inanimate, non-agentive objects. This ability has also been assumed to have a major effect on the inferential and predictive processes of the observers of agents because agentive entities are expected to perform autonomous behavior based on their current and previous knowledge and intentions. On the other hand, inanimate objects are supposed to react to external physical forces.

Although the concepts are often confused with one another, sensitivity to agency and the sense of agency are distinct and separate concepts. The sensitivity to agency can be explained as a cognitive ability to identify agentive entities in the environment, while the sense of agency refers to the feeling of having control over decisions and actions. In other contexts of psychology, the sense of agency is discussed in its relation to self-efficacy, which is an individual's learned belief of how able they are to succeed in specific situations.

Discussion of agency and determinism is typically found in theories of personality and developmental lifespan. This determinism differs from philosophical determinism as it encapsulates forms of deterministic principles found within these psychological theories, such as hedonism, developmental stage theory, the law of non-contradiction, consistency, necessity, and others. Capitalizing on the first half of agency, these principles of determinism are founded on the test-retest/empirical evidence of observable behavior. Founding actors of Psychology (such as Sigmund Freud, and B.F. Skinner) defaulted on deterministic principles in order to form their theories. Much of this is due to the scientific consensus of the era, particularly concerning Newtonian principles of linear time and the attempts made by earlier psychologists to have psychology recognized as a serious science.

== Theoretical approaches of agency ==
Carey and Spelke's model of domain-specific cognition explained certain perceptual and representational abilities vital to how humans recognize other humans. They attempted to answer the question of how humans understand "the notion that people are sentient beings who choose their actions". They identified that even infants appear to be born with the ability to recognize human facial features but noted that there is a body of research that has decently refuted the idea that babies use facial representations "to identify people as entities expected to be capable of perceptions and purposive action". Instead, Carey and Spelke suggested that humans identify other sentient beings through observation of the actions those beings perform instead of identifying them by their appearances.

According to Carey and Spelke, the cognitive models explaining specific perceptual and representational abilities, for instance, the models of agency recognition, can be separated into two different classes: feature-based models and principle-based approaches.

The feature-based models of agency assume that the perception of an observer focuses on featural and behavioral cues that help to identify agents. Previous studies show that even very young human observers are sensitive to

- self-propulsion,
- non-rigid transformation of the object's surface,
- irregular path movement,
- causation at a distance,
- contingent turn-taking reactivity.

However, none of these cues alone are necessary or sufficient to identify an agent, since unfamiliar, novel entities like animated figures or robots without human features can elicit agency attribution in humans. Therefore, cognitive models belonging to the principle-based approaches were designed to describe how humans perceive agency assuming that the detection of agency is not a precondition, but a consequence of inferential processes about potentially agentive objects.

The theory of teleological stance proposes that from 12 months of age, humans can apply the principle of rational action to determine whether the observed entity is an agent or an inanimate object depending on an agent's rational behavior for its own functioning. The theory assumes that the rationality principle makes observers able to relate the action, the represented goal state, and the current situational constraints to decide whether an object is an agent. For instance, if infants had learned that an abstract, unfamiliar agent (an animated circle on a display) approaches another entity by jumping over an obstacle, when the obstacle had been removed, they expected a new, but highly rational behavior from the agent to approach the other entity via a straight pathway. In contrast, when infants were shown that the unfamiliar entity always made a detour when approaching its goal object exhibiting the non-justifiable behavior of jumping in the absence of an obstacle, they did not expect rational behavior when the situational constraints changed.

These results and later empirical studies underpinned that agency recognition in humans can be explained by principle-based models rather than simple perceptual cues. As Gergely and Csibra concluded, from 12 months of age humans "can take the teleological stance to interpret actions as means to goals, can evaluate the relative efficiency of means by applying the principle of rational action, and can generate systematic inferences to identify relevant aspects of the situation to justify the action as an efficient means even when these aspects are not directly visible to them".

== Types of agents ==
It was proposed that the representation of agency can be based on the sensitivity to different abilities observed in agentive entities probably in humans and perhaps in non-human species as well. In humans, the species-specific social environment allows one to identify agents either based on their intentional behavior, on their non-communicative, rational, goal-directed actions, or by recognizing their communicative abilities. Agents identified by their intentional behaviors and goal-directed actions are considered instrumental agents, while agents identified by an action's communicative properties are considered communicative agents. In non-human species, however, besides these types of input information, unfamiliar potential agents can be identified based on their perceptual abilities. These have context-dependent effects on the behavior of the non-human observer even in the absence of a visible goal object that may be required to assess the effectiveness of their goal approach.

=== Instrumental agency ===
According to Gergely, instrumental agents are intentional agents that exhibit actions in order to realize their goal states in the environment. The recognition of instrumental agents has been investigated by numerous experiments in human infants, and also in non-human apes. These studies reveal that when an agent exhibits an instrumental action it is expected by human infants to achieve its goal in an efficient manner, which is rational in terms of efforts in a given context.

On the other hand, it is also expected by infants that an agent should have a clear goal state to be achieved. Gergely said, "Before the end of their first year, infants can track others' subjective motivations." This suggests that infants understand that humans and other potential agents act in order to achieve some goal whether the goal is seen or unseen. Gergely went on to postulate that infants judge potentially instrumental actions based on how efficiently that action seems to help propel the potential agent towards forward progress in the goal.

In practice, instrumental agency seems to fluctuate with various conditions, or at least the ability to exercise instrumental agency does. One of these conditions appears to be political/social, indicating that lower access to food or undernutrition has a bidirectional influence on women's agency in East African countries.

=== Communicative agency ===
In contrast to instrumental agents, communicative agents are intentional agents whose actions are performed to bring about a specific change in the mental representations of the addressee, for instance by providing new and relevant information. The recognition of communicative agency may allow the observer to predict that communicative information transfer can have a relevant effect on the behavior of the agent, even if the interacting agents and their communicative signals are unfamiliar. Because all communicative agents are, definitionally, intentional agents as well, communicative agents are assumed to be a subset of intentional agents; however, not all intentional agents need to possess communicative capabilities. The idea here is that one's intentionality is what a communicative agent would be communicating to others, thus signifying that the agent is performing actions that act in some ways as a means to an end.

Catt connected communication and intentionality in this way, "Communication is that possibility of experiencing consciousness in which phenomenological intentionality is simultaneously realized and actualized. The abductive result is agency, the distinctive human capacity to illuminate meaning in the embodiment of semiosis." By this one can understand that in many ways an agent's ability to communicate is fundamental to their agentive nature, and intentionality is a key component of what a communicative agent communicates. Additionally, an intentional agent's intentions are at least partially achieved through communication.

Communicative agency is also viewed as the rationale behind social and relational communications and shared activities. It is considered "fundamentally interpretive and relational." Games, especially games with a narrative nature, play with one's definitions and conceptions of communicative agency and strengthen one's communicative abilities and relationships. Spracklen and Spracklen investigated social bonding over "dark leisure", including goth musical culture, and they reasoned that creating bonds with others over dark culture is a method of commiserating over shared struggles. Additionally, they argued that dark culture of such a nature is a means to reducing cognitive dissonance between the ideals of what society could be and the state of society in reality.

=== Navigational agency ===
The construal of navigational agency is based on the assumption that Leslie's theory on agency implies two different types of distal sensitivity; distal sensitivity in space and distal sensitivity in time. While goal-directed instrumental agents need both of these abilities to represent a goal-state in the future and achieve it in a rational and efficient manner, navigational agents are supposed to have only perceptual abilities, that is a distal sensitivity in space to avoid collision with objects in their environments. A study contrasting the ability of dogs and human infants to attribute agency to unfamiliar self-propelled objects showed that dogs – unlike human infants – may lack the capability to recognize instrumental agents, however, they can identify navigational agents.

== Agency recognition in non-human animals ==
The ability to represent the efficiency of goal-directed actions of an instrumental agent may be a phylogenetically ancient core cognitive mechanism that can be found in non-human primates as well. Previous research provided evidence for this assumption, showing that this sensitivity affects the expectations of cotton-top tamarins, rhesus macaques, and chimpanzees. Non-human apes are able to make inferences about the goal of an instrumental agent by taking into account the environmental constraints that can guide the agent's actions. Moreover, it seems that non-human species like dogs can recognize contingent reactivity as an abstract cue of agency, and respond to contingent agents in a manner that is significantly different to how they respond to inanimate objects.

== See also ==
- Agency (philosophy)
- Intelligent agent
- Embodied agent
- Cybernetics
- Self-efficacy
- Sense of agency
- Self-agency
