= Journal of Psychiatric Research =

- Discipline: Psychiatry
- Language: English
- Edited by: Florian Holsboer, Alan Schatzberg

Publication details
- History: 1961-present
- Publisher: Elsevier
- Frequency: Monthly
- Impact factor: 4.465 (2015)

Standard abbreviations
- ISO 4: J. Psychiatr. Res.

Indexing
- CODEN: JPYRA3
- ISSN: 0022-3956
- LCCN: 65008344
- OCLC no.: 1754759

Links
- Journal homepage; Online access; Online archive

The Journal of Psychiatric Research is a monthly peer-reviewed medical journal covering research in four major areas of psychiatry: clinical studies on normal and pathological human behavior; basic studies in psychiatry and related fields; clinical laboratory techniques such as neuroimaging, spectroscopy and other computer techniques used in research; advances in research methodology, including the clinical use of recent research findings. The journal was established in 1961 and is published by Elsevier. The current editor-in-chief is Eric Hollander (Albert Einstein College of Medicine). According to the Journal Citation Reports, the journal has a 2015 impact factor of 4.465.
