= Sense of ownership =

Psychological phenomena

Sense of ownership (SoO), in psychology, is the feeling of identifying sensations (both internal and external) as affecting, establishing, and belonging to one's identified-self. and is the pre-reflective awareness or implicit sense that one is the owner of an action, movement or thought.

In non-pathological experience, the SoO is tightly integrated with one's "sense of agency" (SoA).

At least three different types of bodily self-experiences can be experimentally identified as separable processes: self-identification (i.e. ownership of one's bodily sensations), self-location (i.e., the experience of self situated in a specific space), and first person-perspective (i.e., the loci of experiencing and perceiving reality).

== Self-identification ==
Evidence for self-identification of body-ownership comes from cases of Body integrity dysphoria (BID) where affected individuals feel 'alienation' or over-completeness over parts of their body, and somatoparaphrenia where affected individuals' deny ownership to a part or to an entire section (i.e. unilateral neglect) of their body. Research from Dilk, M.T. (2013) show associated brain areas (with decreased activity) of the premotor cortex with non-identification of body parts (in patients who exhibit BID).

== Self-location ==
There is a large body of evidence suggesting the Temporoparietal junction (TPJ) influences body location: evidence comes from brain stimulation at the TPJ and associated out of body experiences.

== See also ==
- Body schema
- Extrastriate body area
- Neural basis of self
