= Agency (philosophy) =

Capacity of an actor to act in a given environment

Agency is the capacity of an actor to act in a given environment. In some contexts, the exercise of agency is linked to questions of moral responsibility, and may pertain to questions of moral agency.

Agency may either be classified as unconscious, involuntary behavior, or purposeful, goal directed activity (intentional action). An agent typically has some sort of immediate awareness of their physical activity and the goals that the activity is aimed at realizing. In 'goal directed action' an agent implements a kind of direct control or guidance over their own behavior.

== Human agency ==
Human agency entails the claim that humans make decisions and enact them in the world, independent of whether it is deterministically or through free will. This is in contrast with objects reacting to natural forces, devoid of any thinking capacity. In this respect, agency does not necessitate free will.

=== In philosophy ===
The philosophical discipline in charge of studying agency is action theory. In certain philosophical traditions (particularly those established by Hegel and Marx), human agency is a collective, historical dynamic, rather than a function arising out of individual behavior. Hegel's Geist and Marx's universal class are idealist and materialist expressions of this idea of humans treated as social beings, organized to act in concert. There is an ongoing debate, philosophically derived in part from the works of Hume, between determinism and indeterminacy.

Structure and agency form an enduring core debate in sociology. Essentially the same as in the Marxist conception, "agency" refers to the capacity of individuals to act independently and to make their own free choices, based on their will, whereas "structure" refers to those factors (such as social class, but also religion, gender, ethnicity, subculture, etc.) that seem to limit or influence the opportunities that individuals have.

=== In sociology ===
Within sociology, agency occurs when an agent engages with the social structure. The primacy of the social structure vs. individual capacity regarding an agent's actions is debated within sociology. This debate includes influence of reflexivity on an agent's actions.

=== In economics ===
Economics stresses the purposive action of economic agents, who act to advance their subjective well-being given fundamental constraints. Thus, economic models typically begin with "an agent" maximizing some objective. In contract theory, economics also addresses the problem of agents who represent another party (the principal) potentially unfaithfully.

=== In psychology ===
The term agency is used in different fields of psychology with different meanings. It can refer to the ability of recognizing agents or attributing agency to objects based on simple perceptual cues or principles, for instance the principle of rationality, which holds that context-sensitive, goal-directed efficient actions are the crucial characteristics of agents. This topic is thoroughly investigated by developmental to understand how an observer is able to differentiate agentive entities from inanimate objects, but it can also be related to the term of autonomous intelligent agency used in cybernetics. Agency can also imply the sense of agency, that is the feeling of ownership or control.

Emergent interactive agency defines Bandura's view of agencies, where human agency can be exercised through direct personal agency. Bandura formulates his view of agency as a socio-cognitive one, where people are self-organizing, proactive, self-regulating, and engage in self-reflection, and are not just reactive organisms shaped and shepherded by external events. People have the power to influence their own actions to produce certain results. The capacity to exercise control over one’s thought processes, motivation, affect, and action operates through mechanisms of personal agency. Such agencies are emergent and interactive, apply perspectives of social cognition, and make causal contributions to their own motivations and actions using ‘reciprocal causation’.

=== In social cybernetics ===
Autonomous agency is able to embrace the concepts of both the economic agency and the emergent interactive agency. An autonomous system is self-directed, operating in, and being influenced by, interactive environments. It usually has its own inherent dynamics that impact the way it interacts. It is also adaptable and (hence viable thus having a durable existence), proactive, self-organizing, self-regulating and so forth, participates in creating its own behavior, and contributes to its life circumstances through cognitive and cultural functionality. Autonomous agency may also be concerned with the relationship between two or more agencies in a mutual relationship with each other and their environments, with imperatives for an agency's behavior within an interactive context due to immanent emergent attributes.

=== In political economy ===
Human agency refers to the ability to shape one’s life and a few dimensions can be differentiated. Individual agency is reflected in individual choices and the ability to influence one’s life conditions and chances. The individual agency differs strongly within society across age, gender, income, education, personal health status, position in social networks, and other dimensions. Collective agency refers to situations in which individuals pool their knowledge, skills, and resources and act in concert to shape their future. Everyday agency refers to consumer and daily choices, and finally strategic agency refers to the capacity to affect the wider system change. Political economy approaches can be used to conceptualize the agency enabling or limiting rule system, which constitutes the “grammar” for social action and that is used by the actors to structure and regulate their transactions with one another in defined situations or spheres of activity.

== See also ==
- Action theory (philosophy)
- Actor–network theory
- Agent-based modeling
- Agency (sociology)
- Agency (psychology)
- Sense of agency
- Collective intentionality
- Collective intelligence
- Corporate personhood
- Intentionality
- Cognition
- Free will
- Nature and nurture
- Social action
- True Will
