= Biological motion =

Motion that comes from actions of a biological organism

An example of a point light display of an American Sign Language sentence. The biological motions of the signer can be observed through the motions of white dots, as they sign a sentence.

Biological motion is motion that comes from actions of a biological organism. Humans and animals are able to understand those actions through experience, identification, and higher level neural processing. Humans use biological motion to identify and understand familiar actions, which is involved in the neural processes for empathy, communication, and understanding other's intentions. The neural network for biological motion is highly sensitive to the observer's prior experience with the action's biological motions, allowing for embodied learning. This is related to a research field that is broadly known as embodied cognitive science, along with research on mirror neurons.

For instance, a well known example of sensitiveness to a specific type of biological motion is expert dancers observing others dancing. Compared to people who do not know how to dance, expert dancers show more sensitiveness to the biological motion from the dance style of their expertise. The same expert dancer would also show similar but less sensitivity to dance styles outside of their expertise. The differences in perception of dance motions suggests that the ability to perceive and understand biological motion is strongly influenced by the observer's experience with the action. A similar expertise effect has been observed in different types of action, such as music making, language, scientific thinking, basketball, and walking.

== History ==
The phenomenon of human sensitivity to biological motion was first documented by Swedish perceptual psychologist, Gunnar Johansson, in 1973. He is best known for his experiments that used point light displays (PLDs). Johansson attached light bulbs to body parts and joints of actors performing various actions in the dark. He filmed these actions, yielding point lights from each bulb moving on a black background. Johansson found that people were able to recognize what the actors were doing when the PLD was moving, but not when it was stationary. Johansson's invention of PLDs inspired a new field of research into human perception. Modern technology to make PLDs involves the same principles, except that film has been replaced by multiple cameras attached to computers that construct a 3D representation of actors' movements, allowing for considerable control of the PLDs.

Interest in biological motion was renewed with the publication of a 1996 article on mirror neurons. Mirror neurons were found to be active in an animal's brain both when that animal observed another animal making a movement and when that animal made the same movement. The mirror neurons were initially observed in the premotor cortex, however they were also found in supramarginal gyrus and temporoparietal junction, areas of the brain that is associated with biological motion processing. The coding of both visual and motor actions within same set of neurons suggests that biological motion understanding and perception is influenced by not only the visual information of the motion but also by the observer's experience with the biological motion.

Today, the discovery of mirror neurons has led to an explosion of research on biological motion and action perception and understanding in research fields such as social and affective neuroscience, language, action, motion capture technology, and artificial intelligence such as androids and virtual embodied agents, and the uncanny valley phenomenon.

== Research on Biological Motion ==
Findings from research on biological motion has shown that humans are highly sensitive to biological motions of actions and those observations has developed into studies on different possible factors in the perception and understanding of the biological motions of bodily actions. Through studies with point-light display (PLD), findings in psychology and neuroscience fields has grown into a sizable body of research that stretches across different fields.

=== General Observations on Biological Motion ===
In a PLD experiment, participants are presented with a static, dynamic, or randomized dynamic white dots that consists of light sources or motion capture markers that were placed on the joints that are involved in actions for biological organisms. Even though individual dots in PLD do not show any overt visual connection with other dots, observers are able to perceive cohesive biological motion of actions in dynamic PLD.^{[4]} Studies using PLD methods have found that people are better at identifying PLD of their own gaits compared to others.^{[3]} People are also able to recognize different emotions in PLD. With special attention to body language, an observer can identify anger, sadness, and happiness. Observers can also identify the actors' gender with some actions in PLD.

=== Lesion Damage ===
In a large study with stroke patients, significant regions found to be associated with deficient biological motion perception include the superior temporal sulcus and premotor cortex. The cerebellum also is involved in biological motion processing.

A recent study on a patient with developmental agnosia, an impairment in recognizing objects, found that the ability to recognize the form of biological organisms through biological motion remains intact, despite deficiency in perception of non-biological form through motion. Another study with several groups of brain-damaged patients found that perception of biological motion is not dependent on the ventral form visual pathway.

=== Neuroimaging ===
Recent cognitive neuroscience research has begun to focus on the brain structures and neural networks that are involved in biological motion processing. The use of transcranial magnetic stimulation methods provided with evidence that suggests that biological motion processing occurs outside of the MT+/V5 area, which can include both visual form and motion. The posterior superior temporal sulcus has been shown to be active during biological motion perception. Also, premotor cortex has been shown to be active during biological motion processing, showing that the mirror neuron system is recruited for perception and understanding of PLD. Further evidence from another study shows that the default mode network is essential in distinguishing between biological and non-biological motion. Such findings aforementioned studies show that biological motion perception is a process that pulls in several different neural systems outside of networks involved in the visual processing of non-biological motions and objects.

=== Development in Children ===
The human perception and understanding of biological motion in animal actions develops with age, usually capping at approximately five years of age. In an experiment, with three-year-old, four-year-old, and five-year-old children and adults, participants were asked to identify PLD of animals actions such as walking human, running and walking dog, and flying bird. Results showed that adults and five-year-olds were able to accurately identify animal actions. However four-year-olds and three-year-olds struggled, although four-year-olds were significantly better at identifying animal actions than three-year-olds. This suggests that our perception and understanding of biological motion and actions goes through developmental process in human children, arriving at a performance ceiling for identifying animal actions at five years.

While most animals, for example cats, tend to recognize their own species' point-light displays over others species and scrambled PLDs, the three-year-olds had the most success at identifying a walking dog PLD and had the least success with a walking human PLD. A possible explanation of this contradictory results might be because of the children's small physical stature and their resulting experiences with visual perspectives: dogs are closer in height to smaller kids, while the experience of observing and performing similar biological motions of walking human are harder to come by due to height of adults, along with their low amount of experience with walking.

In the next part of the experiment, different participants were asked to identify the same point-light display animals but with static images instead of moving dots. Five-year-olds and adults gave results of chance performance, while the younger participants were omitted due to the higher error rates from the harder nature of the task. Therefore, this experiment suggests that at five years old, we are adept at identifying animal actions and visual forms with point-light displays. This study also shows that experience with biological motion is critical for our perception and understanding of actions.

=== Language ===
Humans seem to use similar cognitive functions in identifying real verbs and biologically possible motions. In another experiment, researchers gave participants a lexical and action decision tasks to measure how long it took them to identify whether the words were real or the scrambled PLDs an action. Participants took much longer to identify pseudo words and scrambled PLDs. The correlation in reaction time between verb words and PLD actions was found to be rather strong (r= 0.56), while the correlation between nouns and PLD actions was much lower (r= 0.31).

Those findings suggest that humans use similar cognitive functions to identify biological motion and words, whether it is presented through written language or point-light displays. The researcher suggests that these findings supports a theoretical framework called embodied cognition, which suggests that the cognition of actions and words can be supported by the motor system.

=== Psychophysics ===
Some research looks into the differences between global and local processing of biological motion; how the whole PLD figure is processed compared to how individual dots in the PLD are processed. One study investigated both types of processing in a PLD of human walking in different directions by replacing individual dots with human images or stick figures facing in different directions. The results showed that the humans struggle to perceive the walking direction of the global PLD when the local dots does not face in the same direction, indicating that the brain uses a similar form-based mechanism for the recognition of both global and local stimuli during processing. The results also show that processing local images is an automatic process that can interfere with the subsequent processing of the global form of the walking PLD.

Perception of biological motion in PLD depends both on the motions of individual dots and the configuration/orientation of the body as a whole, as well as interactions between these local and global cues. Similar to the Thatcher Effect in face perception, inversion of individual points is easy to detect when the entire figure is presented normally, but difficult to detect when the entire display is presented upside-down. However, recent electrophysiological work suggest that the configuration/orientation of the PLD might influence the processing PLD's motion, in the early stages of neural processing.

== See also ==
- Biological motion perception
- Motion perception
- Theory of mind
- Mirror neurons
- Motor Cognition
- Uncanny Valley
- Cognitive neuroscience
- Embodied Cognitive Science
- Embodied cognition
- Empathy
- Social neuroscience
- Affective neuroscience
- Temporoparietal junction
- Premotor cortex
- Common coding theory
- Language processing in the brain
- Motion capture
