= Benazir Salam =

Indian classical dancer from Bangladesh (born 1979)

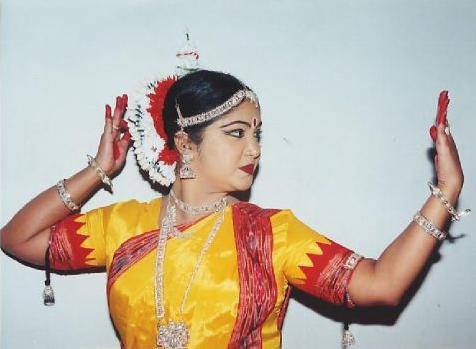
- Born: 17 January 1979 (age 47); Rajshahi, Bangladesh
- Other name: Sumi
- Occupations: Dancer, dance teacher
- Years active: 1983 – present
- Spouse: Dewan Abdullah Zaman (m. 1996)
- Parent(s): Md. Abdus Salam; Kohinoor Salam

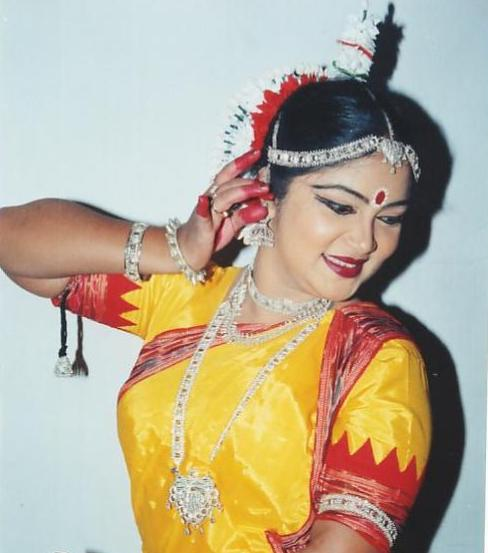
Benazir Salam

Benazir Salam (born 17 January 1979) is an Indian classical dancer from Bangladesh.

== Career ==
Benazir is the daughter of Md. Abdus Salam and Kohinoor Salam. She began her dance career at the dance school of Abdul Hasib Panna called Nikkon Shilpi Goshthi in 1983 in Rajshahi, Bangladesh. She was considered the national child of the years 1986, 1988 and 1989 through a competition organized by the Shishu Academy of Bangladesh. In those competitions she performed Kathak, Bharatanatyam, modern dance and folk dance. She was awarded gold medals in Manipuri dance, Modern Dance and Katthak Dance in Dhaka Junior Art and Music Festival 1988, sponsored by British Council and ANZ Grindlays Bank. She won the first Prize in Classical Dance (Katthak) in the National Education Week, Dhaka, Bangladesh in 1990. She also won UNESCO Clubs Cultural Award, Bangladesh in the same year.

She received a scholarship from the Indian Council for Cultural Relations (ICCR) for her undergraduate (honors) degree in Odissi from Rabindra Bharati University between 1996 and 1999. She secured the first position among her class and received the university gold medal. Benazir subsequently completed her master's degree in Odissi dance from the university securing the first position and the gold medal. During her stay at the university, she was a disciple of renowned dancer Muralidhar Majhi and Poushali Mukherjee.

Currently she teaches Odissi dance at her own school in Bangladesh, Nupur. She also is a dance teacher at Bangladesh Shishu Academy in Dhaka.
