= Arthy Ahmed =

Bangladeshi dancer

- অর্থী আহমেদ
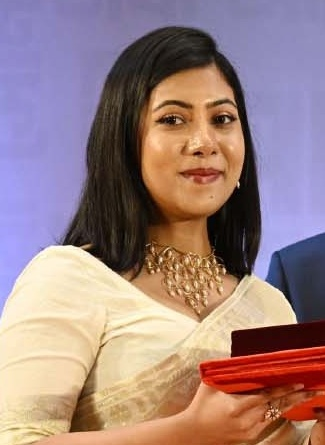
- Arthy in 2026
- Education: Rabindra Bharati University; University of Madras
- Awards: Ekushey Padak

Arthy Ahmed is a Bangladeshi Bharatnatyam dancer, dance teacher and activist. Her academy, the Arthy Ahmed Dance Academy in Dhaka, is best known for its adult dance classes and community productions. She uses Indian classical dance to tackle contemporary issues such as sexism, misogyny and loss of cultural heritage.

Ahmed was awarded Ekushey Padak, the second highest civilian award, by the government of Bangladesh in 2026.

== Early life and career ==
Ahmed started dancing at the age of three. After receiving a scholarship from the Indian Council for Cultural Relations, she gained a BA and MA in Bharatnatyam from Rabindra Bharati University. She also has a Teacher's Training Diploma in dance education from Madras University, majoring in dance psychology.

Ahmed's earliest students were children, but during the 2020 Covid pandemic she started classes for adult beginners. Starting with 25 students, today she has 600. She says her instruction focuses on emotional healing through dance:

People come in hating their bodies, doubting themselves, thinking they're too late. But over time, they start shedding that. Some have come out of depression, insecurity, and anxiety. It's not just about learning to dance. It's about learning to feel alive again.

Ahmed's 2023 production Sakhi featured 90 women dancers. Ghonoghota, held at the Faculty of Fine Arts, University of Dhaka in August 2025, was a monsoon-themed production drawing on the works of Rabindranath Tagore. Navapallava 2, her academy's November 2025 recital showcase, took place at the headquarters of the Bangladesh Girl Guides Association.
