= Rabindra Bharati University =

Public university in Kolkata, India

- Motto: aṣṭadāṁ prāntabhūmiḥ prajñā
- Motto in English: Wisdom is the frontier of all eight directions
- Type: Public State University
- Established: 8 May 1962 (64 years ago)
- Accreditation: NAAC
- Academic affiliations: UGC; AIU
- Budget: ₹84.3 crore (US$8.8 million) (2025–26)
- Chancellor: Governor of West Bengal
- Vice-Chancellor: Vacant
- Academic staff: 158 (2025)
- Students: 5,624 (2025)
- Undergraduates: 2,252 (2025)
- Postgraduates: 3,003 (2025)
- Doctoral students: 369 (2025)
- Location: Kolkata, West Bengal, India; 22°35′04″N 88°21′34″E
- Campus: Urban 22.19 acres (8.98 ha)
- Website: www.rbu.ac.in

Rabindra Bharati University is a public research university in Kolkata, India. It was founded on 8 May 1962, under the Rabindra Bharati Act of the Government of West Bengal in 1961, to mark the birth centenary of the poet Rabindranath Tagore. It is located at the Tagore family home, Jorasanko Thakur Bari. The university offers undergraduate and postgraduate programmes in Performing Arts and Visual Arts under the Faculty of Fine Arts, Humanities, Social Sciences and other subjects under the Faculty of Arts.

Currently, the post of Vice-Chancellor of the university is vacant.

== Tagore museum ==
The Jorasanko Thakur Bari is the ancestral home of the Tagore family. The first non-European Nobel laureate Rabindranath Tagore was born here.

== Notable Students ==
=== Researcher ===
- Methil Devika, Indian Classical Dancer and Senior Research associate at ISRO

=== Academic ===
- John Felix Raj, Indian Professor and Principal.

=== Dance ===
- Chitresh Das, Indian Classical Dancer.
- Benazir Salam, Indian classical Dancer from Bangladesh
- Arthy Ahmed, Recipient of the Ekushey Padak from Bangladesh

=== Painter ===
- Subhaprasanna, Indian Painter.

=== Musicians ===
- Anup Ghoshal, Indian Playback singer.
- Ajoy Chakrabarty, Indian Vocalist, Composer and Lyricist.
- Banani Ghosh, Indian Vocalist
- Madhushree, Indian Playback Singer.
- Priyanka Gope, Bangladeshi Playback Singer.
- Swagatalakshmi Dasgupta, Indian Vocalist.
- Shanti Thatal, Indian Nepali Languages Music Composer and Playback Singer.
- Subhamita Banerjee, Indian Vocalist, Composer and Lyricist.

=== Writer ===
- Moniruddin Khan, Indian Writer and essayist.
- Kalipada Soren, Santhali playwright, author and editor.

=== Film ===
- Anirban Bhattacharya, Indian Actor, singer, Screenplay Writer, Filmmaker.
- Aparajita Ghosh Das, Indian Actress.
- Basabdatta Chatterjee, Indian Actress.
- Darshana Banik, Indian Model and Actress.
- Shirin Guha, Indian actress.
- Tathagata Mukherjee, Indian Actor and Filmmaker.
- Wahida Mollick Jolly, Bangladeshi Actress.

=== Others ===
- Deepa Dasmunsi, former Member of Parliament for West Bengal and President of the Delhi Women Football association.
- Suvendu Adhikari, 9th Chief Minister of West Bengal.

== Notable faculty ==
- Manoj Mitra

== See also ==
- Department of Instrumental Music, Rabindra Bharati University
- List of universities in India
