= Great Portland Estates =

British property company

Great Portland Estates plc
- Type: Public
- Traded as: LSE: GPE; FTSE 250 component
- Industry: Property
- Founded: 1959
- Headquarters: London, England
- Key people: Richard Mully (Chairman); Toby Courtauld (CEO)
- Revenue: ▲£117.9 million (2026)
- Operating income: ▲£157.4 million (2026)
- Net income: ▲£154.5 million (2026)
- Website: www.gpe.co.uk

Great Portland Estates plc (branded as GPE) is a British property development and investment company. It is listed on the London Stock Exchange and is a constituent of the FTSE 250 Index. The firm switched to Real Estate Investment Trust status when REITs were introduced in the United Kingdom in January 2007.

== History ==
GPE was founded by Howard and Basil Samuel in 1959 to invest in properties originally developed by the Dukes of Portland. It was listed on the London Stock Exchange later that year. It acquired the Ilex Estate in 1997. In 2007 the company converted into a real estate investment trust.

In April 2018 it was announced that KKR would be taking up 57,000 square feet of space in GPE's new office development in Hanover Square. The move was the biggest single deal in Mayfair for a decade.

Great Portland Estates was rebranded to GPE in November 2021.

== Operations ==
GPE is based in London and the great majority of its assets are in London. It mainly owns office buildings, with a smaller amount of retail property. The largest group of properties is in the Marylebone district of Central London just to the north of Oxford Street, in and around Great Portland Street. The company also owns properties in the West End, such as the West side of Hanover Square, and in the City of London, such as the former Bloomberg headquarters.

As of 31 March 2026, Great Portland Estates' property portfolio was valued at circa £2.5 billion.

== See also ==
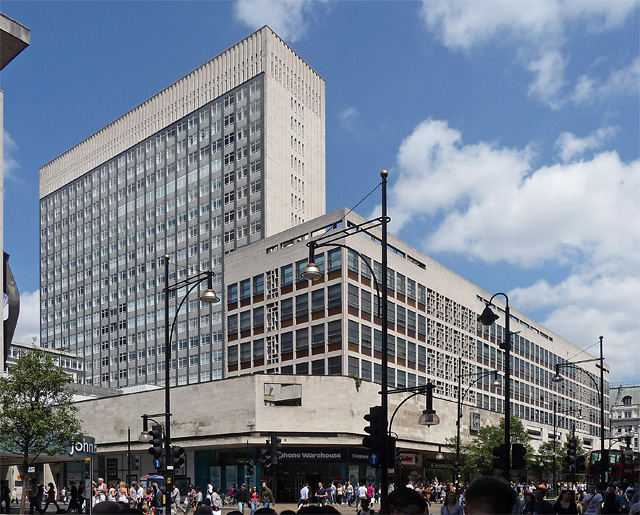
Head office at Cavendish Square, London (the tall building on the left)

- Minerva House
- 100 Bishopsgate
