= Twigg Brown Architects =

British architectural firm

Twigg Brown are a London-based architecture practice. Their notable projects include the Hay's Galleria as part of the overall Twigg Brown masterplan for London Bridge City and the Grosvenor Waterside development in Chelsea for Grosvenor.

== Competitions & Awards ==
- Evening Standard Housing Award for the St John's redevelopment as housing of a former nurses accommodation block of Westminster Hospital
- Commercial Award for Waterside Developments by Jackson-Stops & Staff and Estates Gazette for London Bridge City
- Civic Trust Award and British Constructional Steelwork Association's Structural Steel Design Award, for Hay's Galleria

== Publications ==
- “'City Reborn': Architecture and Regeneration in London from Bankside to Dulwich”; Merrell Publishers (Oct 2004)
- “Live the High Life in Basingstoke”; Basingstoke Observer (May 2003)

== See also ==
- Minerva House
