= Hay's Galleria =

Building in London, England

Coordinates: 51.5058°N 0.0837°W

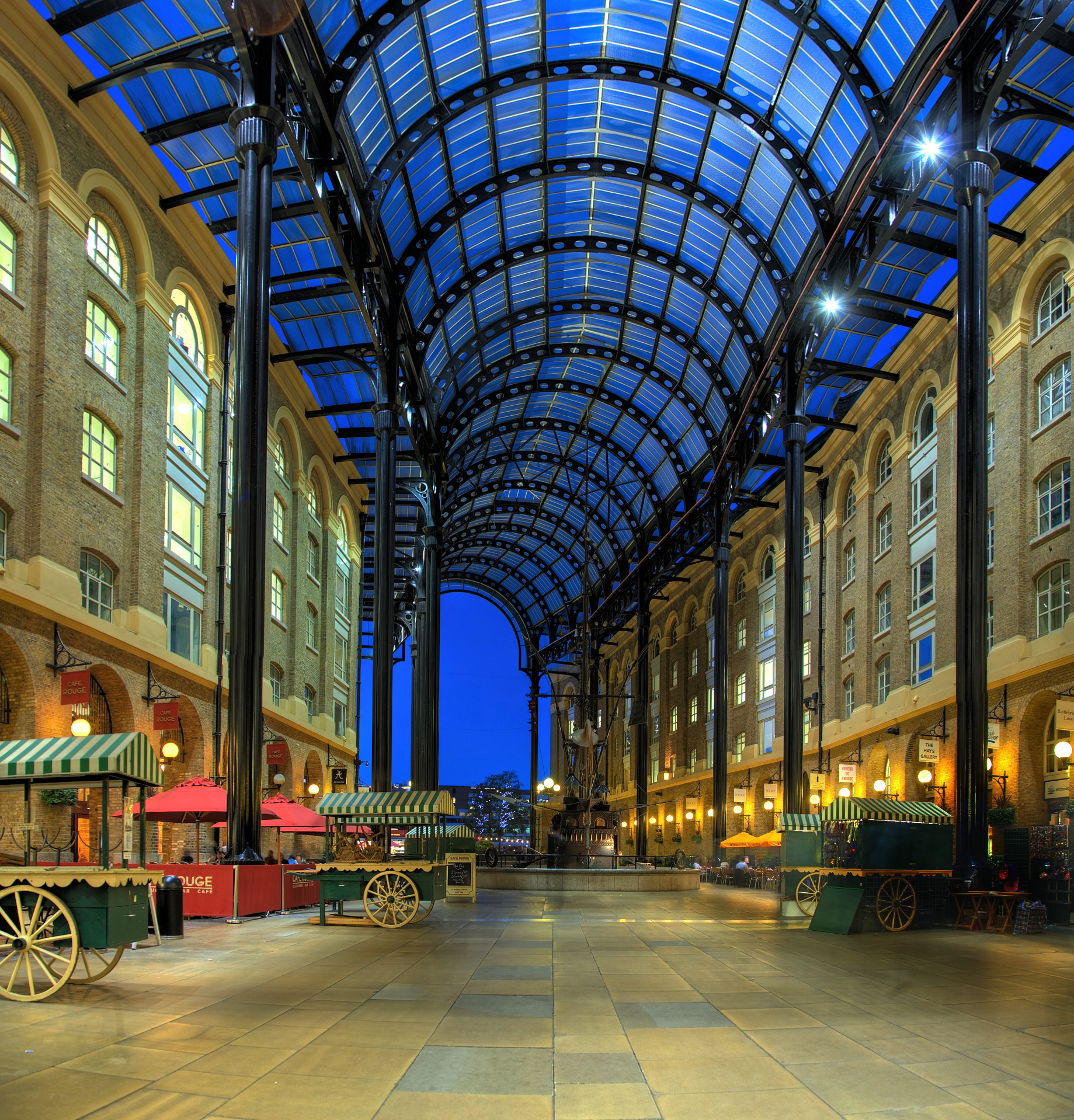
Hay's Galleria

Hay's Galleria is a mixed use building in the London Borough of Southwark situated on the south bank of the River Thames featuring offices, restaurants, shops, and flats. Originally a warehouse and associated wharf (Hay's Wharf) for the port of London, it was redeveloped in the 1980s. It is a Grade II listed structure.

== History ==
=== Hay's Wharf ===
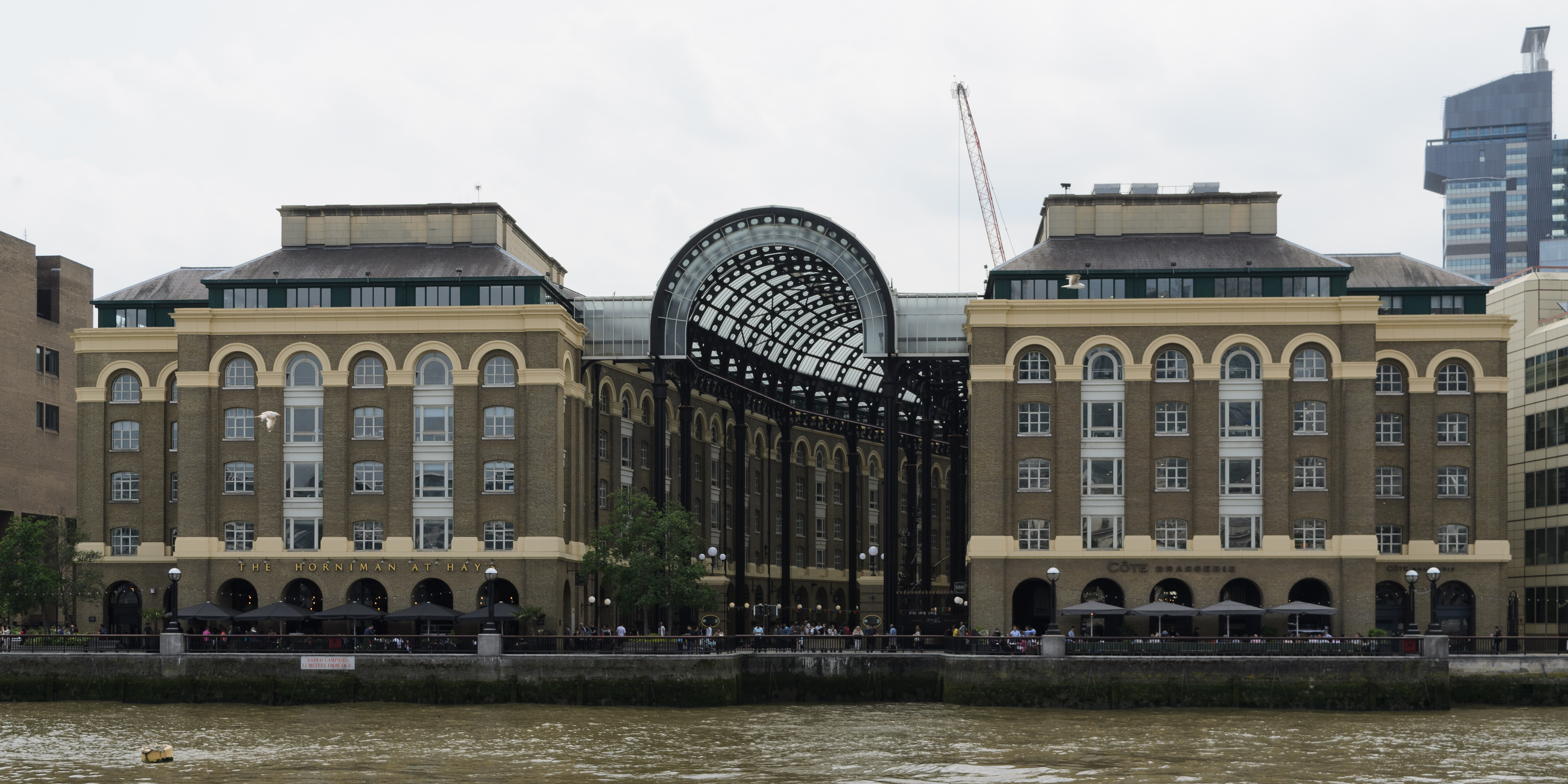
View from the Thames

Hay's Galleria is named after its original owner, the merchant Alexander Hay, who acquired the property – then a brewhouse – in 1651. In around 1840 John Humphrey Jnr acquired a lease on the property. He asked William Cubitt (who was father-in-law to two of Humphrey's sons) to convert it into a 'wharf', in fact an enclosed dock, in 1856 and it was renamed Hay's Wharf.

During the nineteenth century, the wharf was one of the chief delivery points for ships bringing tea to the Pool of London. At its height, 80% of the dry produce imported to London passed through the wharf, and on this account the wharf was nicknamed 'the Larder of London'. The wharf was largely rebuilt following the Great Fire of Southwark in June 1861 and then continued in use for nearly a century until it was badly bombed in September 1940 during the Second World War.

In 1920, the owners of the wharf purchased the shares of Pickfords as part of their Hay's Wharf Cartage Company subsidiary. This subsidiary was sold to the Big Four railways in 1933.

The progressive adoption of containerisation during the 1960s led to the shipping industry moving to deep water ports further down the Thames and the subsequent closure of Hay's Wharf in 1970.

=== Redevelopment ===
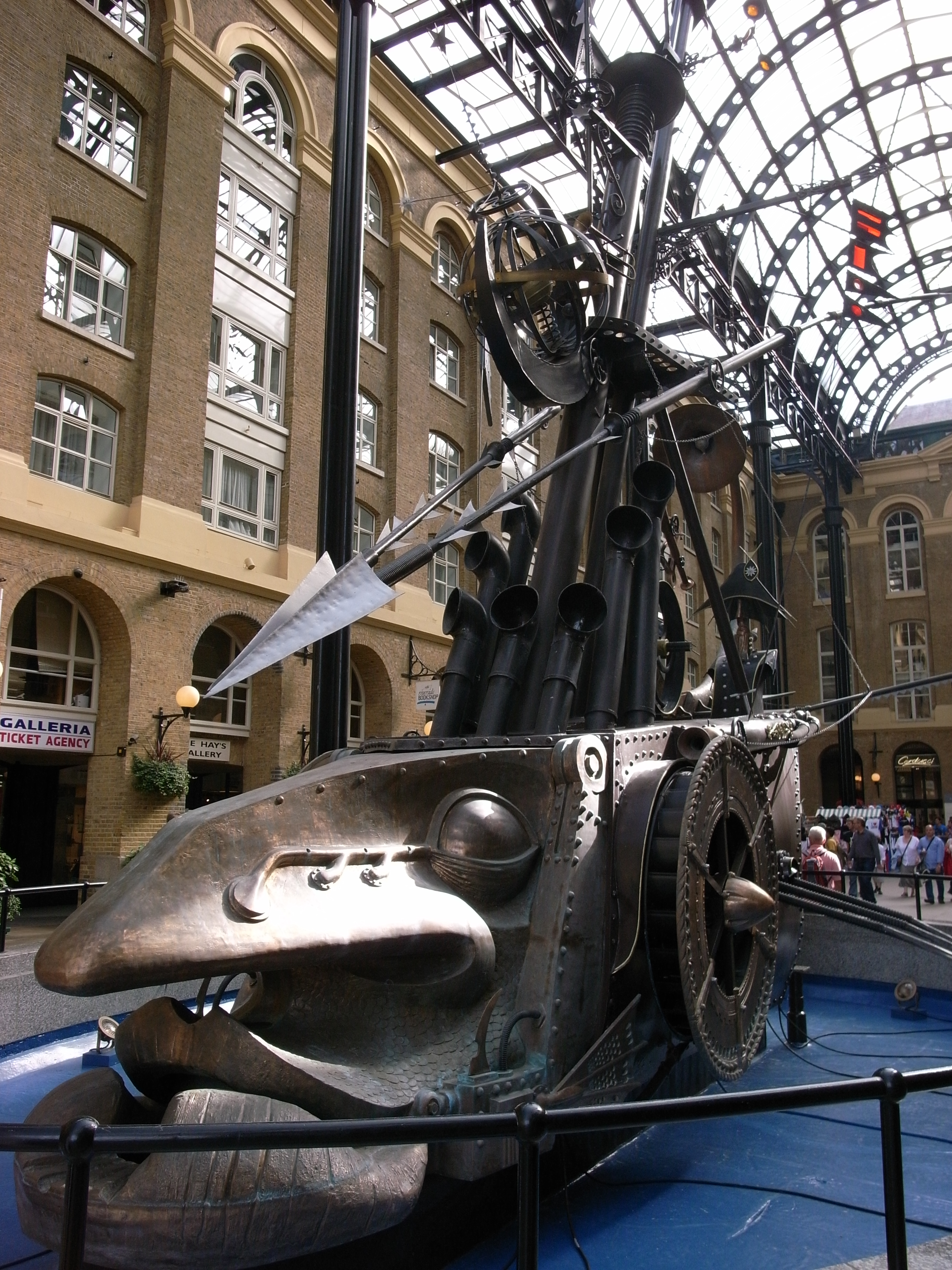
The Navigators, 1987, a sculpture by David Kemp

In the 1980s, with the increasing urban regeneration of the Thames Corridor and nearby London Docklands, the majority of the area was acquired by the St Martin's Property Corporation, the real estate arm of the State of Kuwait. The easterly end of the site was developed as London Bridge City of which Hay's Galleria' forms part. The decision was made to retain the dock and to restore its tea and produce warehouses surrounding it to provide office accommodation and shops. The dock gates were permanently closed, the 'impounded' area of the dock was covered with a floor to the sill of the wharf-sides and the entire space was enclosed with a glass roof. It was designed by Twigg Brown Architects as part of their masterplan for the renewal strategy. In a fountain at the centre of the Galleria is a 60 ft moving bronze sculpture by sculptor David Kemp called 'The Navigators', created in collaboration with Bob Clements, lead architect for Hay's, who wanted a dynamic sculpture that reflected the Galleria's shipping heritage in contrast with London Bridge City's more conservative desire for static stone. Unveiled in 1987, the sculpture was originally set in a dark green grey pool, meant to reflect the Thames and the ocean's depths. The modern bright blue caused Kemp to comment in 2013 that the sculpture "seems to have lost any dark, mysterious ambiance, and connections with the deep brooding waters of the passing Thames? Instead, the Iron Fish basks in a brightly lit turquose [sic] swimming pool, a sea-monster on its Hols. Perhaps "fish-face" should now be wearing sun glasses?"

The development was supported by the London Docklands Development Corporation. After its completion and opening in 1987, Hays Galleria became the first new visitor attraction of that period on the south of the river.

== Activities ==
Office tenants have included the UK social work regulator, the General Social Care Council, and the Social Care Institute for Excellence. The pub at the riverside entrance, 'The Horniman at Hay's', is named to commemorate one of the main tea-producing companies associated with the trade here.

Due to its location on the southern Thames Path, its panoramic views over the City of London from the riverside, and the location between London City Hall and Southwark Cathedral, Hay's Galleria is visited by many tourists and local workers. For 20 years it housed a year-round market - the Hays Galleria Market, which operated seven days a week. It had a resident artist, and for more than 2 decades, it was home to several permanent independent traders, long-term tenants of St Martins Property Corporation selling souvenirs, touristic apparel, and jewellery from traditional barrows positioned in fixed locations in the Galleria. On 8 October 2010, on the orders of CBRE, the managing agents, the barrows were removed. The barrows were reinstated under the new managing agents post 2014, and as at 22 August 2017 there are 8 barrows operating in the Galleria.

== Transport ==
- River services: London Bridge City Pier (Commuter service)
- Tube/National Rail: London Bridge station

== See also ==
- London Bridge Hospital – on the riverfront nearby
- St Olaf House
