= Gunnar Johansson (psychophysicist) =

Swedish psychophysicist (1911–1998)

Gunnar Johansson (1911–1998) was a Swedish psychophysicist.

== Biography ==
He was interested in the Gestalt laws of motion perception in vision. He is best known for his investigations of biological motion. He helped develop the rigidity assumption which posits that proximal stimuli that can be perceived as rigid objects are generally perceived as such. Johansson received his Ph.D. from the Stockholm University College in 1950, on the thesis Configurations in event perception. He was professor of psychology at Uppsala University from 1957 to 1977. In 1970, he was elected a member of the Royal Swedish Academy of Engineering Sciences.
