= John Felix Raj =

Indian economics professor and priest

John Felix Raj SJ
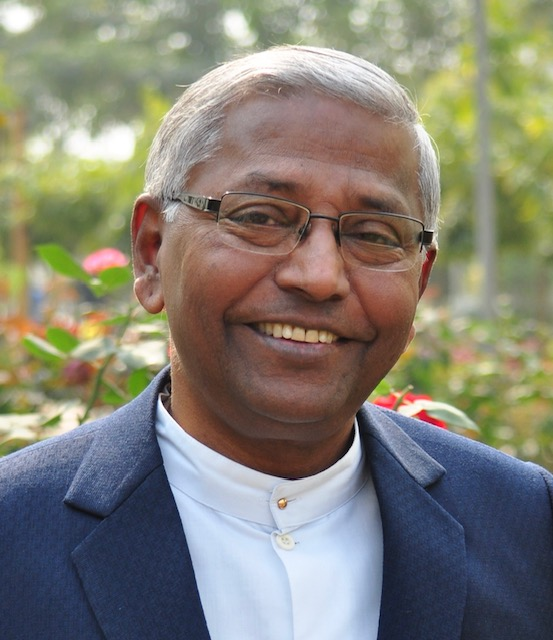

Personal life
- Born: 26 August 1954 (age 71) Poolangudi, Ramnad District, Tamil Nadu, India
- Education: Loyola College, Chennai; St Joseph's College, Tiruchirappalli; Rabindra Bharati University
- Occupation: Founder Vice-Chancellor of St. Xavier's University, Kolkata
- Ordination: 23 April 1989
- Website: www.felixrajsj.com

John Felix Raj is a professor of economics at St. Xavier's University, Kolkata (SXUK), India. He is a Jesuit priest of the Calcutta province of the Society of Jesus. He was the Rector from 1996 to 2002 and Principal from 2009 to 2017 of St. Xavier's College, Kolkata.

== Early life ==
Raj was born on 26 August 1954 in Poolangudi, Ramanathapuram district, Tamil Nadu. He completed his school education at St. Michael's School, Sengudi and at St. Mary's High School, Thoothukudi.

== Education ==
He joined the Jesuit Order in 1974 at the age of 20. He graduated from Loyola College, Chennai in 1980 in Economics and acquired a master's degree from St Joseph's College, Tiruchirappalli. He underwent his Jesuit training of philosophy in Pune at JDV and theology at Delhi Vidyajothi Institute respectively. He was ordained priest on 23 April 1989. He completed his Ph.D. in economics in Rabindra Bharati University, Kolkata.

== Career ==
Since 1996, Raj is the Director and Secretary of the Goethals Indian Library and Research Society in Kolkata.

Raj opened a rural campus at Raghabpur for St. Xavier's College, Kolkata in 2014. Raj took over as the first Vice-Chancellor of St. Xavier's University, Kolkata (SXUK) from 16 February 2017.

Raj was named Banga Bibhushan in 2014 by the West Bengal government.

In 2021, during Raj's vice-chancellorship at SXUK, an assistant professor resigned and alleged that she was forced to do by Raj and other administrators. According to a police complaint she filed, Raj called her into a meeting, told her that a family had complained about swimsuit photos of her that she had posted on social media, and threatened to fire her if she did not resign. The university claimed the resignation was voluntary and sent the former employee a defamation letter seeking ₹99 crore in damages. An online petition calling for disciplinary action against Raj received over 21,700 signatures by August 2022. In July 2023, the Supreme Court of India refused to hear the case.

== Selected bibliography ==
- Raj Felix (2020). Waves – Story Bank, St. Xavier’s University Kolkata Alumni Association, Kolkata. ISBN 978-93-89734-49-2.
- Raj John Felix, Roy Samrat, Hati Koushik (2016). Indian Economy: A Visionary Perspective, New Delhi, Regal Publications, ISBN 978-81-8484-524-2.
- Raj, J. Felix (2013). Disinvestment in India : Trends, Problems and Prospects. Regal Publications. ISBN 978-81-8484-205-0.
- Sen, Raj Kumar; Raj, J. Felix (2008). Indian economy : economic ideas, development, and financial reforms. New Delhi: Deep & Deep Publications. ISBN 978-81-8450-055-4.
- Sen, Raj Kumar; Raj, John Felix (2009). WTO and Asian Union. Deep & Deep Publications. ISBN 978-81-8450-205-3.
