= Basil Samuel =

Basil Samuel (1912–1987) was the founder of Great Portland Estates, one the United Kingdom's largest property businesses.

== Career ==
After training as an estate agent with J. Trevor & Sons, Basil Samuel went into partnership with his brother, Howard, in 1934. Together they started buying up properties in the West End. He served in the British Army in the rank of Captain during World War II and in 1945 returned to London to resume developing properties. In the case of at least one of these properties, Basil and Howard worked in joint venture with Lord Samuel of Wych Cross, their cousin.

In 1959 Basil Samuel established Great Portland Estates and expanded it into one of the United Kingdom's largest property businesses.

Samuel was a prominent horse breeder and owner and was also keen on shooting. He also gave significant sums to charity and was a Governor of the London Hospital.
