= Banani Ghosh =

Banani Ghosh বনানী ঘোষ
- Born: Mymensingh
- Died: 7 June 2023; Kolkata, West Bengal, India
- Genres: Rabindra Sangeet
- Occupation: Singer
- Instrument: vocal

Banani Ghosh (died 7 June 2023) was an Indian Bengali musician, primarily known as an exponent of Rabindra Sangeet, but also specializing in the music of Atulprasad Sen, Rajanikanta Sen and others.

== Biography ==
Ghosh was born in Mymensingh in present-day Bangladesh, her father Prafulla Krishna Ghose was also a musician and poet, and editor of a children's magazine. She was trained in Hindustani classical music and at Shantiniketan with the noted Rabindra Sangeet exponent Kanika Banerjee. Her voice was so similar to her gurus that to some she is known as nakal mohar (the second "mohar", after the Kanika's popular moniker). With a formal degree in music from Rabindra Bharati University, she also trained with Dilip Kumar Roy of Pondicherry. Bursting into the Rabindrasangeet scene in the 1970s, she quickly rose to become an eminent Rabindra Sangeet artist on All India Radio and Doordarshan.

Subsequently, Ghosh lived in Switzerland and in the United States, where she ran Antara, a Rabindrasangeet organization that has trained thousands of pupils across the USA over the years. She also organized the Tagore festival Rabindra Mela, which attempts to familiarize the works of Tagore to an international audience. She also staged a number of dance dramas, Shapmochan (1962), and Bhanushingher Padavali (Rochester, 1983) being particularly notable.

Ghosh died on 7 June 2023.
