= St. Xavier's University, Kolkata =

Jesuit university in India

- সেন্ট জেভিয়ার্স বিশ্ববিদ্যালয়, কলকাতা
- Motto: Nihil Ultra (Latin)
- Motto in English: Nothing Beyond
- Type: Co - Educational
- Established: 8 February 2017; 9 years ago
- Affiliations: UGC, AICTE, BCI, NBA
- Religious affiliation: Catholic Church (Jesuit)
- Chancellor: Rev. Fr. James Arjen Tete, SJ
- Vice-Chancellor: Rev. Fr. (Dr.) John Felix Raj, SJ
- Location: New Town, Kolkata, West Bengal, India; 22.5619°N 88.4875°E
- Campus: Urban
- Patron saint: St. Francis Xavier
- Nickname: The Xaverians
- Website: www.sxuk.edu.in

St. Xavier's University Kolkata is a Jesuit university located in New Town, Kolkata, India. It was established in February 2017 and inaugurated in July of the same year. Although run by the same Jesuit community which administers St. Xavier's College, Kolkata, the college, established in 1860, is independent of and not affiliated to St. Xavier's University, Kolkata, but instead functions autonomously within the University of Calcutta.

== History ==
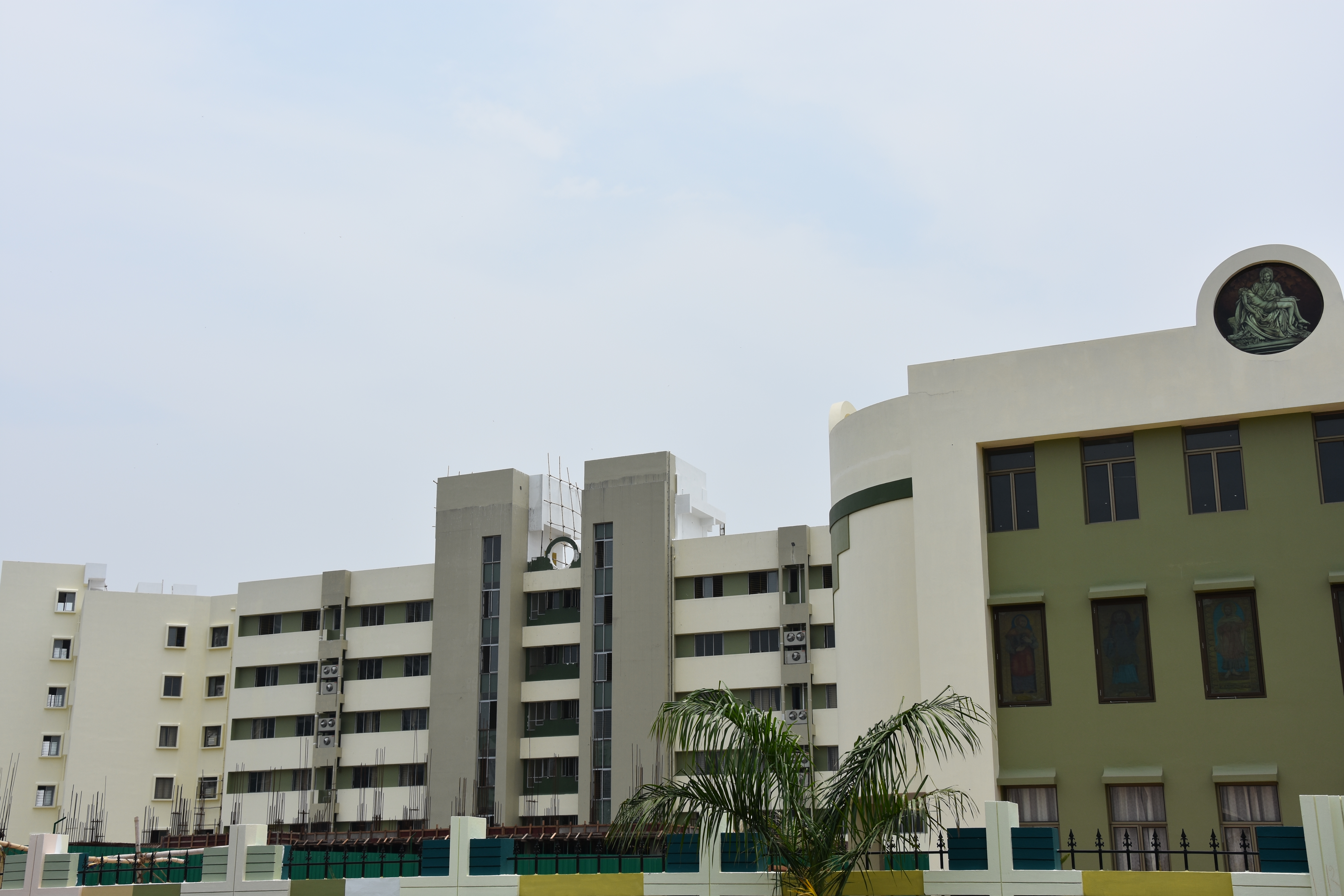
The main university building

In 2011, the St. Xavier's College, Kolkata Alumni Association under its president, Father John Felix Raj, the principal of the college, devised Vision 2020, a ten-year plan which included the founding of St. Xavier's University, Kolkata. In 2012, the Chief Minister of West Bengal, Mamata Banerjee invited St. Xavier's College to open a university. Land was purchased from the government in 2013 and the foundation stone was laid by Mamata Banerjee in December that year. The West Bengal Legislative Assembly unanimously passed the St. Xavier's University, Kolkata Act 2016 on 15 December 2016 and the Governor gave his assent to the Act on 16 January 2017.

The State University of New Town Kolkata (SXUK) was established in February 2017 by the West Bengal government and formally inaugurated in July 2017 by Chief Minister Mamata Banerjee and Lakshmi Mittal, the CEO of ArcelorMittal. The same month, Father Felix Raj took charge of the university as its first vice-chancellor.

By the St. Xavier's University, Kolkata, Act 2016 of the Bengal Assembly, the university may have constituent Jesuit Colleges situated in West Bengal. St. Xavier's College Kolkata Educational Trust is the sponsoring Trust of the university, with the Jesuit provincial as its president and Father Raj as secretary. Also established were the governing board, executive council, academic council, faculty councils, boards of studies and finance committee.

== Controversy ==
A female professor at St. Xavier's University Kolkata was allegedly forced to resign after sharing personal photos on social media. The university reportedly demanded a financial penalty of ₹99 crores. According to the professor, "The vice-chancellor John Felix Raj said this parent had found his son looking at my photographs on Instagram where I was wearing just my undergarments. He said they were sexually explicit and requested the university to save his son from such vulgarity." The professor explained that the photos were posted on 13 June 2021, prior to her joining the university faculty and before she accepted any requests from her students to follow her account which is private. She took the photos as selfies and posted them as an Instagram story which disappeared after 24 hours, so she accused the university panel of gaslighting her. In July 2023, the Supreme Court of India refused to hear the case due to lacking paperwork.

== See also ==
- St. Xavier's College, Kolkata
- List of Jesuit sites
