= Minerva House =

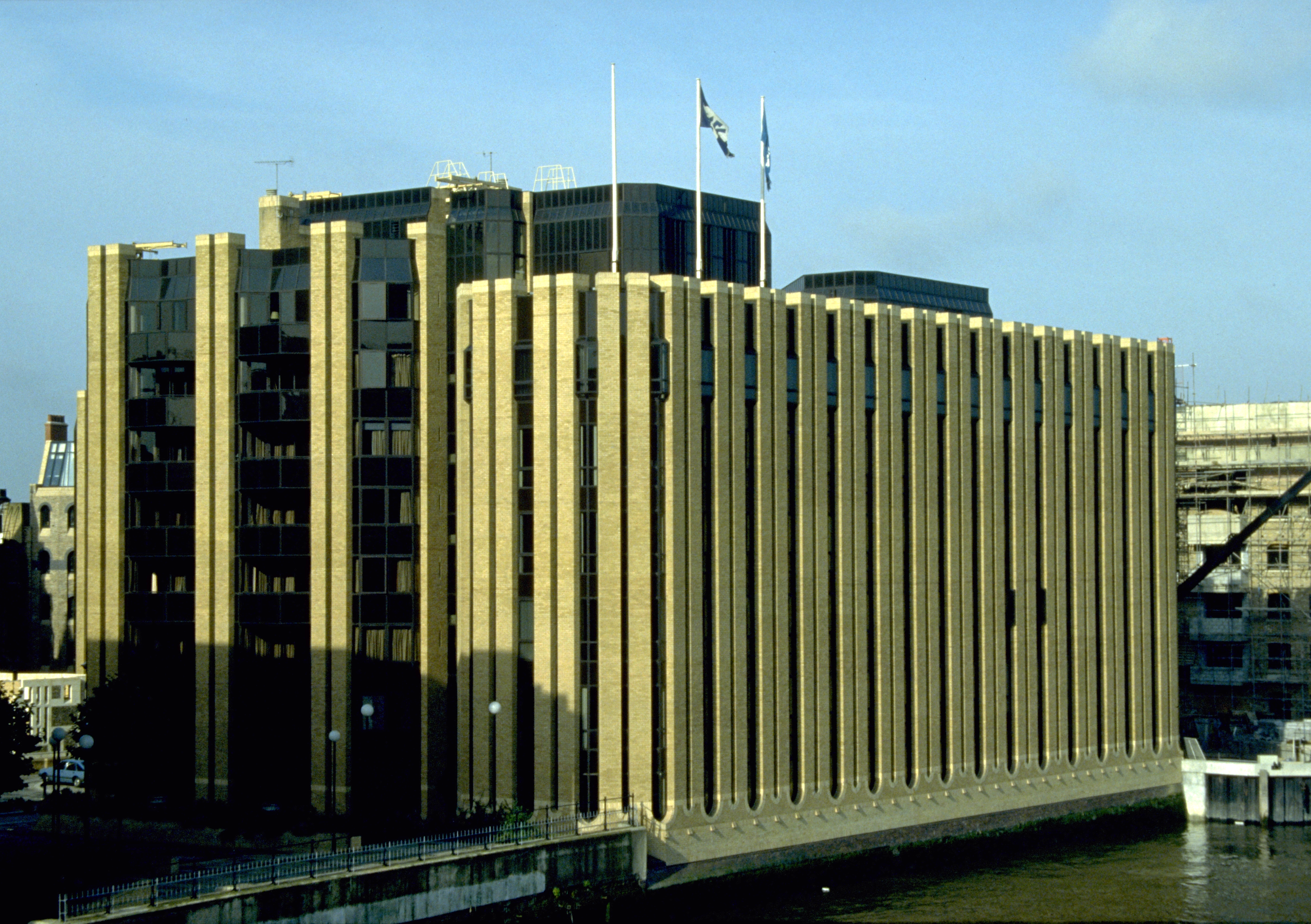
- Minerva House c. 1985

- Location within London Borough of Southwark
- Etymology: Minerva, Roman goddess of wisdom and sponsor of arts, trade & strategy

General information
- Status: Completed
- Location: Southwark, 5 Montague Close, London SE1 9BB, UK
- Coordinates: 51.506844°N 0.089897°W
- Current tenants: Winckworth Sherwood LLP and Ipsos Mori
- Topped-out: 1983
- Owner: Great Portland Estates

Technical details
- Material: Yellow brick
- Floor count: Six

Design and construction
- Architecture firm: Twigg, Brown & Partners

Minerva House was built between 1979 and 1983 as the London office of Grindlays Bank with Twigg, Brown & Partners as architects. The yellow brick building features narrow windows between closely paired piers. It sits on the south bank of the River Thames just west of London Bridge.

== History ==
=== The site ===
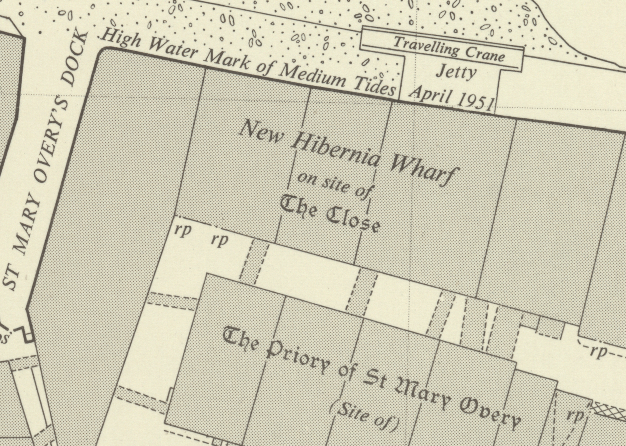
An extract from the Ordnance Survey 1:1,250 map of London sheet TQ3280SE published 1952 showing New Hibernia Wharf and environs

Cartographic sources show that the site has previously housed:

- The Close of the nearby Southwark Cathedral since the 14th century
- Hibernia Wharf since at least 1888
- New Hibernia Wharf since at least 1947

=== Sales ===
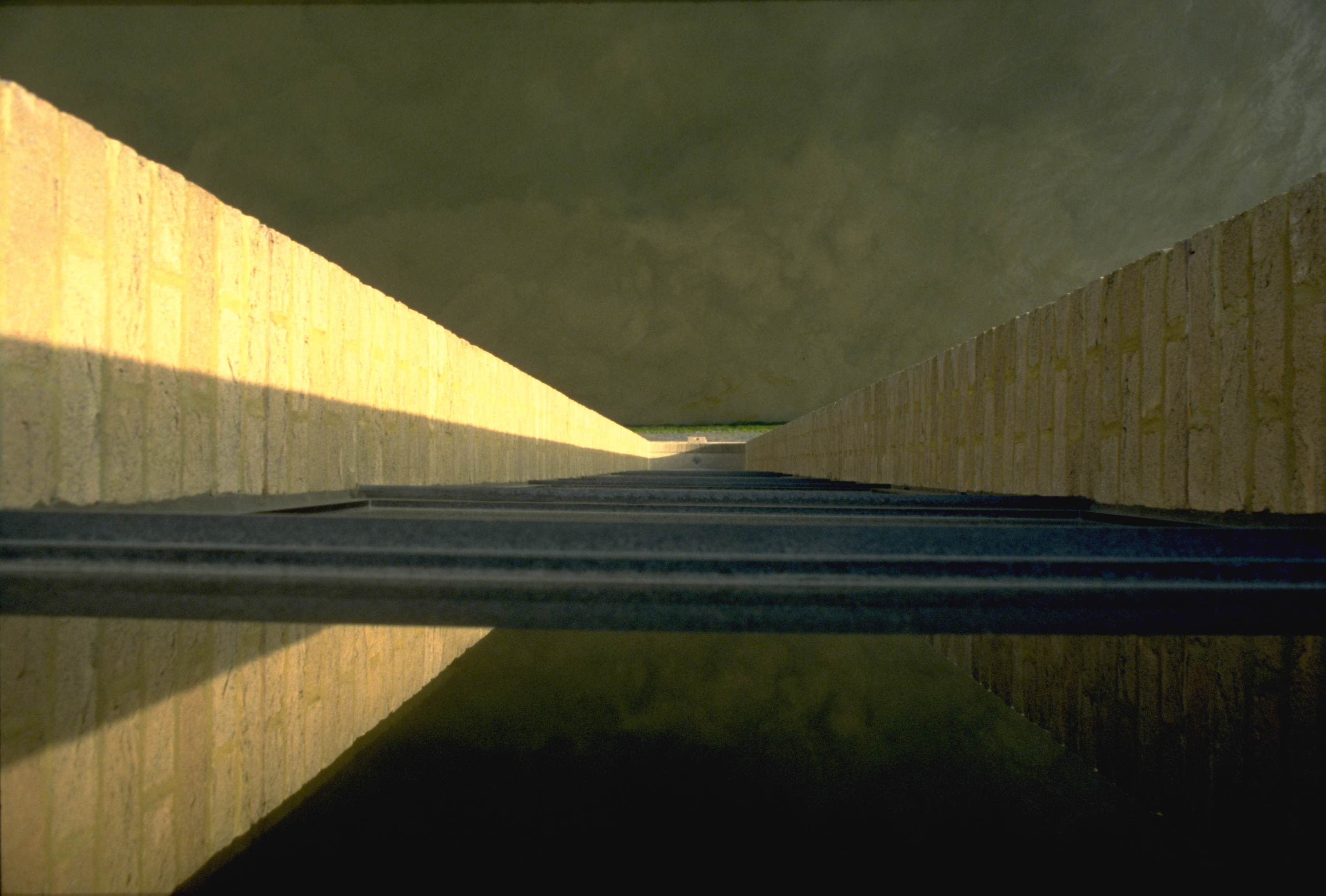
Down a column to the Thames

Minerva House was sold for around £42 million in 2005 and for £60 million in 2012.

== Use ==
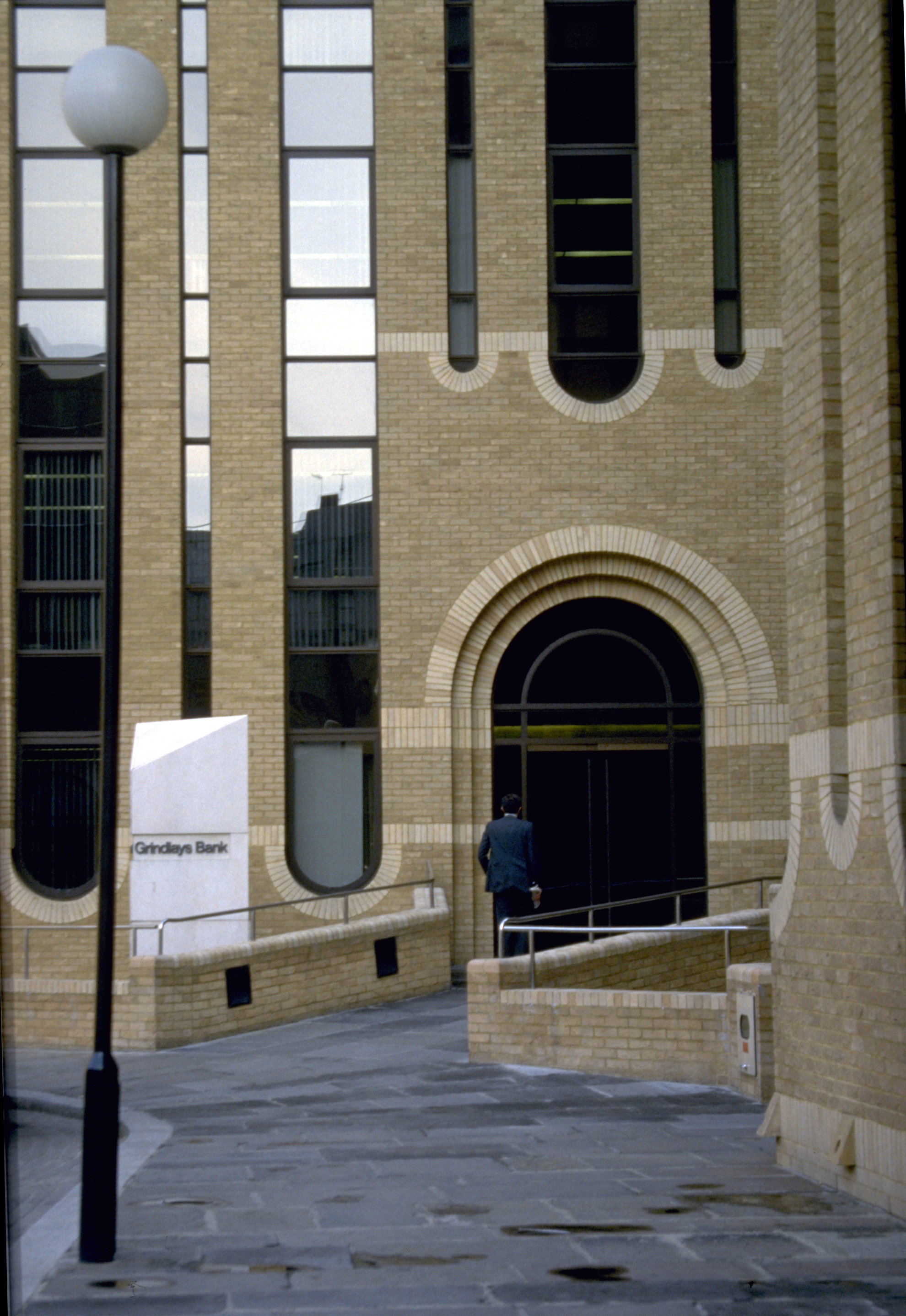
Main entrance c. 1986

Following the acquisition of Grindlays by Standard Chartered Bank in 2000, the building was refurbished during 2006 and is had mixed use with 103,686 square feet (9,632.7 m^{2}) of office space over six floors and thirty four flats in 11,900 square feet (1,110 m^{2}) of residential space. In 2022 works redevelopment of the building began that include partial demolition works with the retention of the existing structural frame and partial facade replacement, a 3-storey extension of the existing building to create a building up to 9 storeys, incorporating additional office floorspace, new external roof terraces and new public realm landscaping at ground level.

== Owners ==
The current owners are Great Portland Estates. Previous tenants prior to the redevelopment works included Winckworth Sherwood LLP, TUI, Guy's and St Thomas' NHS Foundation Trust and Wandle Housing Association Ltd.
