= Grindlays Bank =

Historic British bank

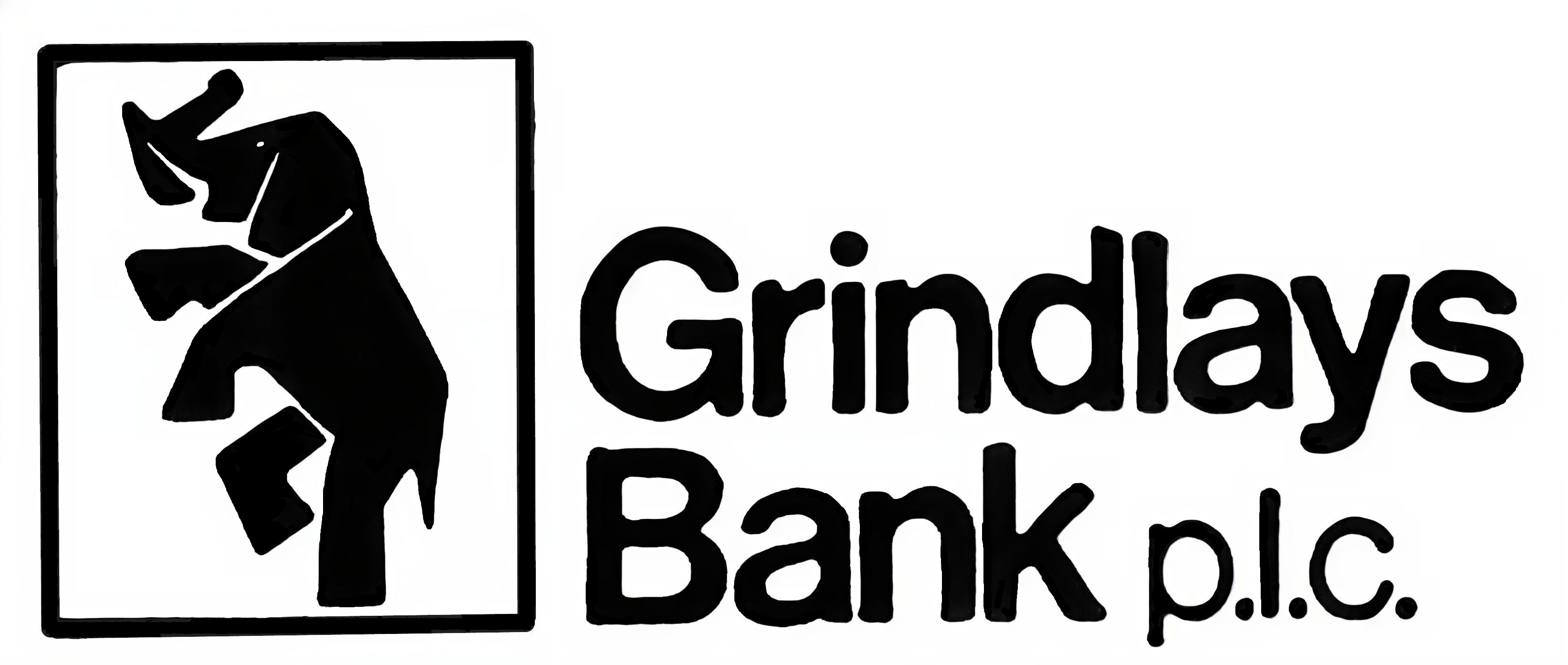

- Grindlay & Co, 54 & 55 Parliament Street, Westminster on 22 August 1899
- Industry: Banking, insurance, financial services
- Founded: 1828; 198 years ago in London, United Kingdom
- Founder: Robert Melville Grindlay
- Fate: Acquired by ANZ Bank in 1984
- Headquarters: London, United Kingdom
- Number of locations: 183 (1863-1963)
- Area served: Europe; Asia-Pacific; Middle East; Africa
- Key people: Notable Chairmen: Toby Low, 1st Baron Aldington; Donald Campbell, 2nd Baron Colgrain; Sir Jeremy Raisman
- Total assets: £277.3 million (1963); ~£7.4 billion (2023)
- Number of employees: c.10,000 (1963)

The historic overseas bank was established in London in 1828 as Leslie & Grindlay, agents and bankers to the British Army and business community in India. Banking operations expanded to include the Indian subcontinent, the Middle East and elements of Africa and Southeast Asia. It was styled Grindlay, Christian & Matthews in 1839, Grindlay & Co from 1843, Grindlay & Co Ltd from 1924 and Grindlays Bank Ltd in 1947 until its merger with the National Bank of India.

The National Bank of India was formed in 1863 and became one of the larger London overseas banks operating not only in the Indian sub-continent but in communities around the Indian Ocean. In 1948 it merged with the smaller Grindlays Bank Ltd, renaming itself National and Grindlays Bank Ltd some ten years later. Following further acquisitions, its name was shortened to Grindlays Bank in 1974, and then renamed ANZ Grindlays Bank when it was taken over by Australia and New Zealand Banking Group in 1984. Standard Chartered Bank acquired ANZ Grindlays in 2000, after which the Grindlays name fell out of use.

== History ==
=== Grindlays ===
Captain Robert Melville Grindlay (1786 - 1877) established the firm, Leslie & Grindlay, in London in 1828, to arrange secure passage to and from India for customers and their baggage. Initially based in Birchin Lane near Lombard Street in London, the company acted as agents to organise travel arrangements and provide advisory services for their clientele, particularly East India Company employees and British officials. Expansion of the business saw the opening of several other offices in the City of London (Cornhill and Bishopsgate) and Westminster (Whitehall and St James's Square).

In time, under the guidance of Capt. R M Grindlay, the firm added private banking, insurance, and other financial activities to its menu of services, and operations expanded to include Europe, the Middle East, South and Southeast Asia, and elements of Africa. The acquisition of additional partners during this period, caused the firm to change its name to Grindlay, Christian & Matthews in 1839 and then Grindlay & Co. in 1843. When Grindlay eventually retired in 1842, the firm had become "the most distinguished bankers and agents to the civil and military officials of the business community and the British Army in India".

The firm remained based solely in London until 1854 when offices were opened at Calcutta in 1864 and then Bombay in 1865. These offices were largely autonomous, administered from London, until the local partners interests were bought out in 1908. Additional branches were opened in Simla (1912), Delhi (1923), Lahore (1924) and Peshawar (1926).

Grindlays was regarded as "pre-eminently bankers to the Indian Army", concentrating in areas of important civil or military headquarters, and undertook little commercial banking. The failure of army bankers, MacGrigors in 1922 and then the Alliance Bank of Simla in 1923, encouraged the Grindlays partners to seek the security of a larger organisation. In 1924, the Bank was acquired by the National Provincial Bank, converted into a company and allowed to operate independently as Grindlay & Co Ltd. When National Provincial decided to exit overseas banking in 1948, it sold Grindlays to the National Bank of India, in which it took a small share position.

=== National Bank of India ===
The Calcutta City Banking Corporation was formed in 1863 as an Indian registered bank, changing its name to the National Bank of India (NBI) a few months later. Offices in London and Bombay followed in 1864 and 1865. Crucial to the Bank's future, its head office was transferred to London in 1866 and the company was registered under the UK Companies Act, giving it much greater international potential, but it was a move that was fiercely contested for many years.

NBI remained with these three offices until 1870 when it sought to exploit opportunities in China with a branch in Hong Kong and, later, in Shanghai. Substantial losses threatened the Bank and the Chinese operations were eventually closed. Without neglecting its domestic market, NBI began to expand around the fringes of the Indian Ocean, particularly Aden and East Africa; by 1900 NBI had 19 branches and £10m of assets.

Steady expansion continued through the early 1900s and by the outbreak of World War I NBI was the seventh largest of the London-registered overseas banks. Growth continued during the War and by 1918 the Bank's assets were £33m with record profits of over £400,000. Around that time, detailed discussions took place with Lloyds Bank and agreement was reached in principle for Lloyds to acquire NBI but, according to the Bank's official history, the proposal was vetoed by "the authorities".

The inter-war years saw NBI stagnate; only two new branches were opened and there was no growth in the Bank's assets. More substantial change was to come after the Second World War. In August 1947 India was granted independence with all the turmoil that entailed in the Bank's main market. Undaunted, the following year NBI purchased Grindlays Bank from National Provincial Bank, then Grindlays Bank Ltd; Grindlays then had deposits of around £20m compared with over £70m for NBI.

=== National and Grindlays ===
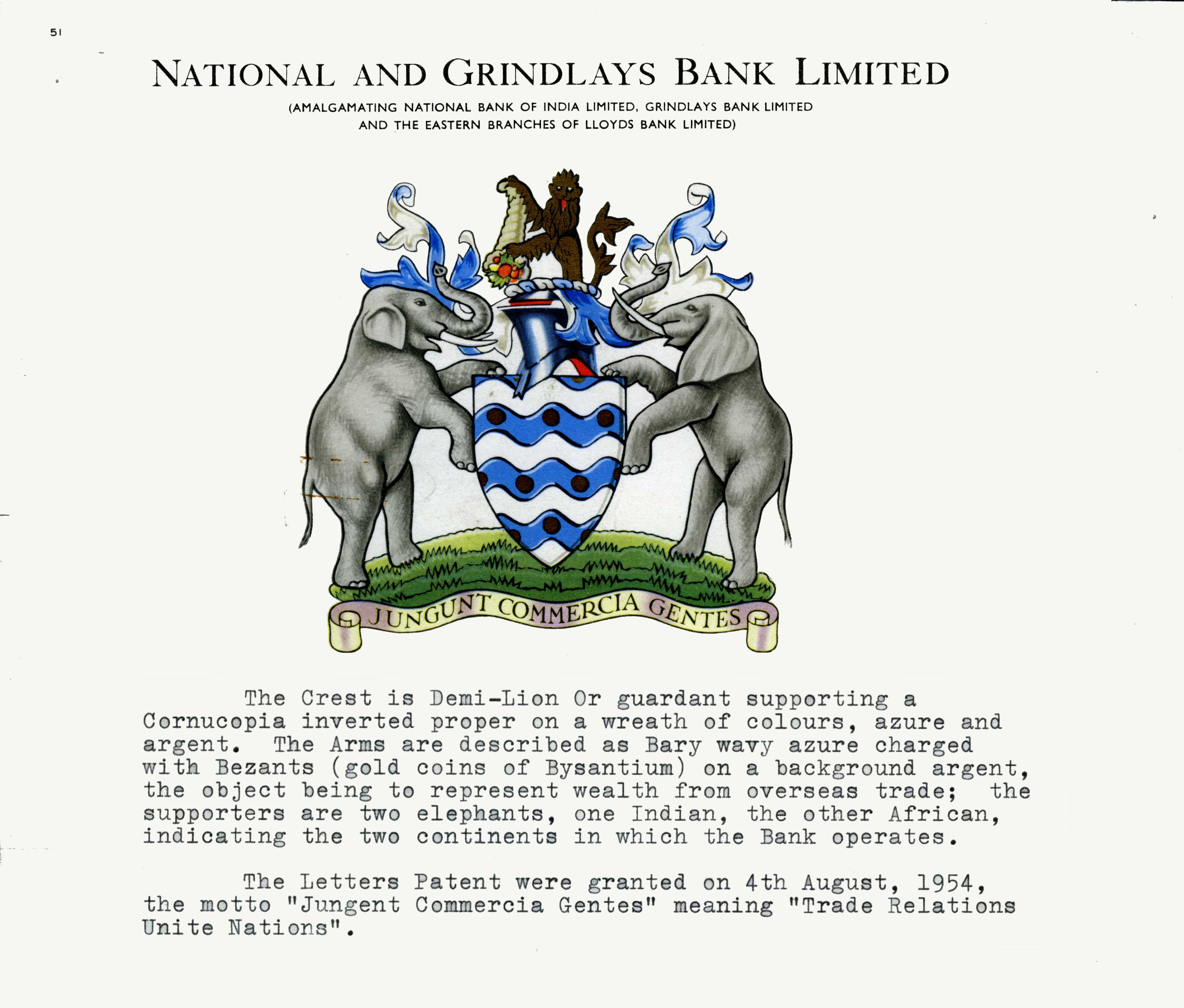
Coat of Arms of National and Grindlays Bank

NBI and Grindlays were not merged operationally until 1958 under the name National Overseas and Grindlays Bank, renamed National and Grindlays Bank (NGB) in 1959. In 1961, NGB exchanged a 25 per cent share in NGB for Lloyds Bank’s Eastern Division, an operation which included the celebrated Cox’s Bank, "par excellence bankers to the British Army". In 1968 National Provincial Bank sold its shareholding to Lloyds Bank and in 1969, Citibank took a 40 per cent stake in NGB.

Also in 1969, the Ottoman Bank sold its branches in London, Cyprus, Sudan, Jordan, Qatar, East Africa, the Emirates, and Rhodesia to the National and Grindlays Bank, which dropped the National prefix in 1975. Grindlays Bank later bought the Ottoman Bank's separate operations in France and Geneva, Banque Ottomane, and renamed them Grindlays Bank - France.

In 1984 Citibank and Lloyds sold Grindlays to the Australia and New Zealand Banking Group. In 1989, five years after it acquired Grindlays, ANZ changed Grindlays' name to ANZ Grindlays Bank and transferred its domicile (requiring an Act of Parliament) to Australia in 1996. In 1993, ANZ Grindlays sold its African operations to Standard Bank Investment Corporation (Stanbic), which was the holding company for Standard Bank of South Africa's operations outside South Africa. Standard Chartered Bank had sold its shares in Standard Bank of South Africa to the bank's existing shareholders in 1987 to escape anti-apartheid sanctions against South Africa.

In 2000, ANZ sold its Grindlays subsidiary to Standard Chartered for US$1.34 (A$2.2) billion in cash, which merged it with its existing banking operations.

== See also ==
- Robert Melville Grindlay, the founder of Grindlays Bank
- Grindlay family, the wider family into which Captain Robert Melville Grindlay was born
- Minerva House, Grindlay's London headquarters from 1983
- List of banking families

== Gallery ==
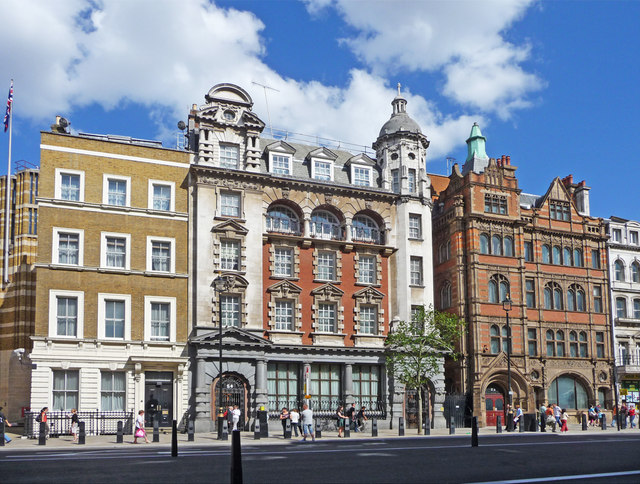
Frontage of the historic Grindlays Bank in 2009

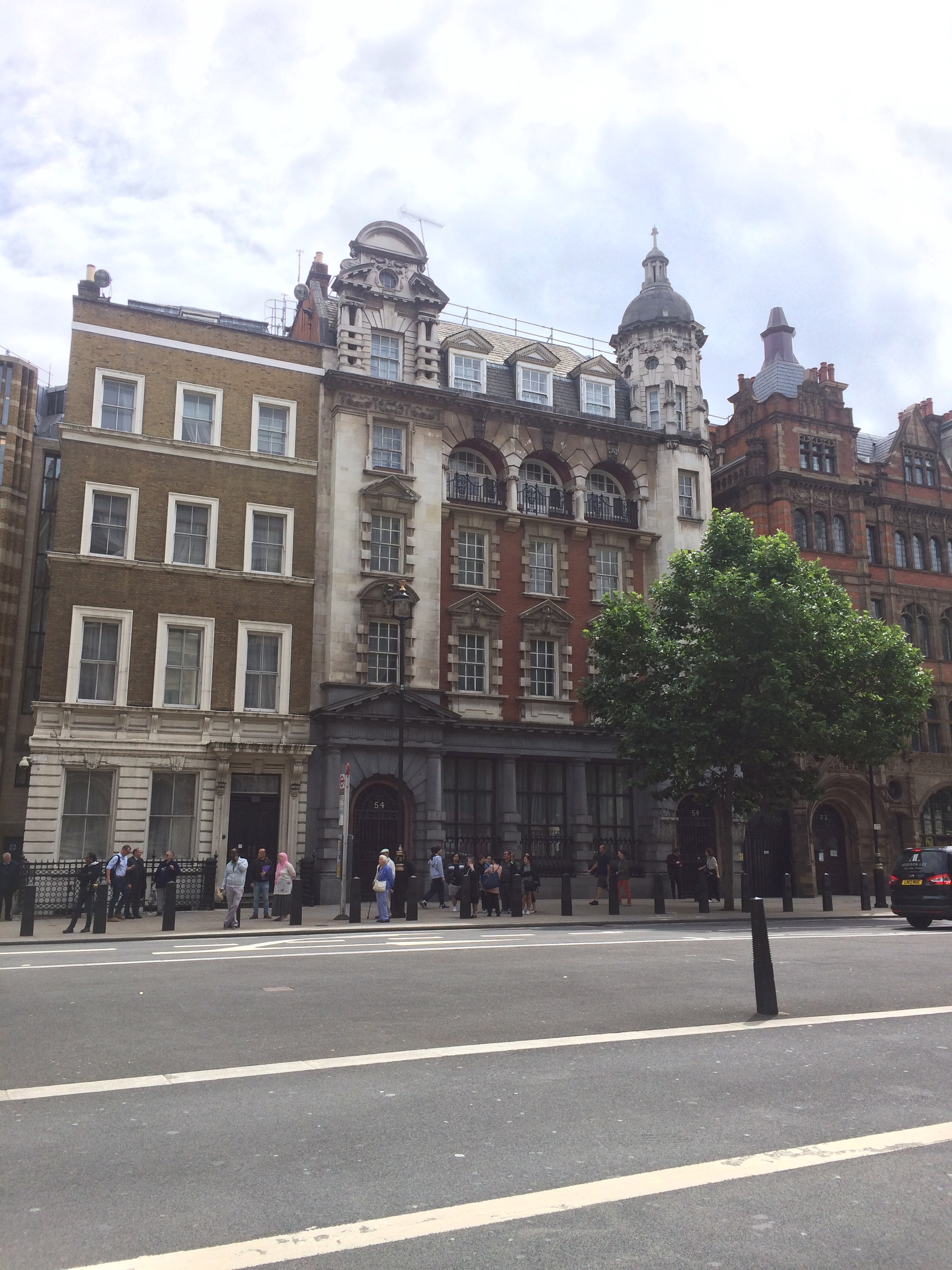
Facade of Grindlay & Co headquarters, 54 and 55 Parliament Street, London (2017)

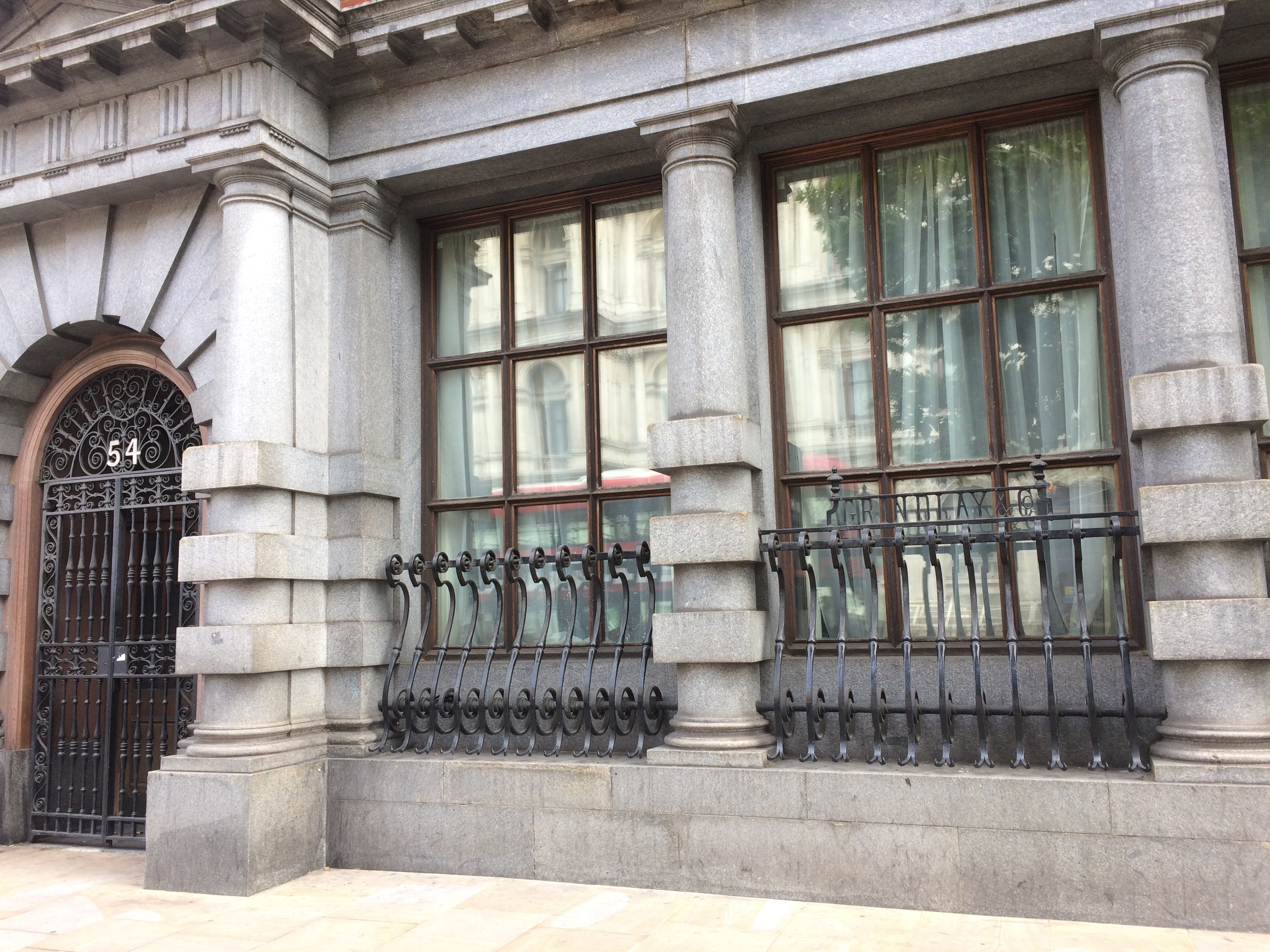
'Grindlay & Co' lettering can still be seen on the railings outside 54 and 55 Parliament Street (2017)

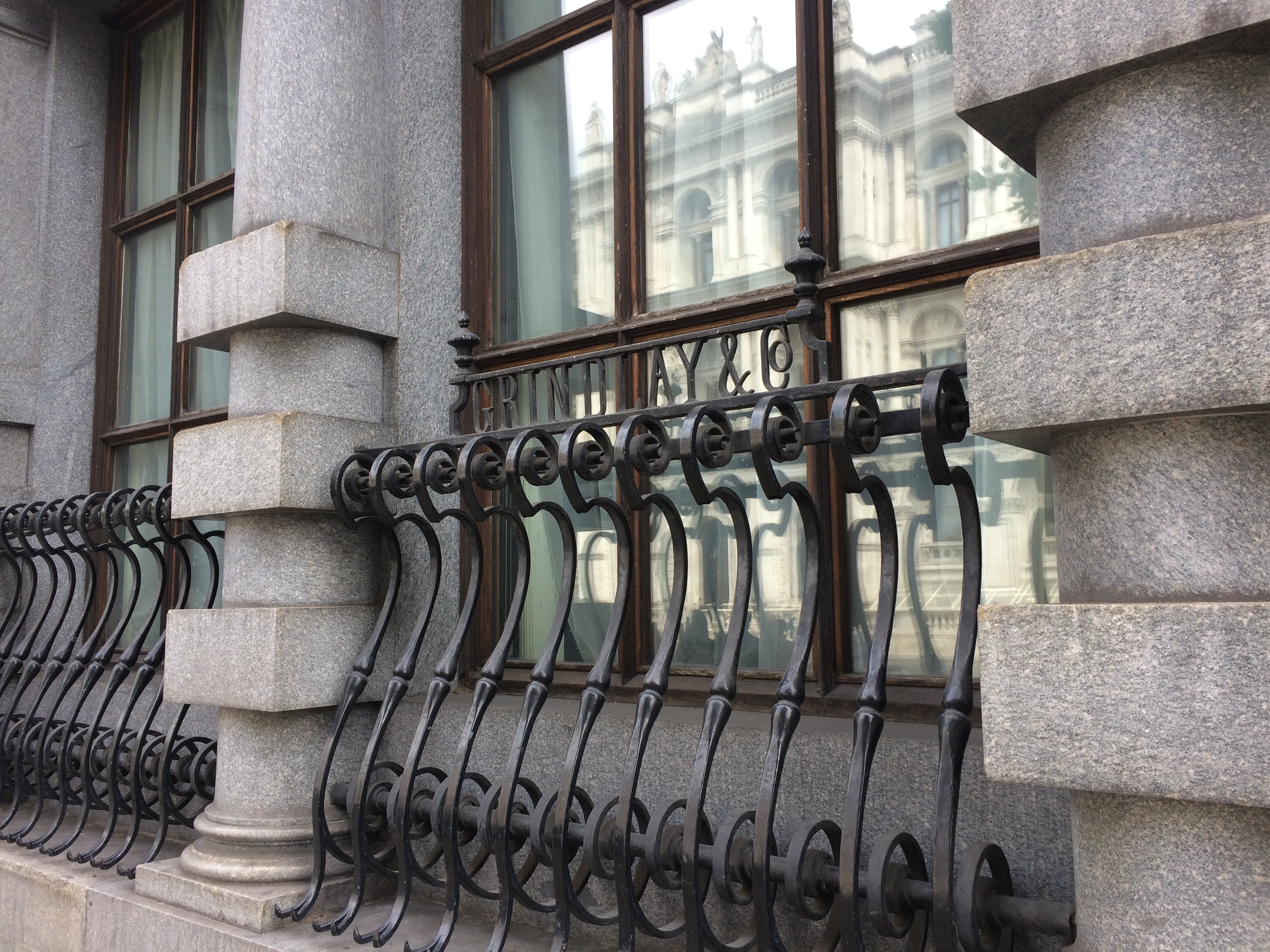
Railings outside 54 and 55 Parliament Street (2017)

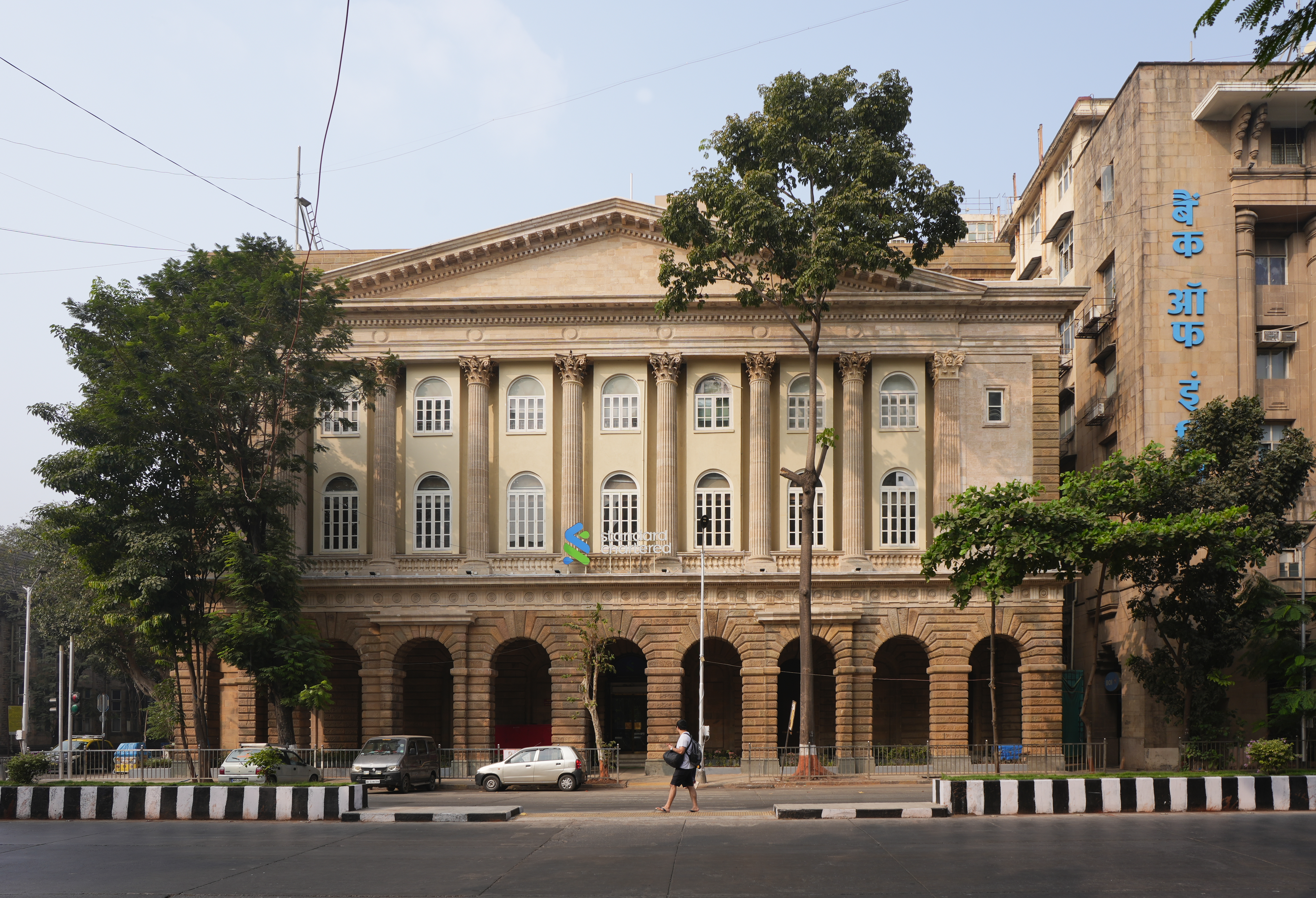
Grindlays Bank, now Standard Chartered Bank building, in Fort, Mumbai (2023)

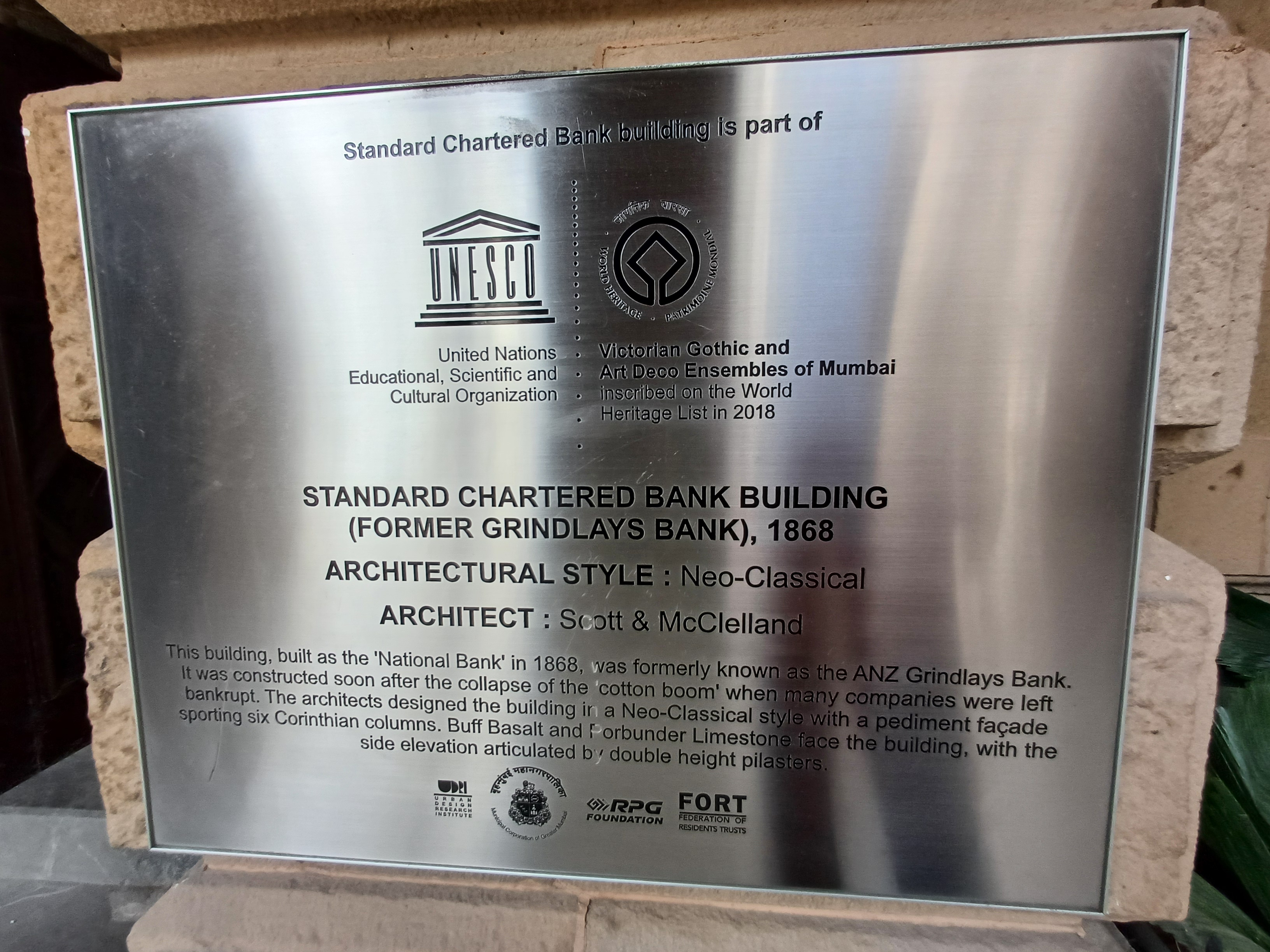
UNESCO plaque on former Grindlays Bank building in Mumbai, now a World Heritage Site (2024)

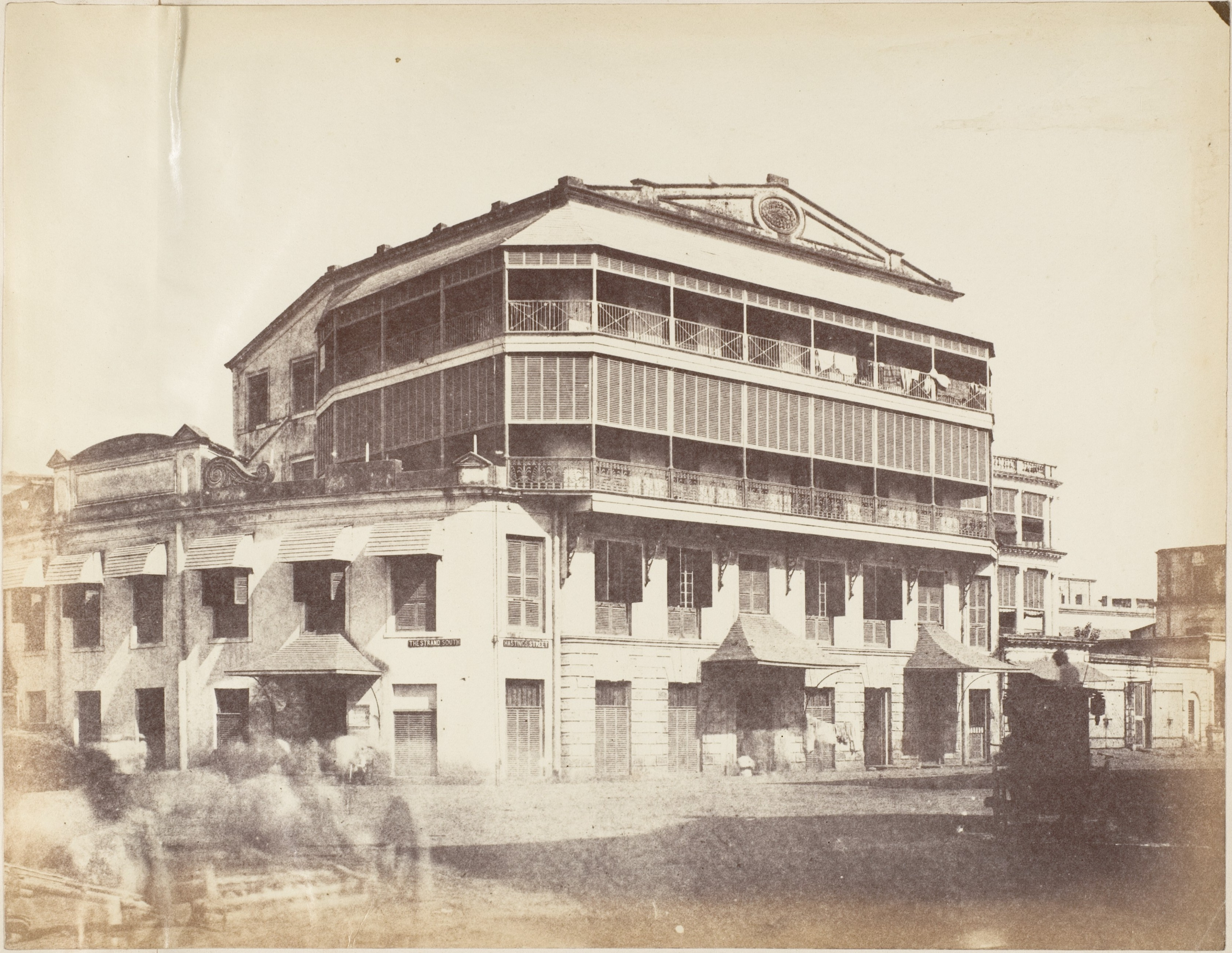
Grindlay & Co building in Calcutta (1850s)

ANZ Banking Group Act 1996, moving Grindlays Bank domicile to Australia in 1996

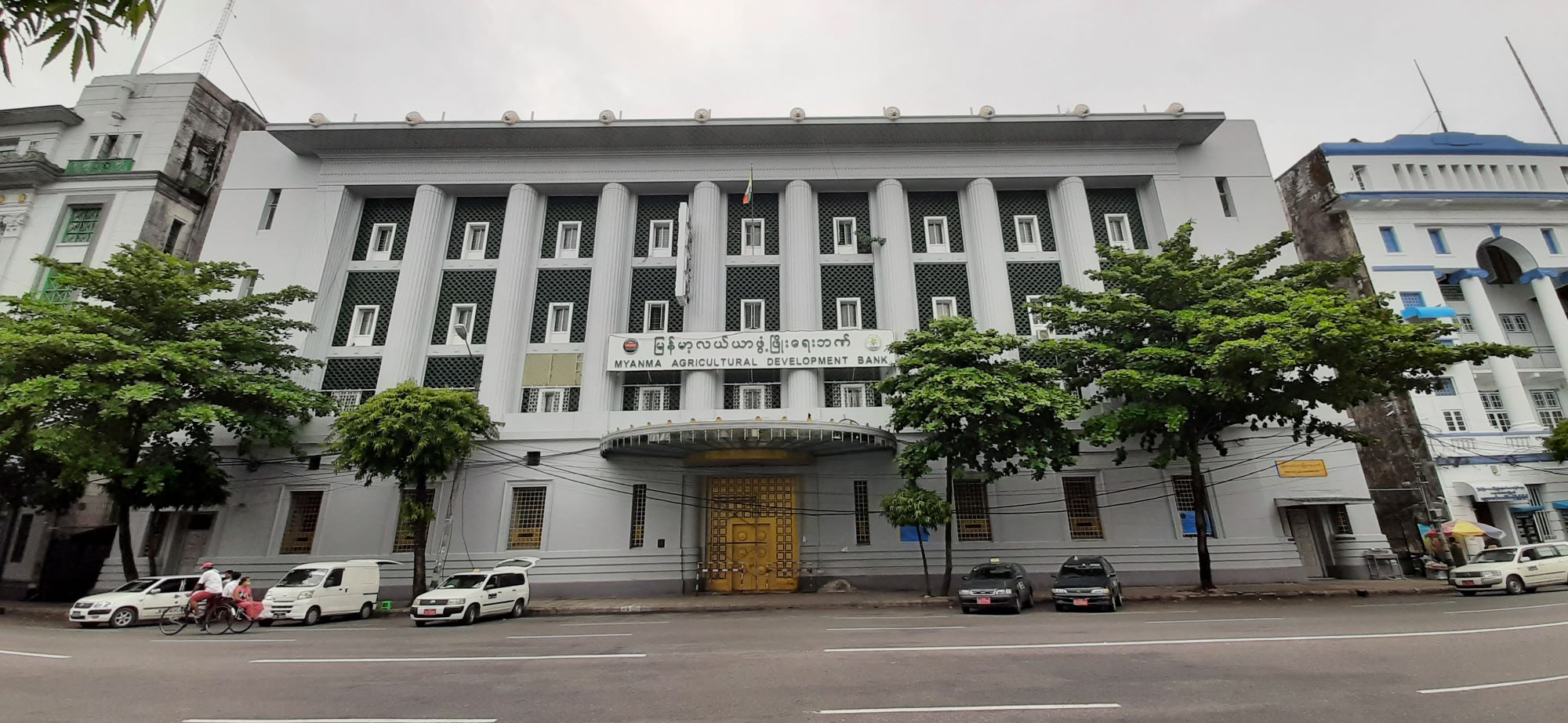
Former Grindlays Bank building in Yangon, Myanmar, and latterly the National Museum of Myanmar (2020)

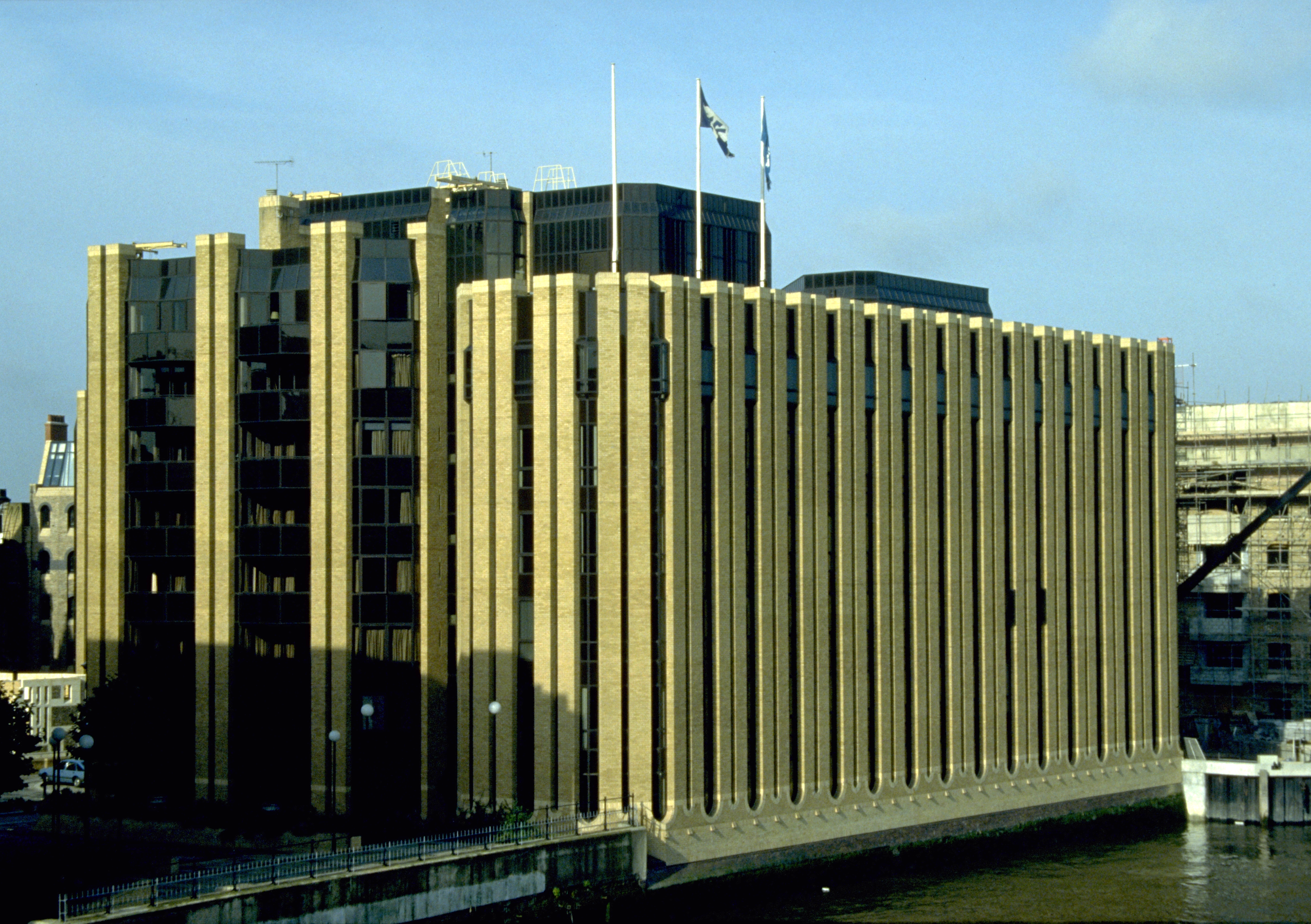
Minerva House overlooking the Thames. Headquarters from 1983
