= Parietal-temporal-occipital =

Portions of the parietal, temporal and occipital lobes

The parietal-temporal-occipital (PTO) association area, also referred to as the temporo-parieto-occipital (TPO) junction, is an area within the cerebral cortex where the parietal, temporal and occipital lobes meet. High level of interpreting meaningful signals in the surrounding sensory area. They have functional subareas:

- Analysis of the spatial coordinates of the body
- Posterior occipital cortex
- Anterior parietal cortex

This association area—one of three in the cortex—is responsible for the assembly of auditory, visual, and somatosensory system information. Meaning is assigned to stimuli in the PTO, which outputs to numerous other areas of the brain, notably the limbic and prefrontal association areas, which are involved in memory.

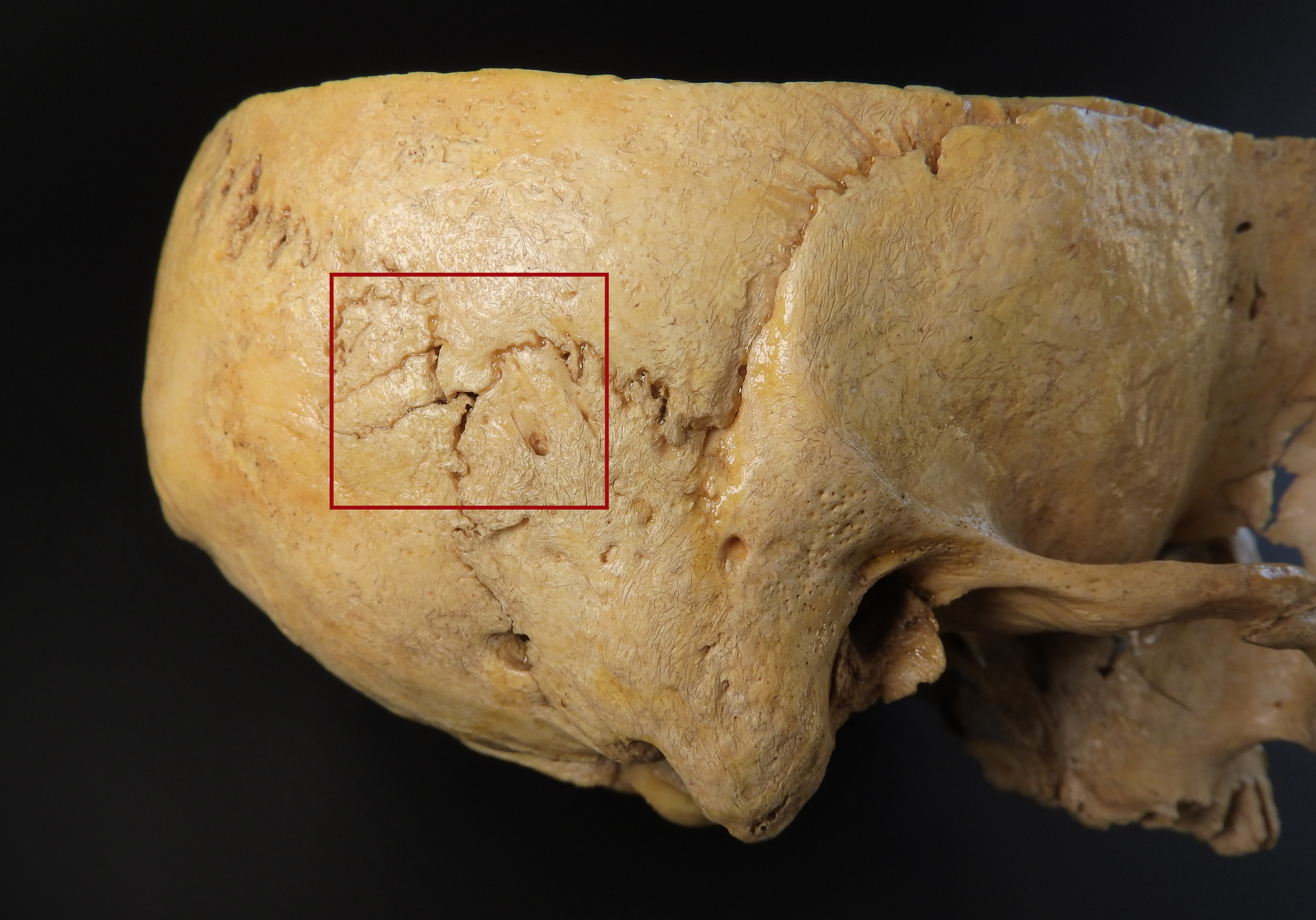
Bone under the parietal-temporal-occipital area

== Analysis of spatial coordinates of the body ==
This is an area beginning with the posterior parietal cortex and extending to the superior occipital cortex. A function of the Perietal-Temporal-Occipital is the analysis the spatial coordination of body parts. This area receives visual sensory information from the periphery occipital cortex and somatic sensory information from the anterior parietal cortex. From this, the information coordinates and computes the visual auditory information from the body surroundings.

In the left hemisphere, the PTO is involved in language recognition (reading, listening, and braille), but is not entirely responsible for these tasks. Language in all its modalities is covered using many different parts of the brain including Heschl's gyrus in the left hemisphere. In the right, the PTO identifies the spatial characteristics of objects and is involved in spatial awareness.
