= Psychology of dance =

Psychological perspectives about dance

The psychology of dance (or dance psychology) is the set of mental states associated with dancing and watching others dance. The term names the interdisciplinary academic field that studies those who do. Areas of research include interventions to increase performance and promote health, programs for stimulating children's creativity, dance movement therapy, mate selection and emotional responses.

== Audience perception ==
Continuous response data provide choreographers information about audiences' perception of their dance material. Matches and mismatches between the choreographer's intention and the audience's response were found by continuously judging the emotions expressed when audience members watched Sue Haeley's Fine Line Terrain. Key moments and intended structural changes described by the choreographer were mapped onto the continuous response data to compare the choreographer's intent and the audience's perception.

Surface features of dance contribute to audience arousal. Audience members continuously indicated their arousal and valence while viewing the Quantum Leap Youth Choreographic Ensemble's Landscape: time, place, and identity by continuously judging valence and emotion portrayed by the dance. Researchers compared this to choreographic notes about emotions expressed during the piece and found that arousal was related to changes in music and dancer activity.

== Recognizing emotion ==
=== Adults ===
Laban Movement Analysis categorizes human movement based on the duration of time and tempo changes, the contraction and expansion of limbs and the tension and dynamics of movement. In an experiment, subjects viewed 20 videos of dancers performing the same dance attempting to convey anger, fear, grief or joy. Viewers performed at an above-chance level for all but one performance of grief. The highest recognition rate was for grief, followed by anger, then joy. An automated recognition system attempted to find movement cues for different emotions. Fear was expressed with low fluency and many contractions in toward the body, joy with very fluent motion, and grief with frequent transitions between motion and pauses, reducing fluency. The extracted cues were validated by the spectators' recognition of the different emotions in movement and the dancers' performing the emotions similarly.

Observers picked up emotion even without facial expressions. Raters with no dance experience watched videos of a dancer performing movement with seven different motives and six emotions, but with a neutral face. Raters employed a list of motive terms including happy, lonely, sharp, natural, solemn, dynamic and flowing. They assessed emotional intensity on a scale of one to four concerning happiness, surprise, loneliness, fear, anger and disgust. All the intended emotions and motives were perceived, showing that attempts to communicate emotion and motivation via movement can succeed.

Individuals participating in dance therapy identify feelings similar to those observing the activity. Participants attempted each posture after viewing a photograph or a model in the posture. Participants noted the emotion they associated with each posture. Responses were the same whether the subject was observing or embodying the posture, except for anger. Movers noted an anger response more often than observers.

=== Children ===
Four-, five-, and eight-year-old children and adults watched videos of movement expressing joy, anger, fear and sadness and indicated which emotions they perceived in each video. All age groups achieved recognition scores above chance level. The four-year-olds had the lowest scores, while the five-year-olds achieved levels close to the eight-year-olds' and the adults' scores.

== Expertise ==
=== Ballet and Indian dance ===
Untrained, frequent spectators and novices of ballet or Indian dance watched videos of ballet, Indian dance, and non-dance soloists. Motor-potentials (MEPs) in their hands and arms were used to measure corticospinal excitability. In ballet, the arms are used frequently, while the hands are used in Indian dance. Participants had higher MEPs in their arms when watching ballet compared to Indian dance. Ballet spectators' visual experience, not motor experience, drove motor resonance.

=== Position sense ===
Dancers have more accurate position sense than non-dancers allowing them to rely more on position sense than vision. Experts, amateurs and novices differ in their mental representations based on spatial parameters. Subjects in each group viewed clips of basic classical ballet steps and noted the spatial parameters of basic action concepts (BACs), which are mental representations of each part of a movement. For the pas assemblé, amateurs and experts clustered the movement into functional phases, but for the pirouette, only experts had adequate spatial parameters. This suggests that experts retain spatial parameters in their long-term memory and that dancers use mental imagery to memorize long complex phrases.

== Participating in dance ==
Dancers think in different modes, remember complex movement and respond to the other dancers. Communication between dancers occurs through direct perception of motion, recognition of structure and neural mirroring. Dancers' memory includes procedural knowledge of how to move their bodies and declarative knowledge of specific combinations. Thus, dance is similar to language, where grammar depends on procedural memory and memory of words depends on declarative memory. Dance also involves feelings and personal experience.

Each contemporary dancer has a moving identity as a result of a collection of choreographic and training influences that reveals a personal narrative.

One Duke University study found that dancers learn routines in different ways, whether by dancing at half speed or in their minds.

A study has found that participating in synchronised dancing facilitates group bonding and higher pain thresholds more so than participating in unsynchronised dancing together.

== Emotion ==
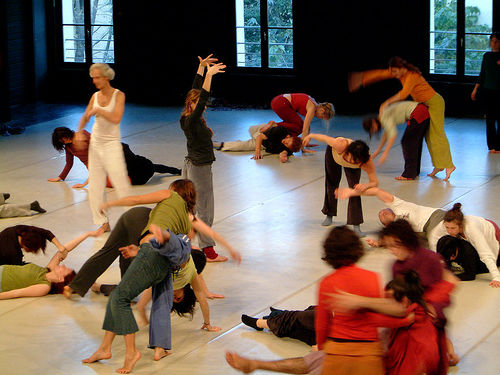
Dance improvisation

=== Empathy ===
Empathy mediates cognition in dance improvisation. Through understanding others' emotions and intentions, dancers make affective motor decisions. Improvised movement is based on embodied cognition, the theory that the body reveals the nature of the mind, motor cognition, that cognition is embodied in action, social cognition, dancers' understanding of others' actions and emotions, and situated cognition, that knowing is inseparable from action. Mirror neurons underlie many movements, allowing dancers to subconsciously respond to stimuli from the other dancers. Empathy provides temporary structuring of movements, which allows contact improvisation to be a kind of choreography.

=== Creativity ===
Emotions were shown to affect creativity through arousal and valence interactions for subjects playing the video game Dance Dance Revolution. Participants were randomly assigned to three different levels of exertion, representing levels of arousal. While the participants danced, an experimenter randomly gave them either a very bad grade or a very good grade, attempting to affect the subject's mood. After dancing, the participants were tested on valence, mood, arousal, creativity and level of physical and mental energy. Lower arousal levels resulted in higher creativity scores when a negative mood was induced. With higher arousal levels, a positive mood resulted in greater creativity than a negative mood.

== Schools ==
Dance employs emotion, creativity, cultural influence and symbolism to convey meaning. Dance resembles verbal language because it has a vocabulary (dance movements) and grammar (system for combining movements). Dance increases connectedness among students and between students and teachers in the classroom. In schools students can enhance bodily-kinesthetic intelligence, reorganize neural pathways to improve learning, and express knowledge through dance.

Dance helps students to develop a sense of self as an emotional and social being. In preschool, children developed language, movement and collaborative skills to express their ideas. They created and named poses, learned ways of breathing to apply in different emotional situations, mirrored others' movements, incorporated emotions into their movement and participated in free movement. Children enhanced their social cognition and raised their awareness of their bodies.

== Therapy ==
=== Dance movement therapy ===
Dementia patients who participated in a dance movement therapy (DMT) intervention showed improved cognition compared to a control group. The intervention group participated in nine thirty- to forty-minute sessions of dance movement therapy. The control and intervention groups completed the Mini-Mental State Examination (MMSE), the Word List savings score, the instrumental activities of daily living (IADLs) and the Clock Drawing Test a week before, immediately before, at week five, at week nine and four weeks after the intervention. MMSE scores improved in the DMT group at follow-up and IADL scores improved in the DMT group at week 9. The changes were small, but intervention-related improvements in visuospatial ability were found.

=== Aerobic dance ===
An aerobic dance program improved older adults' executive function. Participants were assigned to a freestyle workout, which involved patterns of movement, or a combination style workout, in which they learned a long choreographic routine. Their cognitive function was tested immediately before and after the forty-minute dance class with a task-switching reaction time test. Performance improved in the combination group after the program, while there was no change in the freestyle group.

=== Jazz dance ===
A jazz dance class study was conducted to improve older adults' balance, cognition and mood. These were measured with the MMSE, Geriatric Depression Scale (GDS), and Sensory Organization Test (SOT), respectively before (time 1), at the midpoint (time 2), and after (time 3) the class. Differences in MMSE and GDS scores were not significant, but SOT scores increased from time 1 to time 2 and from time 2 to time 3.

== Implications about mate selection ==
=== Symmetry ===
Charles Darwin suggested that dance is a signal for natural selection in courtship. Fluctuating asymmetry (FA) measures quality of dancing, where higher scores indicate lower quality. Higher FA individuals are less attractive. They are more likely to engage with other FA individuals. A motion capture study of videos of Jamaican dancers, altered to make the dancers unrecognizable used FA ratings to categorize the dancers. Male and female subjects assessed dancing ability and identified the dancer's sex. Symmetrical dancers were rated as significantly better than others, but female symmetry accounted for less than it did in males. Female evaluators more strongly preferred symmetrical male dancers than male evaluators, while there was no gender difference in ratings of female dancers. Lower FA male evaluators were less likely to prefer dances performed by symmetrical females. This study was retracted in 2013 at the request of one of its authors after noticing an inconsistency between the data sheets.

=== Risk-taking ===
Mate preference occurs when women perceive risk-taking in men from motion cues in dance. Non-professional heterosexual male dancers completed the Sensation Seeking Scale (SSS-V) assessing their attitudes towards risky activities, thrill-seeking, partying and sexual activities. Women viewed videos of them dancing alone in a room and rated them on perceived risk-taking and perceived attractiveness. Mean attractiveness ratings of the dancers correlated positively with their mean risk-taking and sensation seeking ratings.
