= Empathic accuracy =

Measure in psychology

In psychology, empathic accuracy is a measure of how accurately one person can infer the thoughts and feelings of another person.

The term was introduced in 1988, in conjunction with the term "empathic inference," by psychologists William Ickes and William Tooke. Since then, research on empathic accuracy has explored its relationship with the concepts of affect sharing and mentalizing. In order to accurately infer another's psychological state, one must be able to both share that state (affect sharing), and understand cognitively how to label that state (mentalizing). Neuroscience research has shown that brain activation associated with empathic accuracy overlaps with both the areas responsible for affect sharing and mentalizing.

Empathic accuracy is an aspect of what William Ickes called "everyday mind reading". A person's understanding of the states of others is extremely important to that person's successful social interaction, and the costs of failing in this task can be high, as seen in the social difficulties of people with autism spectrum disorders. Empathic accuracy is linked to positive peer relationship outcomes and overall healthy adjustment for adolescents. In adult relationships, empathic accuracy correlates with stable romantic relationships.

An early summary of the research on empathic accuracy is found in the edited volume Empathic Accuracy (1997). A more recent summary is available in a single-author book titled Everyday Mind Reading: Understanding What Other People Think and Feel (2009). A discussion of the mirror system as it pertains to empathy and empathic accuracy is found in Marco Iacoboni's Mirroring People: The Science of Empathy and How We Connect with Others (2009).

== History ==
=== Rogerian view ===
In 1951, Carl Rogers published Client-Centered Therapy, the work he is most known for. In it, he created three guidelines for psychologists to follow in a therapeutic session with a client: to have unconditional positive regard, empathy, and genuineness. Roger's goal was to have the client actualize his or her own inherent potentialities (which is termed self-actualization). But, according to Rogers, self-actualization could not be accomplished until the need for positive regard, positive self-regard, and having a self-concept were gained. The therapist's empathy thereby helps to move the client towards self-actualization. Empathy in Rogers's client-centered therapy means to better understand the client and his or her issues. This relates to empathic accuracy because Rogers's intent was not to make the client feel pitied, but for the psychologist to be in tune with the client's needs and perspectives. To do so, the psychologist must be an accurate "reader".

=== Social psychology ===
Empathic accuracy was a topic of social psychological research in the 1990s. Social psychology explored how empathic accuracy relates to the concept of empathy in general.

Social psychologists posit two main theories for how people empathize with others: simulation theory and theory theory. In simulation theory, we understand another by putting ourselves in that other's state, simulating their experience. Theory theory is more cognitive: we find meanings in other's behaviors and contextual cues, and use those to construct an idea of that person's internal mental state.

Empathic accuracy requires both processes; simulation theory correlates with the affect-sharing aspect of empathic accuracy, while theory theory relates to one's ability to effectively mentalize about that shared affect.

=== Neuroscience ===
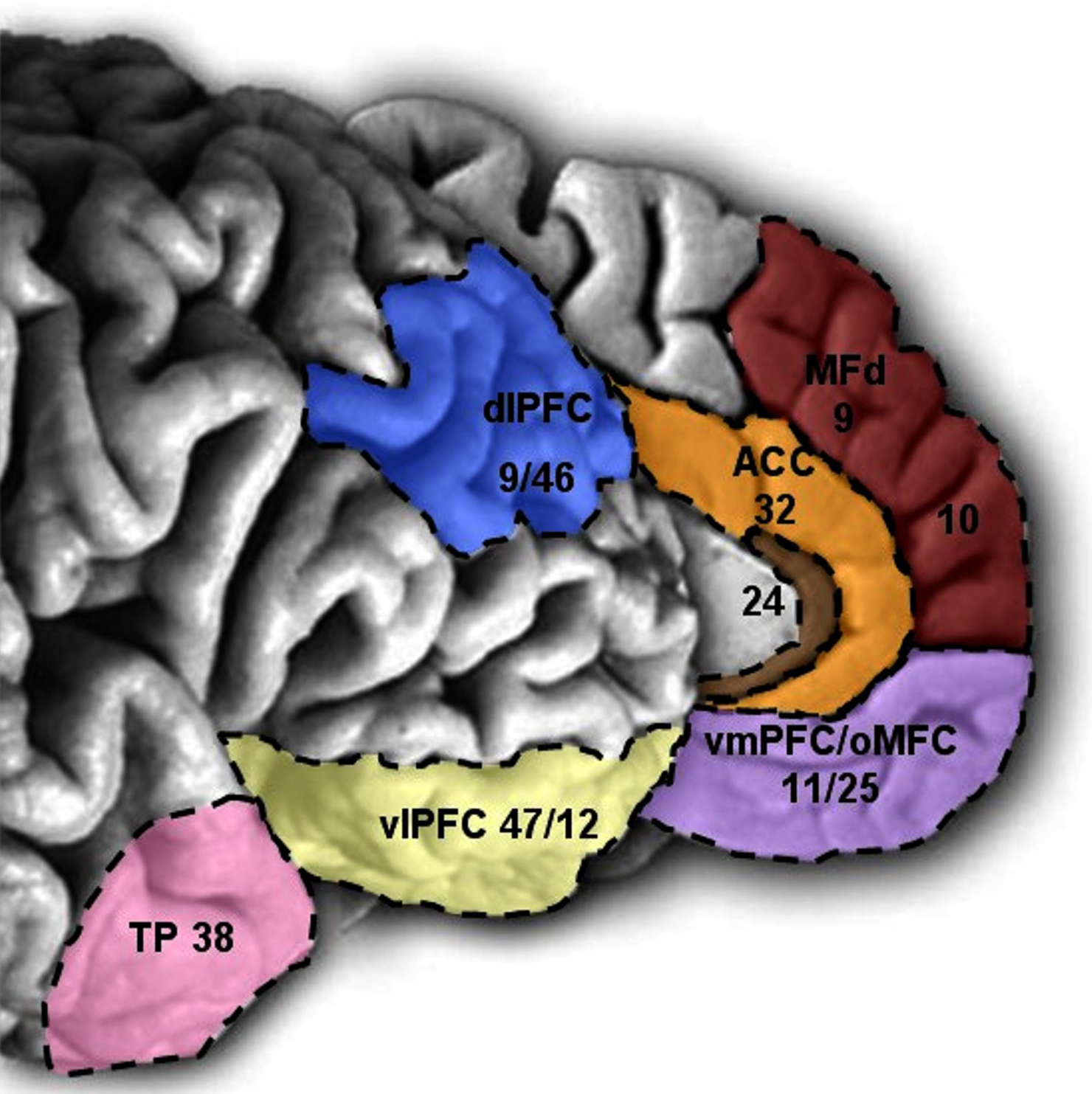
Medial and lateral view of the PFC

Neuroscience research solidified the shared roles of simulation theory and theory theory in empathic accuracy.

Neuroscience work on empathy focused on two main neural networks: the mirror system and the mentalizing system. The mirror system involves the bilateral posterior ventrolateral prefrontal cortex and bilateral anterior inferior parietal lobule. It is a more automatic form of shared mental representation, and so corresponds with simulation theory. The mentalizing system involves areas dependent upon task demands but converges in the dorsomedial prefrontal cortex.

These systems rely on separate neural regions and can be activated at the same time. Recent work on empathic accuracy shows this concurrent activation, providing further evidence that empathic accuracy involves both processes. It follows as well that the difficulty of the task would differentially activate the two networks; more basic tasks such as simple emotion recognition through facial expression correlate with greater activation of the mirror system, while tasks that require more complex social judgments to assess another's state activate the mentalizing system to a greater degree.

=== Measurement ===
William Ickes and colleagues developed a method to measure the accuracy of a perceiver's inferences about the content of a target person's reported thoughts and feelings. In this method, the perceiver is asked to view a videotaped interaction that was previously recorded. The videotape is paused for the perceiver at each of the points at which a target person on the videotape had reported having a specific thought or feeling, and the perceiver's writes down the thought or feeling content that the perceiver infers. Because the researchers have a list of the thoughts and feelings that the target reported having at the various "stop points," they can compare the content of each inferred thought or feeling with the reported thought or feeling and assess the level of the perceiver's empathic accuracy.

This method has been adapted for neuroscience research by including fMRI scanning of participants while watching videos of others. Participants then report perceived emotional states of the recorded individual while the participants are in the scanner, so that researchers can measure brain activity during the empathic accuracy task.

In some research on psychotherapy, audio- and videotapes record the sessions of a patient and therapist, which allows expert judges to rate the "empathic responsivity" or empathic accuracy of the therapist towards the patient.

== Research ==
=== Social psychology ===
Social psychology research focuses on how empathic accuracy affects interpersonal relationships, and how people differ in empathic accuracy ability. Closeness improves empathic accuracy; in a study of friends, for example, men were better at reading their friends' emotional states than those of strangers. In romantic relationships, empathic accuracy is higher when couples feel stable in their relationships than not. This suggests that people may inaccurately interpret partners' states when they feel threatened, such as when evaluating whether a partner is physically attracted to someone else. In healthy relationships, empathic accuracy is linked to better instrumental social support: partners who are more accurate at inferring their partners' states are also better at providing tangible, concrete supports such as material goods or financial assistance.

Work on empathic inaccuracy and aggression toward spouses has shown that men who are more likely to be aggressive toward their wives are also less accurate at reading emotional states of women who they do not know, and more likely to inaccurately label those women's states as critical or rejecting, suggesting a basic cognitive bias within these men. Research looking explicitly at partners found the same trend, with men who have acted violently toward their partners performing poorly when identifying their partners' emotional states.

Research on gender differences has been mixed, with effects mainly showing up when participants are made aware of gender-role expectations and of the fact that empathy is being measured. These findings suggest that men and women are no different in empathic accuracy skill, but that social norms can impact men's performance. Research with opposite-gender couples found significant differences between genders: women were better at reading their partner's emotions. These differences, however, were dramatically diminished when the couples were told that they would receive money for each emotion they correctly identified in their partner. Men and women are very similar, according to these results, in terms of skill, but differ in terms of motivation to be empathetic.

=== Social neuroscience ===
Social neuroscience has located regions of the brain correlated with empathic accuracy, which helped clarify the debate regarding simulation theory and theory-theory. Other research in social neuroscience has explored processes that may affect empathic accuracy both behaviorally and in the brain. One such study looked at the relationship between oxytocin and empathic accuracy. Oxytocin, known for its role in regulating prosocial behavior, selectively improved the empathic accuracy of those individuals who scored higher on the Autism Spectrum Quotient (AQ), meaning that increased levels of oxytocin helped people with poorer social skills but not those who were already socially skilled.

Neuroscience methods have also been used to explore how compassion meditation relates to empathic accuracy. Compassion meditation, also referred to as Mettā or loving-kindness meditation, is a Buddhist practice in which the meditator focuses on increasing empathic feelings and compassion toward others. When study participants were trained in an eight-week course on compassion meditation, they were found to be more empathically accurate than controls and showed corresponding increased brain activation in areas related to empathic accuracy, particularly the mentalizing system.

==== Deficits ====
Certain conditions can impair empathic accuracy. Alexithymia, which involves difficulty with labeling one's own emotional states, is linked with empathic inaccuracy. When considering the importance of the mirror system in empathic accuracy this deficit makes sense, as people who have difficulty recognizing their own emotions likely would show less brain activation in those regions, which are also used in recognizing others' emotions. Indeed, alexithymic individuals show decreased activation of the mirror system when presented with images of others.

Deficits in empathic accuracy have also been found in individuals on the autism spectrum. Higher AQ scores correlate with lower empathic accuracy in normal populations. Similar findings have been found in clinical populations, with those on the autism spectrum experiencing greater difficulty with empathic accuracy tasks.

== See also ==
- Empathy
- Interpersonal accuracy
- Mentalization
- Mirror system
- Role-taking theory (perspective-taking)
- Simulation theory of empathy
- Theory of mind
- Theory-theory
