= Gender empathy gap =

Theory in psychology

A gender empathy gap, sometimes referred to as an gender empathy bias, is a gendered breakdown or difference in empathy either a difference in social empathy towards people in similar conditions depending of the gender (like tolerating more violence against men), differences in empathy towards gendered topics (like men caring less for gender bias against women) or differences in empathic characteristics in averages of individuals within genders like measures of individual ability, behavior, mind processes or specific results related to empathizing. Empathy does not refer to a single metric but is related to many psychological and sociological concepts related to understanding or sympathizing with other feelings and thoughts. When accounting for gender these differences are investigated in different domains from the perspective of individual differences like in the basic ability of understanding others, personality traits related to pro-social attitudes, specific scales about interest in other's feelings and differences in reaction of people in distress but empathy also refers to general differences in how broader society or people of a specific gender reacts about individuals of a gender or general gender related topics in given situations which can be intersectionalized with differences in empathy related to other identities (like people tolerating more punishments for black men than do for both white men or black women). Empathy gaps may occur due to a failure in the process of empathizing based on gender of either the person who should be empathizing or the person in need of empathy or as a consequence of stable personality characteristics, and differences in empathic behavior may reflect either a lack of ability or motivation to empathize.

== Empathy in different genders ==
=== Empathy perception ===
Studies have consistently found that women report higher levels of empathy than men. According to some studies, females may recognize facial expressions and emotions more accurately and quickly than males, particularly in interpreting neutral body language. Additionally, females tend to recognize male expressions of anger more accurately, while males may better recognize female expressions of happiness.

Gender differences in empathy have also been observed in other species, including gorillas, rats, and corvids, with females generally showing higher levels of empathetic behavior than males.

A systematic review examining gender differences in empathy among medical students found that female students consistently exhibited higher empathy levels than their male counterparts. This review included 30 studies with diverse sample sizes and geographic representation, increasing the robustness of its findings. Researchers have hypothesized that females' empathetic performance may be influenced by motivation—suggesting that when women perceive a situation as requiring empathy, they tend to perform better, but may otherwise show no significant difference from men.

Females also tend to score higher on "theory of mind" assessments. A large-scale study of over 300,000 participants across 57 countries found that women outperformed men on the widely used "Reading the Mind in the Eyes" test, which measures cognitive empathy.

From birth, male and female infants respond differently to emotional stimuli. Female neonates are more likely to cry when hearing other infants cry, and they make more eye contact than male infants. Some researchers believe that these early differences in responsiveness and eye contact may contribute to the development of stronger empathic skills in females over time.

Many studies show that females have an on-average advantage in empathic accuracy skills.

=== Empathy reception ===
==== Positive bias toward women ====
The women-are-wonderful effect is a well-documented psychological phenomenon describing the tendency of both men and women to view women more positively than men, particularly in terms of warmth, empathy, and morality. First introduced by social psychologists Alice Eagly and Antonio Mladinic in the early 1990s, the effect has been replicated across cultures and is considered a foundational mechanism contributing to the gender empathy gap.

==== Implications for empathy ====
This favorable bias increases the likelihood of empathizing with women more readily than with men. When women are perceived as more vulnerable or morally deserving, their suffering may be interpreted as more serious or urgent. This can result in:

- Greater emotional support and concern for female victims
- Increased moral outrage when women are harmed
- Higher willingness to help or defend women in ambiguous situations
- Greater support for government policies targeting women falling behind compared to policies targeting men falling behind.

A 2019 study published in Psychology of Men & Masculinity found that both male and female participants were significantly more likely to feel compassion for a physically injured female subject than for a male subject in the same scenario.

A 2025 study on 35,000 Americans found that both men and women consider males falling behind to be less deserving of support than females falling behind because they are more likely to believe that males fall behind due to lack of effort.

== Sexism ==
Two studies examined responses to sexual assault research, particularly focusing on how hostile sexism predicts skepticism. In the first study, U.S. men were surveyed about their sexism levels and then asked about their skepticism towards different research summaries. Hostile sexism was found to strongly correlate with doubt towards sexual assault statistics, more so than towards other topics like breast cancer or alcohol abuse. The second study tested if self-affirmation could mitigate this skepticism but found it ineffective. This suggests that deeper educational strategies might be necessary to address biases that dismiss sexual assault research due to sexist views.

Other literature also shows that both males and females can sometimes exhibit benevolent sexism. When negative stereotypes are held on the basis of sex or gender this is known as hostile sexism.

Studies suggest that sexism and gender roles impact mental health outcomes as males are discouraged from appearing weak which impacts health seeking behaviour in males as they struggle to conform to gender roles where vulnerability is discouraged.

== Cultural differences in Empathy ==
=== Individualistic vs Collectivistic Cultures ===
Empathy can be described as the capacity to sympathize and understand others point of view. As different cultural backgrounds have different prosocial behavior, it's important to highlight the difference within individualistic cultures and collectivistic cultures in terms of gendered empathy. Key characteristics of both frameworks is how each ideology have different emphases in relation to self to others. Individualistic cultures tend to prioritize the self based on personal interest and gaining. While Collectivistic cultures tend to put others needs first rather than themselves. A study done in 63 countries have found that, those who generally have a higher collectivistic environment have reported to overall have show more agreeableness, self-esteem, even in cognitive and affective empathy.

== See also ==
- Gender and emotional expression
- Sex differences in emotional intelligence
