= Video recall =

Video recall in psychology is a research procedure used by clinicians to obtain an individual’s subjective understanding of their own interactions with others.

The procedure involves recording the participants’ interaction with another person and then asking them to review the video while providing feedback about their own interactions, behaviors, and experiences. Subjective understanding includes an individual’s affective and cognitive understandings of an interpersonal event. Often the participants’ ratings are contrasted with the ratings of trained coders and researchers who also observe the video.

== History of video recall ==
Video recall was first used in research studies over 40 years ago. However, the procedure has only been widely used for the past 20 years due to significant advances in technology. Twenty years ago, analog videotape players were a big advancement in technology, allowing for video recall to become more popular. Even though they were better than the previous technology used, they had many disadvantages. Analog videotape players required a large amount of equipment, significant training, large amounts of space for storage, were slow, and were prone to malfunction.

With the movement towards digital technology, these disadvantages soon disappeared, causing video recall techniques to be much more appealing to researchers and clinicians. Furthermore, changes in psychological theory have led to the increased use of video recall. For example, family psychologists now place an increased value on individuals’ meanings and emotional perspectives, causing video recall to be an extremely useful procedure.

== Procedures ==
All video-recall studies involve recording participants' conversations in either a clinical or research setting, and having the participant or participants review the footage in any number of ways. There are three primary types of video-recall procedures that vary in multiple ways. Different methods are better suited for different research questions, and a combination of the three types may be used.

=== Continuous ===
Continuous video-recall procedures provide consistent, quantifiable data and are often used in marital studies. In this type of study, participants review video footage and rate their conversations on a single affective dimension. This may be done with a computerized joystick or a rating dial and it allows for continuous feedback.

This method provides a very brief segment length (often 10 seconds), and thus gives precise analyses of interactions within a conversation. While this method only allows participants to evaluate one dimension of affect, it takes the least time of the three methods because it does not require the footage to be repeatedly paused.

=== Semistructured ===
When semistructured video-recall procedures are used, the footage is paused at short intervals (typically every 20–30 seconds) during which time participants vocalize what they were thinking or feeling during the segment. These narrations are often recorded for later reference.

An alternative method involves allowing the participant to pause the recording and reflect whenever they have input instead of at standardized intervals. Semistructured procedures allow for more in-depth analysis of affect, but do not translate well for data analysis. They are, however, more useful in a clinical context than the other two procedures.

=== Code-specific ===
Code-specific video-recall procedures provide quantifiable data on multiple affective measures. Video footage is paused at set intervals (typically 15–30 seconds), at which time participants rate the interactions of themselves as well as their partners on a series of dimensions that are relevant to the research question at hand. T

his method allows for subjective measurement of many different perceived factors as well as examination of both oneself as well as one's partner or family members. However, code-specific procedures take more time than the other methods, as the video must be repeatedly paused for substantial periods of time.

== Potential Applications of Video Recall ==
Video recall is used in a variety of psychological settings. No one procedure is universally appropriate or applicable, so it is important to match specific techniques to specific cases.

=== Psychotherapy ===
Video recall is commonly used in psychotherapy for both counseling and instruction. A therapist will record an interview or conversation with a patient, and play it back to them through different procedural means. Sometimes the patient will narrate their inner thoughts or attribution, while other times they will fill out surveys or answer questions at different intervals.

A metanalysis of clinical technique of video recall suggested that this method is most effective for families with small children; parents learn successful rearing styles from their own mistakes caught on film. This analysis also suggested that video recall is more successful with skill-learning and instruction than coping mechanisms. However, a successful use of video recall in a therapeutic session is the recording of a conversation between two family members or friends; both will measure their responses while watching, and comparing answers can yield successful results.

Video recall is also a tool that therapists use to understand their patients. The therapist will record a typical conversation either in the patient's day to day encounters or between the patient and the therapist, and the patient will narrate their understanding of the situation. This is a tool used to overcome cultural barriers.

=== Observation and Intervention ===
Observational and interventional methods of video recall are most often used in experimental measures of attribution, emotion and social interaction. Video recall is extremely useful because it can measure patterns in both everyday situations and experimental settings in a less intrusive way than a round table discussion.

Video recall can be useful in both group and individual settings. Recall can also measure changes between gender, age, and other demographic factors, as it allows for specific time-stamping: it contains both quick reactions and long-term feelings. In Welsh's 2005 study of different techniques of video recall, he cites "social constructionism, attachment theory, cognitive–behavioral theories, and symbolic interactionism as theories that are commonly measured through video recall. Much can be inferred from the relationship between cognitive processes and actual events, as it allows for more personalized coding and measurement.

== Validity ==
Validity is an important aspect of video recall. It is crucial that the researcher provides clear instruction about what specific parts of the video the subject should measure. For example, if a researcher is studying attribution, they should make clear whether the subject should measure their feelings in the past or present, which perspective they should take, and when to measure certain parts. Delay can be an issue in continuous settings, as subjects may react at different times due to a number of factors. However, Gottman's 1985 study on the use of continuous technique suggested that delay may not change overall effects.

A way to ensure validity is to utilize inter and intra-rater reliability methods, including time-series analysis. This involves the use of multiple methods at a time. A commonly used method that works alongside video recall is various physiological measures, like heart rate, pulse, cortisol sampling, ACT and skin conductance This ensures that rating is consistent.
