= Simulation theory =

Simulation theory or Simulation Theory may refer to:

- Simulation theory of empathy, a theory in philosophy of mind about how people read others' actions and intentions
- Simulation hypothesis, a theory that all of perceived reality is an artificial simulation
- Simulation Theory (album), a 2018 album by Muse

== See also ==
- Simulacra and Simulation, a 1981 philosophical treatise by Jean Baudrillard
