= Interpersonal accuracy =

Concept of psychology

In psychology, interpersonal accuracy (IPA) refers to an individual's ability to make correct inferences about others' internal states, traits, or other personal attributes. For example, a person who is able to correctly recognize emotions, motivation, or thoughts in others demonstrates interpersonal accuracy. IPA is an important skill in everyday life and is related to many positive social interaction outcomes.

== Definition ==
Different terms have been used in the literature in the past (e.g., interpersonal sensitivity, empathic accuracy, mind reading, and judgmental accuracy) to describe the ability to make correct inferences about others. Also, emotion recognition ability (ERA) or emotion perception ability is part of IPA. But, IPA is much broader than just correctly assessing others' emotions. IPA encompasses the accurate assessment of others' traits (e.g., personality, intelligence, or sexual orientation) and states (e.g., thoughts, emotions, or motivations) and accurate assessment of interpersonal relationships (e.g., level of intimacy between two people or hierarchical status among two or more people) as well as social group characteristics (e.g., religion, political orientation, or psychopathology).

The correlations between these different IPA domains are positive but modest, suggesting that IPA is a multifaceted and heterogeneous construct. In some domains, especially personality judgment, researchers measure behavioral and appearance cues to understand how accuracy is achieved and to identify cues that perceivers might miss or use inappropriately. Sometimes, accurately remembering information about others (e.g., their nonverbal behavior or their appearance), called recall accuracy, and remembering one's own nonverbal behavior (nonverbal self-accuracy) is subsumed under the label of IPA. In the social perception field, IPA is mostly conceptualized as a skill as it increases during childhood and adolescence, continues to change across adulthood, and can be trained. When averaged across people, group comparisons can be made (e.g., gender differences or cultural comparisons).

== IPA and social interaction outcomes ==
Research has shown that people who are high in IPA tend to have more socially desirable personality traits (e.g., empathy, extraversion, or tolerance) and fewer socially undesirable personality traits (e.g., neuroticism or shyness) and are generally more mentally healthy. In addition, people who demonstrate IPA are perceived as more cooperative and more likable. People who are high in IPA, therefore, seem better equipped for social interactions than the ones who are low in IPA. Indeed, IPA is linked to positive outcomes in various contexts such as clinical settings (e.g., physicians who are higher in IPA have more satisfied patients), education (e.g., IPA is related to positive learning outcomes on both the teacher and the learner side), or the workplace (e.g., IPA is positively related to work performance) —contexts in which social interactions are omnipresent.

The origins of IPA are not well understood, as little prospective research has been done and most evidence is correlational (i.e., based on cross-sectional data). Research suggests that formative experiences including family environment and attachment could play a role. For instance, dysfunctional parenting is associated with children who have higher IPA. Motivational factors, either short-term or long-term, as well as various requirements of work and social life also play a part. Although IPA shows modest correlations with cognitive intelligence, it is not merely the product of higher overall intelligence.
