= William Ickes =

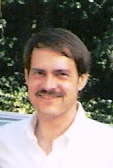
- Born: 1947 (age 78–79)
- Education: University of Texas at Austin
- Known for: Empathic accuracy
- Scientific career
- Fields: Personality and social psychology
- Workplaces: University of Texas at Arlington
- Doctoral advisors: Elliot Aronson; Robert Wicklund

William Ickes (born 1947) is an American personality and social psychologist who is known primarily for his research on unstructured dyadic interaction. His first major line of research within this tradition concerns the phenomenon of empathic accuracy ("everyday mind reading"). This research is summarized in his 2003 book Everyday Mind Reading: Understanding What Other People Think and Feel. His second major line of research concerns the influence of personal traits and characteristics on people's initial interactions with each other. This research is summarized in his 2009 book Strangers in a Strange Lab: How Personality Shapes Our Initial Encounters with Others.

== Background ==
Ickes received his Ph.D. in Experimental Psychology in 1973 at the University of Texas at Austin, where he was trained in the social psychology program. His primary research advisor was Robert Wicklund, although Elliot Aronson was also an important professional mentor during this time. Ickes's first academic job was at the University of Wisconsin–Madison, where he initiated the research on unstructured dyadic interaction that he would continue to do throughout his academic career. After leaving Wisconsin, he taught briefly at the University of Missouri-St. Louis (1979–1982). He returned to Texas in 1982 to begin his employment at the University of Texas at Arlington, where he has been for over 30 years. He was a visiting professor at the University of Washington in 1992; a Visiting Erskine Fellow at the University of Canterbury in Christchurch, New Zealand in 1999; and an International Francqui Chair at Ghent University and the Catholic University of Louvain-la-Neuve, Belgium, in 2005.

== Empathic accuracy (everyday mind reading) ==
Ickes has published widely on the topic of empathic accuracy, both alone and in collaboration with various colleagues. The study of empathic accuracy has become an important subfield at the interface of two larger fields of study: research on empathy and research on accuracy in interpersonal perception. Much of the available research on this topic is summarized in two books: Empathic Accuracy (1997) and Everyday Mind Reading (2003).

Ickes's books and articles on empathic accuracy currently comprise about 60 publications. His research has helped to answer several important questions about “everyday mind reading.” Do women display greater empathic accuracy than men? The answer is that on some occasions they do, but primarily because of greater empathic motivation rather than greater empathic ability. Do friends display greater empathic accuracy than strangers? The answer is yes, because friends have shared more of their experiences—both directly and indirectly via their discussions—than strangers have, and therefore know each other's minds better. Do abusive husbands display an impaired ability to "read" their wives' thoughts and feelings? The answer is yes, and abusive husbands do not show a similar deficit in “reading” the thoughts and feelings of other men's wives. Does our empathic accuracy depend more on the words other people use and how they say them, or on their nonverbal behavior such as their facial expressions and body postures? The answer is that when all of these sources of information are available, our empathic accuracy generally depends most on what other people say, next-most on their paralinguistic cues (the pitch, inflection, and amplitude of their voice, for example), and least on their nonverbal behaviors.

To explore the motivational aspects of empathic accuracy, William Ickes and Jeffry Simpson proposed their empathic accuracy model, which is perhaps the most influential theory in this area of research. In this model, they argued that although greater empathic accuracy usually enhances people's relationships, there are occasions when people are motivated to be empathically inaccurate and avoid knowing what their relationship partner is thinking and feeling. The phenomenon of motivated inaccuracy that was introduced in the model has been substantiated in a number of studies and has been linked to both avoidant and anxious-ambivalent attachment styles.

In another important and long-term collaboration, William Ickes was involved in the series of studies that Lesley Verhofstadt and her Belgian colleagues conducted on the role of empathic accuracy in the social support displayed by married couples. Their findings showed that empathic accuracy is useful in identifying the particular kind of support that one's partner needs, so that the “right” type and amount of support can be provided.

In 2008, Ickes published the chapter "Mind-Reading Superheroes: Fiction and Fact" in an edited book titled The Psychology of Superheroes. After comparing the mind reading that fictional superheroes do with the mind reading that lesser mortals do in their everyday lives, he concluded that "For me, science doesn't spoil the wonder of mind reading: it deepens and enhances it. And speaking of life's many wonders, who would have thought that the kid who read so many comics about superheroes back in the 1950s would grow up to be The Man Who Measured Mind Reading? I never would have thought it, but the wonder of it all is that I was that kid!" (p. 133)

== Personality influences on strangers' interactions ==
Using the unstructured dyadic interaction paradigm, Ickes and his colleagues have explored the influences of many personal characteristics and personality traits on the interactions between strangers. More specifically, they have examined the influences of such personal characteristics as the participants' gender, their birth order, their race/ethnicity, and their physical attractiveness. They have also examined the effects of various personality traits such as androgyny, the Big Five personality traits, shyness, and self-monitoring. This research is summarized in Strangers in a Strange Lab (2009).

== Other contributions ==
In addition to his work on empathic accuracy, Ickes has made a broader contribution to the study of intersubjective social cognition. His 1994 article with Richard Gonzalez was the first to draw a strong distinction between subjective social cognition, which occurs entirely in one person's mind and concerns either imagined, reflected-upon, or anticipated interaction, and intersubjective social cognition, which occurs during an actual, ongoing social interaction and involves the intersubjective experience of the interaction partners. Subsequent papers have elaborated this distinction, which owes much to the existentialist influence of writers such as Alfred Schütz and Maurice Merleau-Ponty.

Similarly, Ickes's development of a method for measuring empathic accuracy is only part of his broader contribution in applying innovative methods to the study of naturalistic social cognition. Some of these methods enable the assessment and content analysis of the actual thoughts and feelings that interaction partners report, and they also permit an exploration of the intersubjective themes that characterize the interactions of different dyad types. In addition, by comparing the linguistic content of people's self-reported thoughts with the linguistic content of their self-reported feelings, Ickes and Cheng (2011) were able to delineate several ways in which thoughts differ from feelings. In more recent research, Ickes and his colleagues have studied how latent semantic similarity (LSS) develops in dyadic interactions.

Ickes's interest in personality is also evident in the various personality measures that he and his colleagues have developed. These measures assess the constructs of adherence to conventional morality, internal-external correspondence, self-motivation, social absorption and social individuation, and strength of sense of self. More recently, he and his colleagues have developed other measures to assess the constructs of thin-skinned ego-defensiveness, affect intensity for anger and frustration, and rudeness. They have also published psychometric articles on (a) the pitfalls of using item variance as a measure of "traitedness" and (b) the reduction in internal consistency that results from inter-item "context switching."

In collaboration with William Schweinle and other colleagues, William Ickes participated in an extensive study of the psychology of maritally aggressive men. Over the course of four studies, Schweinle, Ickes, and their colleagues found that maritally aggressive men are especially inaccurate when inferring their own wives' thoughts and feelings, and that a major source of this deficit is their biased belief that women harbor critical and rejecting thoughts and feelings about their male partners. This biased perception of women as being critical and rejecting appears to help justify the men's marital aggression in their own minds, and it is a bias that they seek to preserve through tactics such as disattending a women's complaints and reacting to such communications with feelings of contempt rather than sympathy. In general, maritally aggressive men appear to be angry, egocentric individuals. For some of these men, marital abuse is the product of a sudden impulse; for others, it is the product of a built-up resentment that has its origin in the biased perception that women harbor critical and rejecting thoughts and feelings about their male partners. These findings have clearcut implications for the treatment of abusive behavior in maritally aggressive men.

Finally, Ickes developed a theory of how people's sex roles (gender roles) affect their behavior and experience in initial interactions. The impact of this theory has so far been quite limited, perhaps because it did not receive much attention when the original version of the theory was published in 1981. Ironically, however, a spin-off article titled "Traditional Gender Roles: Do They Make, and then Break, our Relationships?" has been read and/or downloaded more than 10,000 times from the ResearchGate website.

Ickes has, to date, written or co-authored more than 180 publications, which include books, book chapters, journal articles, commentaries, and reviews. Along with John H. Harvey and Robert F. Kidd, he was a co-editor of the three-volume series New Directions in Attribution Research.

== Books ==
Ickes has published two single-authored books:

- Everyday Mind Reading: Understanding What Other People Think and Feel (2003)
- Strangers in a Strange Lab: How Personality Shapes Our Initial Encounters with Others (2009)

He has also published several edited (or co-edited) books:

- Harvey, J., Ickes, W., & Kidd, R. (Eds.) (1976). New directions in attribution research. Vol. 1. Hillsdale, NJ: Erlbaum.
- Harvey, J., Ickes, W., & Kidd, R. (Eds.) (1978). New directions in attribution research. Vol. 2. Hillsdale, NJ: Erlbaum.
- Harvey, J., Ickes, W., & Kidd, R. (Eds.) (1981). New directions in attribution research. Vol. 3. Hillsdale, NJ: Erlbaum.
- Ickes, W., & Knowles, E.S. (Eds.) (1982). Personality, roles, and social behavior. New York: Springer-Verlag.
- Ickes, W. (Ed.) (1985). Compatible and incompatible relationships. New York: Springer-Verlag.
- Duck, S.W., Hay, D.F., Hobfoll, S.E., Ickes, W., & Montgomery, B., (Eds.), (1988). Handbook of personal relationships: Theory, research, and interventions (1st ed.). Chichester, UK: Wiley.
- Duck, S.W., Dindia, K., Ickes, W., Milardo, R.M., Mills, R., & Sarason, B. (Eds.) (1997). Handbook of personal relationships: Theory, research, and interventions (2nd ed.). Chichester, UK: Wiley.
- Ickes, W. (Ed.) (1997). Empathic accuracy. New York: Guilford Press.
- Decety, J., & Ickes, W. (Eds.) (2009). The social neuroscience of empathy. Cambridge, MA: MIT Press.
- Smith, J.L., Ickes, W., Hall, J., & Hodges, S.D. (Eds.). (2011). Managing interpersonal sensitivity: Knowing when—and when not—to understand others. New York: Nova Science.
