= Interpersonal Reactivity Index =

Psychological measure of empathy

The Interpersonal Reactivity Index (IRI) is a published measurement tool for the multi-dimensional assessment of empathy. It was developed by Mark H. Davis, a professor of psychology at Eckerd College.

== Format and content ==
The IRI is a self-report comprising 28-items answered on a 5-point Likert scale ranging from "Does not describe me well" to "Describes me very well".

The IRI was designed to measure a set of four clearly discriminable constructs that each concern responsivity to others, rather than treating empathy as a single characteristic. The four subscales are:

- Perspective Taking – the tendency to spontaneously adopt the psychological point of view of others.
- Fantasy – taps respondents' tendencies to transpose themselves imaginatively into the feelings and actions of fictitious characters in books, movies, and plays.
- Empathic Concern – assesses "other-oriented" feelings of sympathy and concern for unfortunate others.
- Personal Distress – measures "self-oriented" feelings of personal anxiety and unease in tense interpersonal settings.

Example questions:

- 11. I sometimes try to understand my friends better by imagining how things look from their perspective.
- 28. Before criticizing somebody, I try to imagine how I would feel if I were in their place.

In a 2019 review of empathy research, Hall and Schwartz note that the IRI does not directly assess several other phenomena commonly associated with empathy, including sharing another person’s emotions, accurately perceiving their mental states, and behaving empathically. Reniers and colleagues questioned whether the Personal Distress subscale measures empathy, arguing that its items assess respondents’ own reactions to emergency situations.

== Impact ==
In a 2019 review of empathy research, Hall and Schwartz identified the IRI as the most frequently used empathy instrument among the studies they examined. The paper describing IRI, published in the Journal of Personality and Social Psychology in 1983, has (as of November 2026) been cited over 17,000 times, according to Google Scholar.

== Versatility and Adaptability ==
A study by De Corte et al. (2007) translated the IRI into Dutch. The researchers found that their translation is just as valid and reliable as Davis's original version, albeit in their educated, still Westernized sample.

Another study by Péloquin and Lafontaine (2010) adapted the IRI to specifically measure empathy in couples rather than individuals. This was achieved by rewording some phrases used in the original, for example replacing references to "people" and "somebody" to be "my partner," etc. Several couples were also asked to return after twelve months to be re-evaluated. This new version still adequately measured empathy as well as demonstrated predictive validity in the returning couples, correlating relationship satisfaction and each partner's empathy.

Garcia-Barrera, Karr, Trujillo-Orrego, Trujillo-Orrego, and Pineda (2017) translated and modified the IRI into a Colombian Spanish version. This version was used to measure empathy in Colombian militants returning to society after having seen combat. The study encountered more difficulty in obtaining valid and reliable findings than previous studies. They attributed this difficulty largely due to the lack of education of the participants, which resulted in the introspective and abstract items of the IRI being difficult to understand.
