= Role-taking theory =

Social-psychological concept

Role-taking theory (or social perspective taking) is the social-psychological concept that one of the most important factors in facilitating social cognition in children is the growing ability to understand others’ feelings and perspectives, an ability that emerges as a result of general cognitive growth. Part of this process requires that children come to realize that others’ views may differ from their own. Role-taking ability involves understanding the cognitive and affective (i.e. relating to moods, emotions, and attitudes) aspects of another person's point of view, and differs from perceptual perspective-taking, which is the ability to recognize another person's visual point of view of the environment. Furthermore, albeit some mixed evidence on the issue, role-taking and perceptual perspective-taking seem to be functionally and developmentally independent of each other.

Robert Selman is noted for emphasizing the importance of this theory within the field of cognitive development. He argues that a matured role-taking ability allows us to better appreciate how our actions will affect others, and if we fail to develop the ability to role-take, we will be forced to erroneously judge that others are behaving solely as a result of external factors. One of Selman's principal additions to the theory has been an empirically supported developmental theory of role-taking ability.

Social cognitive research on children's thoughts about others’ perspectives, feelings, and behaviors has emerged as one of the largest areas of research in the field. Role-taking theory can provide a theoretical foundation upon which this research can rest and be guided by and has relations and applications to numerous other theories and topics.

== Selman's developmental theory ==
Robert Selman developed his developmental theory of role-taking ability based on four sources. The first is the work of M. H. Feffer (1959, 1971), and Feffer and Gourevitch (1960), which related role-taking ability to Piaget's theory of social decentering, and developed a projective test to assess children's ability to decenter as they mature. The second is the research of John H. Flavell (1968), which studied children's growing abilities to judge other people's conceptual and perceptual perspectives. The third is the developmental ideas of differentiation, whereupon one learns to distinguish his/her perspective from the perspectives of others, and integration, the ability to relate one's perspective to the perspectives of others. The final source of influence comes from Selman's own previous research where he assessed children's ability to describe the different perspectives of characters in a story.

One example of Selman's stories is that of Holly and her father. Children are told about Holly, an avid 8-year-old tree climber. One day, Holly falls off a tree, but does not hurt herself. Holly's father sees this and makes Holly promise that she will stop climbing trees, and Holly promises. Later, however, Holly and her friends meet Shawn, a boy whose kitten is stuck in a tree. Holly is the only one amongst her friends who can climb trees well enough to save Shawn's kitten, who may fall at any moment, but she remembers the promise she made with her father. Selman then goes on to ask children about the perspectives of Holly and her father, and each stage is associated with typical responses.

=== Stages ===
==== Level 0: Egocentric Role Taking ====
Level 0 (ages 3–6, roughly) is characterized by two lacking abilities. The first is the failure to distinguish perspectives (differentiation). More specifically, the child is unable to distinguish between his perspective, including his perspective on why a social action occurred, and that of others. The second ability the child lacks is relating perspectives (social integration).

In the Holly dilemma, children tend to respond that Holly will save the kitten and that the father will not mind Holly's disobedience because he will be happy and he likes kittens. In actuality, the child is displaying his/her inability to separate his/her liking for kittens from the perspectives of Holly and her father.

==== Level 1: Subjective role taking ====
At level 1 (ages 6–8, roughly), children now recognize that they and others in a situation may have different information available to them, and thus may differ in their views. In other words, children have matured in differentiation. The child still significantly lacks integration ability, however: he/she cannot understand that his views are influenced by the views of others, and vice versa, ad infinitum. In addition, the child believes that the sole reason for differing social perspectives is because of different information, and nothing else.

In the Holly dilemma, when asked if the father would be angry if he found out that Holly climbed the tree again, children might respond, “If he didn’t know why she climbed the tree, he would be angry. But if he knew why she did it, he would realize that she had a good reason,” not recognizing that the father may still be angry, regardless of her wanting to save the kitten, because of his own values, such as his concern for his daughter's safety.

==== Level 2: Self-reflective role taking ====
The child's differentiation ability matures at this level (ages 8–10, roughly) enough so that he/she understands that people can also differ in their social perspectives because of their particularly held and differing values and set of purposes. In turn, the child is able to better put him/herself in the position of another person. In terms of integration, the child can now understand that others think about his/her point of view too. This allows the child to predict how the other person might react to the child's behaviour. What is still lacking, however, is for the child to be able to consider another person's point of view and another person's point of view of the child simultaneously.

In the Holly dilemma, when children are asked if Holly will climb the tree, they will typically respond, “Yes. She knows that her father will understand why she did it.” This indicates the child is considering the father's perspective in light of Holly's perspective; however, when asked if the father would want Holly to climb the tree, children typically respond that he would not. This shows that the child is solely considering the father's point of view and his worry for Holly's safety.

==== Level 3: Mutual role taking ====
In level 3 (ages 10–12, roughly), the child can now differentiate his/her own perspective from the viewpoint likely for the average member of the group. In addition, the child can take the view of a detached third-person and view a situation from that perspective. In terms of integration, the child can now simultaneously consider his/her view of others and others’ view of the child, and the consequences of this feedback loop of perspectives in terms of behaviour and cognition.

In describing the result of the Holly dilemma, the child may take the perceptive of a detached third party, responding that “Holly wanted to get the kitten because she likes kittens, but she knew that she wasn’t supposed to climb trees. Holly’s father knew that Holly had been told not to climb trees, but he couldn’t have known about [the kitten].”

==== Level 4: Societal role taking ====
At level 4 (ages 12–15+, roughly), the adolescent now considers others’ perspectives with reference to the social environment and culture the other person comes from, assuming that the other person will believe and act in accord to their society's norms and values.

When asked if Holly deserves to be punished for her transgression, adolescents typically respond that Holly should not as her father should understand that we need to humanely treat animals.

=== Evidence for Selman's Stages ===
Three studies have been conducted to assess Selman's theory, all of which having shown support for his developmental outline of role-taking ability progression. Selman conducted the first study of his own theory using 60 middle-class children from ages 4 to 6. In this experiment, the children were asked to predict and explain their predictions about another child's behaviour in a certain situation. The child participants were given situational information not available to the child they were making behavioural and cognitive predictions about. Results implied a stage progression of role taking ability as a function of age, as theorized by Selman.

In a second assessment of the theory, Selman and D. F. Byrne interviewed 40 children, ages 4, 6, 8, and 10, on two socio-moral dilemmas. Children were required to discuss the perspectives of different characters in each dilemma, and results again showed that role taking ability progressed through stages as a function of age.

The third study assessing Selman's theory was a 5-year longitudinal study of 41 male children on their role taking ability. Results showed that 40 of the 41 children interviewed followed the stages as outlined by Selman and none skipped over a stage.

== Relation to other topics ==
=== Piaget's theory of cognitive development ===
Jean Piaget stressed the importance of play in children, especially play that involves role taking. He believed that role taking play in children promotes a more mature social understanding by teaching children to take on the roles of others, allowing them to understand that different people can have differing perspectives. In addition, Piaget argued that good solutions to interpersonal conflicts involve compromise which arises out of our ability to consider the points of view of others.

Two of Piaget's fundamental concepts have primarily influenced role taking theory:

1. egocentrism, the mode of thinking that characterizes preoperational thinking, which is the child's failure to consider the world from other points of view.
2. decentration, the mode of thinking that characterizes operational thinking, which is the child's growing ability to perceive the world with more than one perspective in mind.

In Piagetian theory, these concepts were used to describe solely cognitive development, but they have been applied in role taking theory to the social domain.

Evidence that Piaget's cognitive theories can be applied to the interpersonal aspects of role-taking theory comes from two sources. The first is empirical evidence that children's ability to role take is correlated to their IQ and performance on Piagetian tests. Secondly, the two theories have been conceptually linked in that Selman's role-taking stages correspond to Piaget's cognitive development stages, where preoperational children are at level 1 or 2, concrete operators are at level 3 or 4, and formal operators are at level 4 or 5 of Selman's stages. Given this relation, M. H. Feffer, as well as Feffer and V. Gourevitch, have argued that social role-taking is an extension of decentering in the social sphere. Selman has argued this same point, also noting that the growth of role-taking ability is brought on by the child's decreased egocentrism as he/she ages.

=== Kohlberg's stages of moral development ===
Lawrence Kohlberg argued that higher moral development requires role-taking ability. For instance, Kohlberg's conventional level of morality (between ages 9 and 13, roughly), involves moral stereotyping, empathy-based morality, alertness to and behaviour guided by predicted evaluations by others, and identifying with authority, all of which require role taking.

Selman tested 60 children, ages 8 to 10, on Kohlberg's moral-judgment measure and two role-taking tasks. He found that the development of role taking, within this age range, related to the progression into Kohlberg's conventional moral stage. A retest a year later confirmed Kohlberg's argument, and in general, it was shown that higher moral development at the conventional stage requires children's achieved ability at this age to reciprocally deal with their own and others’ perspectives. Mason and Gibbs (1993) found that moral judgment development, as measured by Kohlberg's theory, consistently related to role taking opportunities experienced after childhood in adolescence and adulthood. This finding supported Kohlberg's view that moral progress beyond his third stage necessitates contact with other perspectives, namely those of entire cultures or political groups, which individuals are likely to encounter as they become adolescents and adults and thus meet many different people in school and the workplace.

=== Relation between Kohlberg’s stages, Piaget’s theory, and Selman’s theory ===
Kohlberg and Piaget both emphasized that role taking ability facilitates moral development. Kohlberg argued that cognitive and role-taking development are required but not sufficient for moral development. In turn, he maintained that Piaget's cognitive developmental stages underlie Selman's role taking stages, which are subsequently fundamental to his own moral developmental stages. This predicts that cognition develops first, followed by the corresponding role taking stage, and finally the corresponding moral stage, and never the other way around.

Conceptually, the three processes have been tied together by Walker (1980). His reasoning is that cognitive development involves the progressive understanding of the environment as it is. Role-taking is a step upon this, which is the recognition that people each have their own subjective interpretation of the environment, including how they think about and behave towards other people. Moral development, the final step, is the grasping of how people should think and behave towards one another.

Evidence in support of this view comes first from three reviews which showed moderate correlations between Selman's role taking theory, Piaget's cognitive developmental stages, and Kohlberg's moral developmental stages. More evidence comes from Walker and Richards' (1979) finding that moral development to Kohlberg's stage 4 occurred only for those who already had early basic formal operations according to Piaget's developmental theory, and not for those in an earlier stage. Similarly, Paolitto's attempts to stimulate moral development worked only for subjects who already attained the corresponding role taking stage. Previous research has also shown that short role taking treatments, such as exposing subjects to the role taking reasoning of subjects in one stage higher, can lead to moral development. In more general demonstrations of this argument, Faust and Arbuthnot and other researchers have shown that moral development is most probable for subjects with higher cognitive development.

In a direct investigation of Kohlberg's necessary but not sufficient argument, Walker tested the hypothesis that only children who had attained both beginning formal operations and role taking stage 3 could progress to Kohlberg's moral stage 3. 146 grade 4-7 children participated in this study, and the results strongly supported the hypothesis, given that only children who had the beginning formal substage of cognitive development and role taking stage 3 progressed to moral stage 3. Further support came from the study's demonstration that a short role playing treatment stimulated progress in moral reasoning in a 6-week follow-up retest. Krebs and Gilmore also directly tested Kohlberg's necessary but not sufficient argument of moral development in 51 children, ages 5–14, for the first three stages of cognitive, role taking, and moral development. Results generally supported Kohlberg's view, but not as strongly, given that it was only demonstrated that cognitive development is a prerequisite for role taking development, and not for moral development. Based on these results, researchers have suggested that moral education programs underlain by Kohlberg's theory must first ensure that the prerequisite cognitive and role taking abilities have developed.

=== Prosocial behavior ===
Role-taking ability has been argued to be related to prosocial behaviours and feelings. Evidence for this claim has been found from many sources. Underwood and Moore (1982), for instance, have found that perceptual, affective, and cognitive perspective-taking are positively correlated with prosocial behaviour. Children trained to improve their role-taking ability subsequently become more generous, more cooperative, and more apprehensive to the needs of others in comparison to children who received no role taking training. Research has also shown that people who are good at role-taking have greater ability to sympathize with others. Overall, the picture is clear: prosocial behaviour is related to role taking ability development and social deviance is linked to egocentrism.

To study one reason for the link between role-taking ability and prosociality, second-grade children found to be either high or low in role-taking were instructed to teach two kindergartners on an arts and crafts task. Sixteen measures of prosocial behaviour were scored, and high and low role takers diverged on 8 of the measures, including several helping measures, providing options, and social problem solving. Analysis of the results showed that low role takers helped less than high role takers not because of a lack of wanting to help, but because of their poorer ability in interpreting social cues indicating the need for help. In other words, low role takers tended to only be able to recognize problems when they were made plainly obvious.

Role taking has also been related to empathy. Batson had participants listen to an interview of a woman going through hardship. He then instructed participants to imagine how she feels, or, to imagine how they would feel in her situation, and found that both conditions produced feelings of empathy. Schoenrade has found the same result, where imagining how a person in distress feels or how one would feel in that person's situation produces feelings of empathy.

Finally, many theorists, including Mead, Piaget, Asch, Heider, Deutsch, Madsen, and Kohlberg have theorized a relationship between cooperation and role taking ability. In one study, children's predisposition to cooperate was shown to strongly correlate with their affective role taking ability. Other researchers have also shown an indirect relationship between cooperation and role-taking capacity.

=== Social functioning ===
A child's ability to function in social relationships has been found to depend partially on his/her role-taking ability. For instance, researchers found that children poor in role-taking ability had greater difficulty in forming and sustaining social relationships, as well as receiving lower peer nominations. Davis (1983) found that role-taking ability was positively correlated with social understanding. In general, progress in role-taking ability has shown to be beneficial for one's personal and interpersonal life.

Better functioning in the interpersonal domain is particularly shown in the relation between role-taking ability and social problem solving ability. Role playing has been shown to improve male teenagers’ handling of social problem tasks. Gehlbach (2004) found a similar supporting result, demonstrating that adolescents with better role taking abilities had superior ability in conflict resolution. Many other researchers have also found that role taking ability development positively affects interpersonal problem solving skills. Additionally, role taking can promote better social functioning in the interpersonal domain through smoothening social interactions by improving behavioural mimicking ability.

Training children on role-taking ability can improve interpersonal functioning as well. In one study, preschoolers were made to role play interpersonal conflicts using puppets. Their task at the end was to discuss alternative solutions to the problems and how each solution would affect each character. Over the 10 weeks that the preschoolers participated in this role playing, their solutions became less aggressive and their classroom adjustment became better. Moreover, the use of role reversal in interpersonal problem situations has been found to stimulate cooperation, help participants better understand each other and each other's arguments and position, elicit new interpretations of the situation, change attitudes about the problem, and improve perceptions about the other person's efforts at solving the issue, willingness to compromise and cooperate, and trustworthiness. As a result of this research, it has been suggested that one way to improve cooperative skills is to improve affective role taking abilities.

Role-taking can also work to decrease prejudice and stereotyping. Importantly, the decrease in prejudice and stereotyping occurs for both the target individual and the target's group. In addition, role taking ability has been demonstrated to decrease social aggression.

== Applications ==
=== Attention Deficit Hyperactivity Disorder (ADHD) ===
Children with ADHD struggle in their social environments, but the social-cognitive reasons for this are unknown. Several studies have indicated a difference between children with and without ADHD on their role taking ability, wherein children with ADHD have lower role taking ability, lower role taking use, and slower role taking development than children without ADHD. Given these results, it has been suggested that children with ADHD be trained on role taking to improve their social skills, including their often comorbid oppositional and conduct problems.

=== Delinquency and social-skills training ===
The relationship between childhood and adolescent delinquency and role taking is considerable. Burack found that maltreated children and adolescents with behavioural problems exhibited egocentrism at higher levels than non-maltreated children and adolescents who had progressed faster and more expectedly in their role taking development. Chandler (1973) found that chronically delinquent boys exhibited lower role taking abilities so much so that their role taking ability was comparable to the role taking ability scores of non-delinquent children nearly half their age. In turn, one-third of the delinquent boys in this study were assigned to a treatment program designed to improve role taking skills. Post-treatment measures demonstrated that the program successfully induced role taking ability progress in this group, and an 18-month follow-up assessment found a nearly 50% decrease in delinquent behaviours following these progresses in role taking skills. The same has been found for delinquent girls. Chalmers and Townsend trained delinquent girls, ages 10–16, on role taking skills over 15 sessions, following which the girls demonstrated improved understanding of interpersonal situations and problems, greater empathy, more acceptance of individual differences, and exhibited more prosociality in the classroom. The overall picture, then, is that role-taking training can help delinquent youth and youth with conduct disorders as they lag behind in role-taking ability.

=== Autism ===
Several researchers have argued that the deficits in the social lives, communication ability, and imagination of autistic children are a result of their deficiencies in role taking. It is believed that autistic children's inability to role take prevents them from developing a theory of mind. Indeed, role taking has been described as the theory of mind in action. Failing to role take and failing to develop a theory of mind may lead autistic children to use only their own understanding of a situation to predict others’ behaviour, resulting in deficits in social understanding.

In support, two studies found shortcomings in role-taking ability in autistic children in comparison to controls. Another study found that lower ability in role taking related significantly with the lower social competency in autistic children. In particular, the autistic children in the study could not focus concurrently on different cognitions required for successful role taking and proficient social interaction. More specifically, Dawson and Fernald found that conceptual role-taking related most to the social deficits and severity of autism experienced by autistic children, while affective role taking was related only to the severity of autism.

== Criticism ==
The main criticism of Selman's role-taking theory is that it focuses too much on the effect of cognitive development on role-taking ability and social cognition, thereby overlooking the non-cognitive factors that affect children's abilities in these domains. For instance, social experiences, such as disagreements between close friends, have been found to foster role-taking skills and social cognitive growth. In addition, parental influence amongst sibling conflicts matters, as mothers who act as mediators to help solve sibling disagreements have been found to promote role-taking skills and social cognitive maturation.

== See also ==
- Role theory
