= Theory-theory =

Means of human learning

The theory-theory (or 'theory theory') is a scientific theory relating to the human development of understanding about the outside world. This theory asserts that individuals hold a basic or 'naïve' theory of psychology ("folk psychology") to infer the mental states of others, such as their beliefs, desires or emotions. This information is used to understand the intentions behind that person's actions or predict future behavior. The term 'perspective taking' is sometimes used to describe how one makes inferences about another person's inner state using theoretical knowledge about the other's situation.

This approach has become popular with psychologists as it gives a basis from which to explore human social understanding. Beginning in the mid-1980s, several influential developmental psychologists began advocating the theory theory: the view that humans learn through a process of theory revision closely resembling the way scientists propose and revise theories. Children observe the world, and in doing so, gather data about the world's true structure. As more data accumulates, children can revise their naive theories accordingly. Children can also use these theories about the world's causal structure to make predictions, and possibly even test them out. This concept is described as the 'Child Scientist' theory, proposing that a series of personal scientific revolutions are required for the development of theories about the outside world, including the social world.

In recent years, proponents of Bayesian learning have begun describing the theory theory in a precise, mathematical way. The concept of Bayesian learning is rooted in the assumption that children and adults learn through a process of theory revision; that is, they hold prior beliefs about the world but, when receiving conflicting data, may revise these beliefs depending upon their strength.

== Child development ==
Theory-theory states that children naturally attempt to construct theories to explain their observations. As all humans do, children seek to find explanations that help them understand their surroundings. They learn through their own experiences as well as through their observations of others' actions and behaviors.

Through their growth and development, children will continue to form intuitive theories; revising and altering them as they come across new results and observations. Several developmentalists have conducted research of the progression of their theories, mapping out when children start to form theories about certain subjects, such as the biological and physical world, social behaviors, and others' thoughts and minds ("theory of mind"), although there remain controversies over when these shifts in theory-formation occur.

As part of their investigative process, children often ask questions, frequently posing "Why?" to adults, not seeking a technical and scientific explanation but instead seeking to investigate the relation of the concept in question to themselves, as part of their egocentric view. In a study where Mexican-American mothers were interviewed over a two-week period about the types of questions their preschool children ask, researchers discovered that the children asked their parents more about biology and social behaviors rather than nonliving objects and artifacts. In their questions, the children were mostly ambiguous, unclear if they desired an explanation of purpose or cause. Although parents will usually answer with a causal explanation, some children found the answers and explanations inadequate for their understanding, and as a result, they begin to create their own theories, particularly evident in children's understanding of religion.

This theory also plays a part in Vygotsky's social learning theory, also called modeling. Vygotsky claims that humans, as social beings, learn and develop by observing others' behavior and imitating them. In this process of social learning, prior to imitation, children will first post inquiries and investigate why adults act and behave in a particular way. Afterwards, if the adult succeeds at the task, the child will likely copy the adult, but if the adult fails, the child will choose not to follow the example.

== Comparison with other theories ==
=== Theory of mind (ToM) ===
Theory-theory is closely related to theory of mind (ToM), which concerns mental states of people, but differs from ToM in that the full scope of theory-theory also concerns mechanical devices or other objects, beyond just thinking about people and their viewpoints.

=== Simulation theory ===
In the scientific debate in mind reading, theory-theory is often contrasted with simulation theory, an alternative theory which suggests simulation or cognitive empathy is integral to our understanding of others.
