= Robert L. Selman =

American educational psychologist

- Born: May 7, 1942 (age 84)
- Education: Cornell University, Boston University
- Occupation: Professor

Robert L. Selman (born May 7, 1942) is an American-born educational psychologist and perspective-taking theorist who specializes in adolescent social development. He is a professor of Education and Human Development at the Harvard Graduate School of Education, and a professor of psychology in Medicine at Harvard University. He is the author of the 1980s G.I. Joe public service announcements.

== Education and career ==
Selman received a B.A. in psychology from Cornell University and a Ph.D. from Boston University in Clinical, Community, and Counseling Psychology in 1969. He then studied with Lawrence Kohlberg at Harvard University both under a National Institute of Mental Health (NIMH) post-doctoral fellowship in developmental psychology, and as a research associate.

Selman's initial research focused on the child's developing capacity to coordinate points of view, develop interpersonal negotiation strategies, and become aware of the personal meaning of risk in the context of social relationships and the larger culture. From 1975 to 1990, Selman was the director of the Manville School of the Judge Baker Children's Center, which provides special educational and clinical services for children with severe social, emotional, and behavioral difficulties. During his tenure as director, the Manville School provided academic training opportunities in both research and practice to doctoral students from the Harvard Graduate School of Education.

In 1992 Selman founded the Prevention Science and Practice Program for masters students at the Harvard Graduate School of Education. He was the director of this program for seven years (1992-1999). Selman's courses at Harvard draw from his ongoing research into the developmental and cultural antecedents of children's capacity to form and maintain social relationships, and to take positive rather than negative risks.

Selman has examined the relationship between the promotion of children's social awareness and of their literacy skills through child and young adult literature, both in the elementary grades, as described in his 2003 book, The Promotion of Social Awareness (awarded best book by moral education division of the American Educational Research Association), and in history, social studies, and literature courses in middle and high school. Scholars have drawn from Selman's inquiry into the promotion of youth civic engagement and the understanding of bullying (and bystanding) behaviors in adolescence to inform their own understandings of youth development.

Selman served as the chair of the Human Development and Psychology department at HGSE from 2000 to 2004, and currently serves as senior associate at the Judge Baker Children's Center and at the Department of Psychiatry at Children's Hospital Boston.

Selman is the recipient of two Fulbright Fellowships to Iceland, and was a Scholar in Residence at the Russell Sage Foundation in 1999–2000. He is a Fellow of the American Psychological Association, the Association for Psychological Science, and the American Educational Research Association. In 2009, he was the first scholar-in-residence at Bank Street College. He received a lifetime achievement Kuhmerker Career Award from the Association for Moral Education in 2010.

From 2010 to 2015, he served as a Principal Investigator on a five-year project entitled Catalyzing Comprehension through Discussion and Debate, supported by the Institute of Education Sciences (IES). He currently consults with the television production division of the Walt Disney Company and the education department of Walden Media, LLC on the development of children's and adolescent's media and curricula.

== Work ==
Selman's research has focused on helping children develop social-awareness and social-engagement competencies as a way to reduce risks to their health, as well as to promote their social relationships and academic performance. His work on the promotion of children's understanding of ways to get along with others from different backgrounds is conducted in the context of literacy and language arts curricula at the elementary level; in school-based programs designed to coordinate support and prevention services for students in public middle schools; and in the social studies, literature, and history curricula for high schools. His past work focused on the treatment of psychological disorders of youth in day school and residential treatment and the prevention of these disorders in children and adolescents placed at risk

=== Perspective taking theory ===
Selman's theory of perspective-taking suggests that the ability to differentiate and coordinate the social perspectives of self and others, cognitively and emotionally, forms the basis of social communication as well as action. His developmental approach theorizes that perspective taking becomes both more sophisticated and more differentiated with age and maturity. Selman's theory postulates that a child's capacity to coordinate multiple points of view towards shared social experiences may promote the development of interpersonal understanding and relational management skills. Over time, as children learn to see other people's points of view and integrate them with their own, they are more apt to display deeper understandings about other people—such as their thoughts, feelings, and motivations—and as a result are better able to manage relationships in their lives. Jürgen Habermas has drawn upon Selman's Perspective-Taking Theory as a model for describing the varying degrees of communicative action that may be achieved. That is, Habermas adapted Selman's evidence-based investigations of perspective-taking to argue that the ability to take on the perspectives of other discussion partners had developmental stages. Thus far, this theory has been used to understand the development of peer relationships, risk-taking behavior such as fighting and drinking, and student engagement in intervention programs

=== Risk and resiliency framework ===
From the 1980s onward Selman directed his attention towards applying foundational research in child psychology to practical applications in order to promote the positive social development of children and youth. Selman investigated child risk factors that could potentially result in negative life experiences. He examined interventions and prevention models that could be used to ameliorate the effects of childhood risk factors and promote positive contexts and experiences to optimize children's health, academic capabilities, and social welfare. This "Risk and Resiliency Framework" informed the development of the Risk and Prevention program at the Harvard Graduate School of Education and also reflected his later involvement with school-based or media-based practical interventions. During his early career time, Selman became actively involved with several local schools in the Boston and Cambridge area, including the now-closed Lucy Stone School in Dorchester, Massachusetts. His involvement in these schools, and his realization that schools can play a significant role in promoting social interventions but face enormous challenges in tending to both the academic and social needs of their students, fueled the writing of the 2003 book, The Promotion of Social Awareness as well as a chapter titled "Risk and Prevention" in the 6th edition of the Handbook of Child Psychology (2006).

=== Curriculum Design & Contributions ===
Up until the 1990s, Selman's risk and prevention framework had been used primarily to understand one-on-one social interactions between individuals. By moving these ideas into a school-based curriculum, Selman and his colleagues experimented with how the approach applied to children's understanding of their relationships with peers from different cultures or identity groups. One method of delivery was to children's literature that contained stories with social justice themes, and then to design teachers' guides for these texts. Selman partnered with colleagues, such as literacy expert and linguist Catherine E. Snow, to develop methods of literacy instruction that could be used in grades K-6. Selman and Snow collaborated with colleagues at Zaner-Bloser to develop Teachers' Guides for books such as Freedom Summer and Felita. The guides were designed to teach reading and writing but also included exercises to develop students' ability to take perspectives on other individuals' experiences, their understanding of others' cultural beliefs, and to strengthen their conflict-resolution strategies. Selman and colleagues conducted qualitative and quantitative studies of classrooms as they used the texts. In these studies, and subsequent work, Selman and his colleagues questioned the ways in which social perspective-taking and understanding may be related to student's reading, writing, and oral communication skills. For Selman, this work signaled a transition in his career from conducting primarily foundational research in child development to developing school-based practices to negotiating school policy and then cycling back to research, this time focused on working with and learning from schools and communities. He has also consulted with and contributed to the content for Facing History and Ourselves curricular materials designed to promote civic and moral engagement in youth, and he is a guest expert for the Random Acts of Kindness Foundation's (RAK) online curriculum for educators who want to promote social-emotional learning in their classrooms (RAK is funded by Philip Anschutz's The Foundation for a Better Life). In collaboration with Dr. Catherine E. Snow, Selman is a senior author of "Voices: Literature and Writing Curriculum" (PreK to grade 6) published in 2012 by Zaner-Bloser.

=== Children's television and teen digital media ===
Selman collaborating with his wife Anne who holds an MA in early childhood development served as educational consultants on the popular 1980s cartoon G.I. Joe: A Real American Hero; Selman was responsible for the educational content of the And Knowing is Half the Battle PSA's. Selman's research has also explored contemporary issues related to the multiple roles of new media in adolescents' social lives and experiences, drawing on data from MTV's "A Thin Line" campaign. The project included collaboration with colleagues at MIT's Media Lab, including Henry Lieberman. Selman has also worked with Walden Media to produce multiple cross-media curricula designed to bridge the narratives of classic children's books and their motion picture adaptations, including The Watsons Go to Birmingham (by Christopher Paul Curtis) and The Giver (by Lois Lowry).

=== Civic and moral initiatives ===
With Professor Helen Haste of Harvard University and the University of Bath, Selman is the Co-principal Investigator of a comparative study on New Civics Early Career Scholars funded by the Spencer Foundation. With Harvard professors Helen Haste and Meira Levinson, Selman has also conducted work in civic education, civic development and civic engagement at HGSE, including the Spender Foundation funded Early Career Scholars Program in New Civics.

=== The China Lab ===
Selman has collaborated extensively with former doctoral student Xu Zhao, now a Research Excellence Chair at the University of Calgary, on studies exploring the intersection of moral, civic, and social development among Chinese youth. Their first project, funded by the Harvard China Fund and conducted with Helen Haste, explores how Chinese adolescents navigate social dilemmas and perceive civic responsibilities amid intense academic pressures and cultural shifts in China. Their research focuses on youth's perceptions of bystander roles in teasing, their attributions of causes and solutions to major social issues in China (ranging from compliant to cynical to critical perspectives), and culturally sensitive interventions to reduce academic stress among youth in China and beyond.

With the sociologist Allan Luke, Selman and Zhao examine Chinese parenting habitus in the context of academic competition and sociocultural changes in their 2018 book chapter. Their analysis is highlighted by a book reviewer as offering "arguably the best example of 'reflective re-appropriation' of Bourdieu's sociological theory". In 2020, Selman and Zhao co-authored a book with Catherine E. Snow on bilingual literacy programs in early childhood education. Published in China in both English and Chinese, their book explores cultural tensions in bilingual education and offers concrete examples of using children's literature to foster empathy and psychological wellness. They also organized the 2018 University of Calgary Symposium on Youth Mental Health and Intervention, bringing together educational and mental health researchers from Canada, the United States and China to address mental health challenges in educational settings.

Their interdisciplinary work in China contributes critical sociocultural perspectives to the field of youth psychosocial development. It also provides culturally sensitive strategies for mitigating psychological risks and promoting social and civic engagement in East Asia's rapidly evolving educational landscapes. Their article on academic stress and prevention strategy gained an altmetric score of 33 within two weeks of publication, the highest out of all the Cogent series titles at the time, and top five among articles published by all Taylor & Francis journals. Their work is also featured by Education Week, the Harvard Crimson, the Washing Post and others. A key methodological contribution is the Dual Dynamic Analysis (DDA) framework they developed, using focus group data from two age groups (8 & 11), three types schools and urban and rural settings. It offers an integrated approach for understanding the interplay between cultural narratives, local socioeconomic contexts, and individual reasoning in shaping young people's social and moral judgment.

== Publications ==
Selman published The Growth of Interpersonal Understanding: Developmental and Clinical Analyses in 1980. This text introduced Selman's general framework and empirical background for theories for his social perspective taking theory, and served as the precursor for his future works. In 1997, Selman co-edited Fostering Friendship: Pair Therapy for Treatment and Prevention with Lynn Hickey Shultz a professor of psychology at Harvard University and Caroline Watts a lecturer and researcher at Harvard University. Fostering Friendship introduces "pair-therapy" as a therapeutic intervention method designed to help children develop healthy interpersonal relationships. The method is suggested by physicians for clinical settings. This approach, which involves developing a nurturing relationship between an adult and two children, is also used outside of clinical settings as a prevention method used by counselors and teachers in public schools, daycare centers, and other youth development settings.

In The Promotion of Social Awareness: Powerful Lessons from the Partnership of Developmental Theory and Classroom Practice, published in 2003, Selman shifted his theoretical frame from one-on-one interventions to considering cultural themes. This text demonstrates the evolution of Selman's work as it that draws from his earlier clinical work and connects it to school-based practice. The book is based on his studies of the way young people growing up under difficult life circumstances (such as dysfunctional families, neighborhood poverty, and social prejudice) learn how to relate to others. Selman describes "social competence" as the ability to coordinate one's own perspective with that of others, through mutual understanding and negotiation. In The Promotion of Social Awareness, Selman combines his work on developmental psychology, ethnography, and extensive practical experience of implementing initiatives in schools to promote children's ability to form good social relations with others. In 2005, Selman's The Promotion of Social Awareness was awarded the Outstanding Book Award by the American Educational Research Association Section on Moral Development and Education.

== Personal life ==
Selman is married to Anne Selman, and father to two children, Jesse Selman and Matt Selman.
