= Helen Haste =

British psychologist

Helen Elizabeth Haste (born 17 March 1943), also known as Helen Weinreich-Haste, is a British social, developmental, and cultural psychologist and a writer and broadcaster. She is a visiting professor in the Harvard Graduate School of Education. She is an emeritus professor of psychology at the University of Bath. Haste also holds honorary visiting positions at the University of Exeter, the Hong Kong Institute of Education, and the University of Jinan China.

== Early life and education ==
Haste was born in Devizes, Wiltshire. She graduated with a Bachelor of Arts (BA) from a London university in 1967, a Master of Philosophy (MPhil) from the University of Sussex in 1971, and a PhD from the University of Bath in 1985.

== Academic honours and service ==
Haste is a Fellow of the British Psychological Society, a Fellow of the Academy of Social Science and a Fellow of the Royal Society of Arts. She is also an Honorary Fellow of the British Science Association. She was president of the International Society of Political Psychology in 2002. Haste received the Nevitt Sanford award (2005) and the Jeanne Knutson award (2009) from that organisation for her contributions to the field of political psychology. She received the Kuhmerker Award from the Association for Moral Education in 2011 for her lifelong contributions to moral education. For many years she was associated with the British Association for the Advancement of Science (now the British Science Association), serving as vice-president (2002–2008), chair of council (2002–2004), and president of the Psychology Section in 1991.

From 2007 to 2013, Haste served as the chair of the editorial board of the Journal of Moral Education. From 2010 to 2015 she was co-editor of the journal Political Psychology.
