= Perspective-taking =

Act of analyzing from an alternative point of view

Perspective-taking is the act of perceiving a situation or understanding a concept from an alternative point of view, such as that of another individual.

A vast amount of scientific literature suggests that perspective-taking is crucial to human development and that it may lead to a variety of beneficial outcomes. Perspective-taking may also be possible in some non-human animals.

Both theory and research have suggested ages when children begin to perspective-take and how that ability develops over time. Past research has suggested that certain people who have attention deficit hyperactivity disorder with comorbid conduct problems (such as Oppositional Defiant Disorder) or autism may have reduced ability to engage in perspective-taking, though newer theories such as the double empathy problem posit that such difficulties may be mutual between people.

Studies to assess the brain regions involved in perspective-taking suggest that several regions may be involved, including the prefrontal cortex and the precuneus.

Perspective-taking is related to other theories and concepts including theory of mind and empathy.

== Definition ==
Perspective-taking takes place when an individual views a situation from another's point of view. Perspective-taking has been defined along two dimensions: perceptual and conceptual.

Perceptual perspective-taking is the ability to understand how another person experiences things through their senses (e.g., visually or auditorily). Most of the literature devoted to perceptual perspective-taking focuses on visual perspective-taking: the ability to understand the way another person sees things in physical space.

Conceptual perspective-taking is the ability to comprehend and take on the viewpoint of another person's psychological experience (i.e. thoughts, feelings, and attitudes).

=== Related terms ===
==== Theory of mind ====
Theory of mind is the awareness that people have individual psychological states that differ from one another. Within perspective-taking literature, the terms perspective-taking and theory of mind are sometimes used interchangeably; some studies use theory of mind tasks in order to test if someone is engaging in perspective-taking. The two concepts are related but different: theory of mind is the recognition that another person has different thoughts and feelings, while perspective-taking is the ability to take on that other person's point of view.

==== Empathy ====
Empathy has been defined as the ability to share the same emotions another person is having. Empathy and perspective-taking have been studied together in a variety of ways. There are not always clear lines of distinction between empathy and perspective-taking; the two concepts are often studied in conjunction with one another and viewed as related and similar. Some research distinguishes the two concepts and points out their differences, while other literature theorizes that perspective-taking is one component of empathy.

== In development ==
=== Visual ===
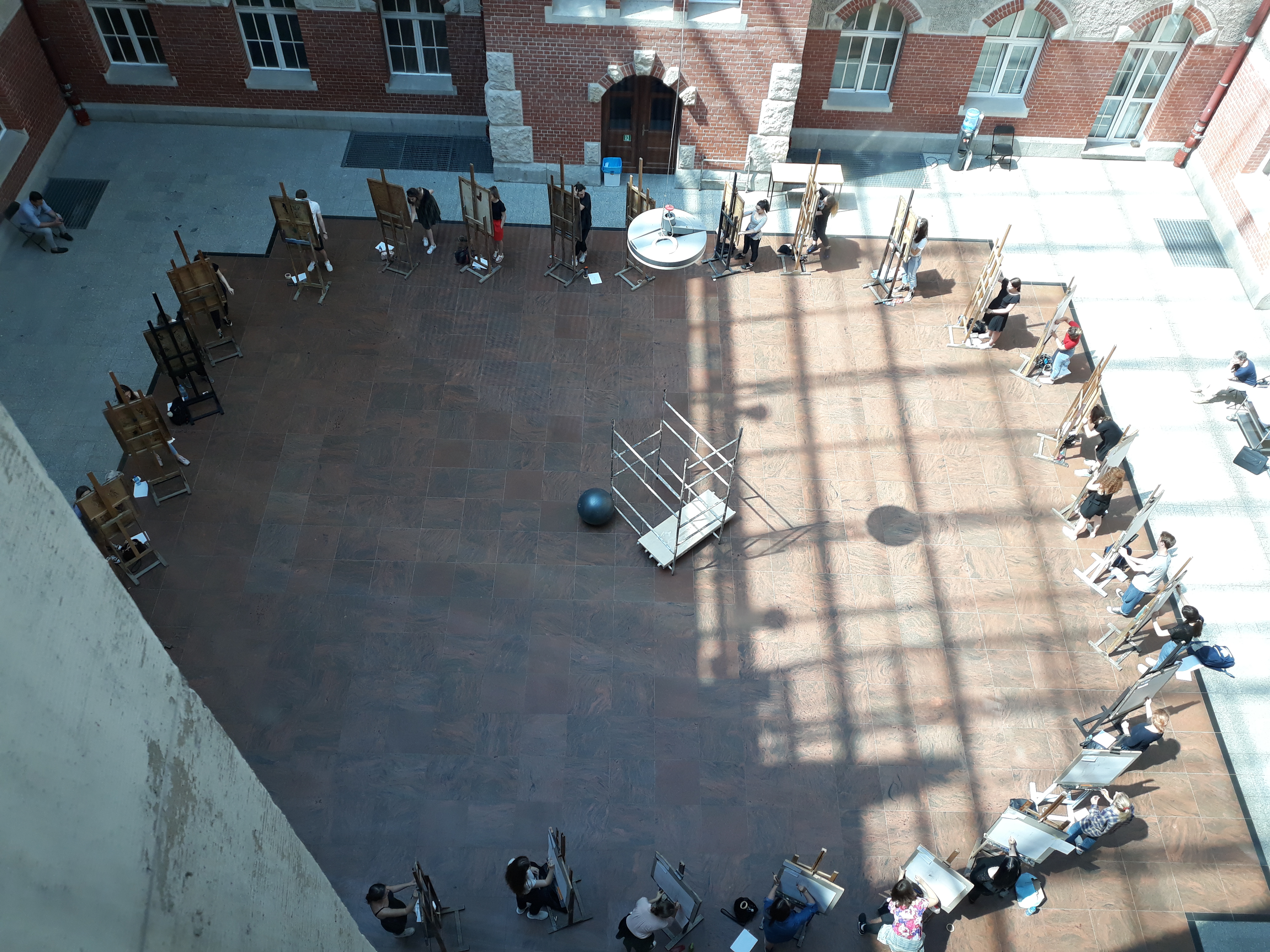
Architecture students draw a ball and scaffolding. Everyone sees its shapes from a different perspective

Studies have assessed the age at which humans are capable of visual perspective-taking, and have drawn different conclusions.

In 1956, Jean Piaget and Bärbel Inhelder conducted a study to assess the visual perspective-taking abilities of young children. This study has come to be known as the three mountain problem. It found that by the ages of nine to ten, children can successfully complete the three mountain problem and they seem able to understand that when someone is standing in a different location (i.e. on a different mountain top) they have a different view. However, children ages eight and under struggled with this task.

Since this classic study, a number of studies have suggested that visual perspective-taking may be possible earlier than the age of nine. For example, a study that used a different method to assess visual perspective-taking suggested that children may be able to successfully visually perspective-take by the age of four and a half years old. In this study, four-and-a-half-year-old children were able to understand that someone sitting closer to a picture would have a better view of that picture. However, these researchers found that children who were three and three-and-a-half years old struggled with this task which led them to conclude that the age range of three to four-and-a-half years old could be crucial in perspective-taking development.

Developmental psychologist John H. Flavell suggested that there are two levels of visual perspective-taking that emerge as children develop:

1. Level 1 perspective-taking is defined as the ability to understand that someone else may see things differently and to understand what another person can see in physical space. For example, one could understand that while an object may be obstructing their own view, from where another person is standing they can see a cat in the room.
2. Level 2 perspective-taking is defined as the understanding that another person can see things differently in physical space and to understand how those objects are organized from that other person's point of view. For example, a person can understand that from another person's point of view they can see a dog to the right but from their own point of view the dog is to the left.

Studies have examined when children are able to demonstrate level 1 and level 2 perspective-taking. These studies have shown that children at 24 months old and 14 months old may be able to engage in level 1 perspective-taking, and be able to understand various lines of sight depending on the position of a person. Research also suggests that children can engage in level 2 perspective-taking as early as two and a half years old.

Studies also suggest that visual perspective-taking ability improves from childhood to adulthood. For example, in comparing six-year-olds, eight-year-olds, ten-year-olds, and adults (averaging 19 years old) researchers found that as people's age increases, visual perspective-taking tasks can be done with more accuracy and speed.

=== Conceptual ===
In Piaget's theory of cognitive development, he suggests that perspective-taking begins in the concrete operational stage (third stage) which ranges from ages seven to twelve. In this stage the idea of decentration is introduced as a cognitive ability (decentration is the ability to take into account the way others perceive various aspects of a given situation).

Another developmental perspective-taking theory was created by Robert L. Selman and called social perspective-taking theory (or Role-taking theory). This theory suggests that there are five developmental stages involved in perspective-taking ranging from ages three to six (characterized by egocentrism or an inability to think of things from another's point of view) to teenagers and adults (who can understand another person's point of view and whose understanding is informed by recognizing another person's environment and culture). The theory suggests that as humans mature from childhood to adulthood their ability to perspective-take improves. Studies by Selman and colleagues suggest that children can perspective-take in different ways at different ages.

Other studies assess that children can begin to take on the viewpoint of another person, considering their feelings, thoughts, and attitudes, as four-year-olds.

== In adults ==
Although the distinction between visual and cognitive perspective-taking is important, some authors claim that all forms of perspective-taking rely on the same general ability, and different types of perspective-taking correlate.

With respect to visual perspective-taking in adults, Tversky and Hard (2009) have shown that observers tend to use the point of view of another person when describing the spatial relations of objects. Processing other perspectives may be spontaneous, and according to some studies even automatic.

There are also cases where we spontaneously evaluate what another person is seeing, but we make systematic mistakes. A striking example is when a person in a scene is looking towards a mirror, we often interpret that as if they are seeing themselves even when the layout makes it impossible. This phenomenon is known as the Venus effect

== Brain regions ==
=== Visual ===
Visual perspective-taking studies that focus on brain regions are generally performed by collecting functional magnetic resonance imaging (fMRI) data while participants perform perspective-taking tasks. For example, a participant may be shown a picture of another person with objects around them and asked to take on the viewpoint of that person and indicate the number of objects they see (Level 1 visual perspective-taking) and if the objects are located to the right or left of the other person (level 2 visual perspective-taking). While the participant is completing this task they are also having an fMRI scan.

A meta-analysis that looked at fMRI research on visual perspective-taking as of 2013 suggested that several areas of the brain have clustered activation during these perspective-taking tasks. These areas included the left prefrontal cortex, the precuneus, and the left cerebellum. Studies suggest these areas of the brain are involved in decision-making visual imagery, and attention respectively.

=== Conceptual ===
Research also suggests that multiple brain areas are involved in conceptual perspective-taking. Studies have been conducted by administering a positron emission tomography (PET) scan and asking participants to engage in perspective-taking tasks. For example, in one study, participants who were all medical students were asked to consider the knowledge base someone who was not in the medical field would have on a list of medical questions.

Studies suggest that regions that are activated during cognitive perspective-taking include the right parietal lobe and the posterior cingulate cortex among others. Some areas seem to be involved both when people imagine themselves and when they imagine the perspective of others. For example, when participants were asked to imagine themselves engaging in an activity versus imagining another person engaging in that activity the precuneus and the supplementary motor area (SMA) were activated, suggesting visual imagery and motor movement thoughts were involved in both tasks.

== Deficits ==
=== Attention deficit hyperactivity disorder (ADHD) ===
Research highlights that perspective-taking may be more difficult for some children who have attention deficit hyperactivity disorder (ADHD) plus co-occurring conduct disorders. ADHD research has shown that children with this diagnosis demonstrate impairments in attention and communication: They have a harder time taking on the viewpoint of others than children who do not.

=== Autism ===
Studies from the 1980s and 1990s have suggested that children with autism may be able to engage in visual perspective-taking but have difficulty engaging in conceptual perspective-taking. For example, a study that compared perspective-taking scores in children who had been diagnosed with autism as compared to children who did not have this diagnosis found no significant difference in scores on level 1 and level 2 visual perspective-taking. However, the study found it was much harder for autistic children to engage in conceptual perspective-taking tasks.

In 2012, the double empathy problem was proposed by researcher Damian Milton. The theory posits that social difficulties, including failures in perspective-taking traditionally ascribed to inherent deficits in autistic people, may instead be mutual and occur in communication between autistic and non-autistic people.

Some studies have explored potential interventions that could help improve perspective-taking abilities in children with autism. They suggest that video may help teach perspective-taking skills in such children. One intervention study with autistic children found that showing the children a video of someone engaging in perspective-taking tasks and explaining their actions led to improved perspective-taking ability.

== Outcomes ==
An abundance of literature links perspective-taking abilities with other behaviors. Much of this literature focuses on conceptual perspective-taking.

=== Benefit ===
Conceptual perspective-taking gives one the ability to better understand the reason behind another person's actions. This also helps one engage in social conversations in an acceptable and friendly way.

=== Empathy ===
Many studies associate perspective-taking with empathy. Psychologist Mark Davis suggested that empathy consists of multiple dimensions. To assess this, Davis developed the Interpersonal Reactivity Index (IRI). The IRI consists of four subscales: fantasy, empathic concern, personal distress, and perspective-taking. The perspective-taking subscale asks participants to report how likely they are to engage in trying to see things from another person's point of view. Studies using this widely cited measure found that perspective-taking is associated with many prosocial behaviors. One study, which assessed cross-cultural data in 63 countries using the IRI, concluded that perspective-taking and empathic concern was associated with volunteerism and agreeableness as well as self-esteem and life satisfaction.

Research suggests that perspective-taking leads to empathic concern. This research distinguishes between two different types of perspective-taking: thinking of how oneself would act, feel, and behave if placed in someone else's situation and thinking of the way that another person thinks, feels, and behaves in their own situation. The results of this research reveals that thinking of how another person behaves and feels in their own situation leads to feelings of empathy. However, thinking of how one would behave in another person's situation leads to feelings of empathy as well as of distress.

Research also finds that in negotiations, taking on the perspective of another person and empathizing with them may have differential outcomes. One study found that people who engaged in perspective-taking were more effective in making a deal with another person and in finding innovative agreements that satisfied both parties, as compared to those who empathized with someone else.

=== Sympathy and caring ===
Research reveals that perspective-taking is associated with sympathy toward others and prosocial behavior in children as young as 18 months old. A study of sibling interactions found that toddlers who were older siblings were more likely to help take care of their younger siblings when they demonstrated higher perspective-taking abilities.

=== Creativity ===
Perspective-taking is also associated with creativity. It increases the amount of creative ideas generated in team activities. One study suggests that perspective-taking leads to more creative and innovative ideas particularly in participants who are internally driven to complete a task.

=== Bias and stereotype reduction ===
Many studies find potential benefits of perspective-taking on the perceptions of outgroup members. Studies on perspective-taking and bias and stereotyping are generally done by asking participants to take the perspective of another person who is different from them in certain domains (i.e. asking young adult participants to take on the perspective of an elderly person or asking White participants to take on the perspective of a Black person seen in a photograph or video). Such studies show that perspective-taking can lead to reduced stereotyping of outgroup members, improved attitudes towards others, and increased helping behavior of outgroup members. Perspective-taking can lead to reduced in-group favoritism. Research on implicit (or unconscious) biases found that perspective-taking can reduce implicit bias scores (as measured by the Implicit-association test) as well as more recognition of subtle discrimination.

=== In disagreements ===
Research into differences between having a conversation with someone whom you agree with versus with someone with whom you disagree finds that participants who disagreed had enhanced perspective-taking ability and could better remember the conversation.

=== Drawbacks ===
Some researchers suggest drawbacks to perspective-taking. For example, studies found that asking people to engage in perspective-taking tasks can lead to increased stereotyping of the target if the target is deemed as having more stereotypic qualities and as adopting stereotypic behaviors of outgroup members.

== Other animals ==
Studies to assess if nonhuman animals can successfully engage in perspective-taking have not drawn consistent conclusions. Many such studies assess perspective-taking by training animals on specific tasks or by measuring how consistently animals follow the eye gaze of humans. Being able to successfully follow another's eye gaze could indicate that the animal is aware that the human is seeing and paying attention to something that is different from what they see.

A study of spider monkeys and capuchin monkeys found that these primates successfully performed eye-gazing tasks. This led researchers to conclude that the monkeys demonstrated some ability to consider another person's viewpoint. However, another study found that Rhesus monkeys were unsuccessful at such eye-gazing tasks.

Studies suggest that dogs have complex social understanding. In one study, researchers told a dog it was not allowed to eat a treat and then placed the treat in a location that the dog could reach. Dogs were more likely to eat the treat after being instructed not to if there was a barrier that hid the dog from the instructor. Dogs were less likely to eat the treat if the barrier was of smaller size or had a window. This study also showed that dogs struggled in other tasks that focused on the dog's own visual attention. These researchers suggest that this study provides evidence that dogs may be aware of other's visual perspectives.

== See also ==
- Role reversal
- Role-taking theory
