= Simulation theory of empathy =

Psychological theory

The simulation theory of empathy holds that humans anticipate and make sense of the behavior of others by activating mental processes that, if they culminated in action, would produce similar behavior. This includes intentional behavior as well as the expression of emotions. The theory says that children use their own emotions to predict what others will do; We project our own mental states onto others.

Simulation theory is not primarily a theory about empathy, but rather a theory of how people understand others—that they do so by way of a kind of empathetic response.

== Origin ==
Simulation theory is based in philosophy of mind, a branch of philosophy that studies the nature of the mind and its relationship to the brain, especially the work of Alvin Goldman and Robert Gordon. The discovery of mirror neurons in macaque monkeys provides a physiological mechanism to explain the common coding between perception and action (see Wolfgang Prinz) and the hypothesis of a similar mirror neuron system in the human brain. Since the discovery of the mirror neuron system, many studies have been carried out to examine the role of this system in action understanding, emotion, and other social functions.

== Development ==
Mirror neurons are activated both when actions are executed and when actions are observed. This function of mirror neurons may explain how people recognize and understand the states of others: they mirror the observed action in the brain as if they conducted the observed action.

Two sets of evidence suggest that mirror neurons in the monkey have a role in action understanding. First, the activation of mirror neurons requires biological effectors such as the hand or mouth. Mirror neurons do not respond to actions undertaken by tools like pliers. Mirror neurons respond to neither the sight of an object alone nor to an action without an object (intransitive action). Umilta and colleagues demonstrated that a subset of mirror neurons fired in the observer when a final critical part of the action was not visible to that observer. The experimenter showed his hand moving toward a cube and grasping it, and later showed the same action without showing the final grasping of the cube (the cube was behind an occluder). Mirror neurons fired in both scenarios. However mirror neurons did not fire when the observer knew that there was not a cube behind the occluder.

Second, responses of mirror neurons to the same action are different depending on context of the action. A single cell recording experiment with monkeys demonstrated the different level of activation of mouth mirror neurons when monkey observed mouth movement depending on context (ingestive actions such as sucking juice vs. communicative actions such as lip-smacking or tongue protrusions). An fMRI study also showed that mirror neurons respond to the action of grasping a cup differently depending on context (to drink a cup of coffee vs. to clean a table on which a cup was placed).

Since mirror neurons fire both for someone watching an action and someone completing an action, they may only predict actions, not beliefs or desires.

=== Emotion understanding ===
Shared neural representation for a motor behavior and its observation has been extended into the domains of feelings and emotions. Not only observations of movements but also those of facial expressions activate the same brain regions that are activated by direct experiences. In an fMRI study, the same brain regions activated when people imitated and observed emotional facial expressions such as happy, sad, angry, surprise, disgust, and afraid.

Observing video clips that displayed facial expressions indicating disgust activated the neural networks typical of direct experience of disgust. Similar results have been found in the case of touch. Watching movies in which someone touched legs or faces activated the somatosensory cortex for direct feeling of the touch. A similar mirror system exists in perceiving pain. When people see other people feel pain, people feel pain not only affectively, but also sensorially.

These results suggest that understanding another's feelings and emotions is driven not by cognitive deduction of what the stimuli means but by automatic activation of somatosensory neurons. A recent study on pupil size directly demonstrated emotion perception as an automatic process modulated by mirror systems. When people saw sad faces, pupil sizes influenced viewers in perceiving and judging emotional states without explicit awareness of differences of pupil size. When pupil size was 180% of original size, people perceived a sad face as less negative and less intense than when pupil was smaller than or equal to original pupil size. This mechanism was correlated with brain regions implicated in emotion processing, such as the amygdala. Viewers mirror the size of their own pupils to those of sad faces they watch. Considering that pupil size is beyond voluntary control, the change of pupil size upon emotion judgment is a good indication that understanding emotions is automatic process. However, the study could not find that other emotional faces, such as faces displaying happiness and anger, influence pupil size as sadness did.

=== Epistemological role of empathy ===
Based on findings from neuroimaging studies, de Vignemont and Singer proposed empathy as a crucial factor in human communication: "Empathy might enable us to make faster and more accurate predictions of other people's needs and actions and discover salient aspects of our environment." Mental mirroring of actions and emotions may enable humans to understand other's actions and their related environment quickly, and thus help humans communicate efficiently.

In an fMRI study, a mirror system has been proposed as common neural substrate that mediates the experience of basic emotions. Participants watched video clips of happy, sad, angry, and disgusted facial expressions, and researchers measured their empathy quotient (EQ). Specific brain regions relevant to the four emotions were found to be correlated with the EQ while the mirror system (i.e., the left dorsal inferior frontal gyrus/premotor cortex) was correlated to the EQ across all emotions. The authors interpreted this result as an evidence that action perception mediates face perception to emotion perception.

== Empathy for pain ==
A paper published in Science challenges the idea that pain sensations and mirror neurons play a role in empathy for pain. Specifically, the authors found that activity in the anterior insula and the anterior cingulate cortex (two regions known to be responsible for the affective experience of pain) was present both when one's self and when another person were presented with a painful stimulus, but the rest of the pain matrix responsible for sensation was not active. Furthermore, participants merely saw the hand of another person with the electrode on it, making it unlikely that "mirroring" could have caused the empathic response. However, a number of other studies, using magnetoencephalography and functional MRI have since demonstrated that empathy for pain does involve the somatosensory cortex, which supports the simulation theory.

Support for the anterior insula and anterior cingulate cortex being the neural substrates of empathy includes Wicker et al., 2003 who report that their "core finding is that the anterior insula is activated both during observation of disgusted facial expressions and during the emotion of disgust evoked by unpleasant odorants."

Furthermore, one study demonstrated that "for actions, emotions, and sensations both animate and inanimate touch activates our inner representation of touch." They note, however that "it is important at this point to clarify the fact that we do not believe that the activation we observe evolved in order to empathize with other objects or human beings"

== Empathy activating altruism ==
This model states that empathy activates only one interpersonal motivation: altruism. Theoretically, this model makes sense, because empathy is an other-focused emotion. There is an impressive history of research suggesting that empathy, when activated, causes people to act in ways to benefit the other, such as receiving electric shocks for the other. These findings have often been interpreted in terms of empathy causing increased altruistic motivation, which in turn causes helping behavior.

== See also ==
- Mentalization
- Moral emotions
- Perspective-taking
- Social emotions
- Theory of mind
