= Theory of mind =

Ability to attribute mental states to oneself and others

In psychology and philosophy, theory of mind (often abbreviated to ToM) is the capacity to understand other individuals by ascribing mental states to them. A theory of mind includes the understanding that others' beliefs, desires, intentions, emotions, and thoughts may be different from one's own. Possessing a functional theory of mind is crucial for success in everyday human social interactions. People use a theory of mind when analyzing, judging, and inferring other people's behaviors.

Theory of mind was first conceptualized by researchers evaluating the presence of theory of mind in animals. Today, theory of mind research also investigates factors affecting theory of mind in humans, such as whether drug and alcohol consumption, language development, cognitive delays, age, and culture can affect a person's capacity to display theory of mind.

It has been proposed that deficits in theory of mind may occur in people with autism, anorexia nervosa, schizophrenia, dysphoria, addiction, and brain damage caused by alcohol's neurotoxicity. Neuroimaging shows that the medial prefrontal cortex (mPFC), the posterior superior temporal sulcus (pSTS), the precuneus, and the amygdala are associated with theory of mind tasks. Patients with frontal lobe or temporoparietal junction lesions find some theory of mind tasks difficult. One's theory of mind develops in childhood as the prefrontal cortex develops.

== Definition ==
The "theory of mind" is described as a theory because the behavior of the other person, such as their statements and expressions, is the only thing being directly observed; no one has direct access to the mind of another, and the existence and nature of the mind must be inferred. It is the ability to attribute mental states such as beliefs, intentions, emotions, desires and knowledge to oneself and others. It is typically assumed others have minds analogous to one's own; this assumption is based on three reciprocal social interactions, as observed in joint attention, the functional use of language, and the understanding of others' emotions and actions. Theory of mind allows one to attribute thoughts, desires, and intentions to others, to predict or explain their actions, and to posit their intentions. It enables one to understand that mental states can be the cause of—and can be used to explain and predict—the behavior of others. Being able to attribute mental states to others and understanding them as causes of behavior implies, in part, one must be able to conceive of the mind as a "generator of representations". If a person does not have a mature theory of mind, it may be a sign of cognitive or developmental impairment.

Theory of mind appears to be an innate potential ability in humans that requires social and other experience over many years for its full development. Different people may develop more or less effective theories of mind. Neo-Piagetian theories of cognitive development maintain that theory of mind is a byproduct of a broader hypercognitive ability of the human mind to register, monitor, and represent its own functioning.

Empathy—the recognition and understanding of the states of mind of others, including their beliefs, desires, and particularly emotions—is a related concept. Empathy is often characterized as the ability to "put oneself into another's shoes". Recent neuro-ethological studies of animal behavior suggest that rodents may exhibit empathic abilities. While empathy is known as emotional perspective-taking, theory of mind is defined as cognitive perspective-taking.

Research on theory of mind, in humans and animals, adults and children, normally and atypically developing, has grown rapidly in the years since Premack and Guy Woodruff's 1978 paper, "Does the chimpanzee have a theory of mind?". The field of social neuroscience has also begun to address this debate by imaging the brains of humans while they perform tasks that require the understanding of an intention, belief, or other mental state in others.

An alternative account of theory of mind is given in operant psychology and provides empirical evidence for a functional account of both perspective-taking and empathy. The most developed operant approach is founded on research on derived relational responding and is subsumed within relational frame theory. Derived relational responding relies on the ability to identify derived relations, or relationships between stimuli that are not directly learned or reinforced; for example, if "snake" is related to "danger" and "danger" is related to "fear", people may know to fear snakes even without learning an explicit connection between snakes and fear. According to this view, empathy and perspective-taking comprise a complex set of derived relational abilities based on learning to discriminate and respond verbally to ever more complex relations between self, others, place, and time, and through established relations.

== Philosophical and psychological roots ==
Discussions of theory of mind have their roots in philosophical debate from the time of René Descartes' Second Meditation, which set the foundations for considering the science of the mind.

Two differing approaches in philosophy for explaining theory of mind are theory-theory and simulation theory. Theory-theory claims that individuals use "theories" grounded in folk psychology to reason about others' minds. According to theory-theory, these folk psychology theories are developed automatically and naturally by concepts and rules we have for ourselves, and then incorporated through social interactions. In contrast, simulation theory argues that individuals simulate the internal states of others to build mental models for their cognitive processes. A basic example of this is someone imagining themselves in the position of another person to infer the other person's thoughts and feelings. Theory of mind is also closely related to person perception and attribution theory from social psychology.

It is common and intuitive to assume that others have minds. People attribute human characteristics or behavior to non-human animals, inanimate objects, and even natural phenomena. Daniel Dennett referred to this tendency as taking an "intentional stance" toward things: we assume they have intentions, to help predict their future behavior. However, there is an important distinction between taking an "intentional stance" toward something and entering a "shared world" with it. The intentional stance is a functional relationship, describing the use of a theory due to its practical utility, rather than the accuracy of its representation of the world. As such, it is something people resort to during interpersonal interactions. A shared world is directly perceived and its existence structures reality itself for the perceiver. It is not just a lens, through which the perceiver views the world; it in many ways constitutes the cognition, as both its object and the blueprint used to structure perception into understanding. In recent studies on human interaction with generative artificial intelligence systems, the term noosemia has been proposed to describe the tendency of users to attribute mental states and intentionality to such systems.

The philosophical roots of another perspective, the relational frame theory (RFT) account of theory of mind, arise from contextual psychology, which refers to the study of organisms (both human and non-human) interacting in and with a historical and current situational context. It is an approach based on contextualism, a philosophy in which any event is interpreted as an ongoing act inseparable from its current and historical context and in which a radically functional approach to truth and meaning is adopted. As a variant of contextualism, RFT focuses on the construction of practical, scientific knowledge. This scientific form of contextual psychology is virtually synonymous with the philosophy of operant psychology.

== Development ==
The study of which animals are capable of attributing knowledge and mental states to others, as well as the development of this ability in human ontogeny and phylogeny, identifies several behavioral precursors to theory of mind. Understanding attention, understanding of others' intentions, and imitative experience with others are hallmarks of a theory of mind that may be observed early in the development of what later becomes a full-fledged theory.

Simon Baron-Cohen proposed that infants' understanding of attention in others acts as a critical precursor to the development of theory of mind. Understanding attention involves understanding that seeing can be directed selectively as attention, that the looker assesses the seen object as "of interest", and that seeing can induce beliefs. A possible illustration of theory of mind in infants is joint attention. Joint attention refers to when two people look at and attend to the same thing. Parents often use the act of pointing to prompt infants to engage in joint attention; understanding this prompt requires that infants take into account another person's mental state and understand that the person notices an object or finds it of interest. Baron-Cohen speculates that the inclination to spontaneously reference an object in the world as of interest, via pointing (proto-declarative pointing), and to likewise appreciate the directed attention of another, may be the underlying motive behind all human communication.

Understanding others' intentions is another critical precursor to understanding other minds because intentionality is a fundamental feature of mental states and events. The "intentional stance" was defined by Daniel Dennett as an understanding that others' actions are goal-directed and arise from particular beliefs or desires. Both two- and three-year-old children could discriminate when an experimenter intentionally or accidentally marked a box with stickers. Even earlier in development, Andrew N. Meltzoff found that 18-month-old infants could perform target tasks involving the manipulation of objects that adult experimenters attempted and failed, suggesting the infants could represent the object-manipulating behavior of adults as involving goals and intentions. While attribution of intention and knowledge is investigated in young humans and nonhuman animals to detect precursors to a theory of mind, Gagliardi et al. have pointed out that even adult humans do not always act in a way consistent with an attributional perspective (i.e., based on attribution of knowledge to others). In their experiment, adult human subjects attempted to choose the container baited with a small object from a selection of four containers when guided by confederates who could not see which container was baited.

Research has further demonstrated that infants are not merely passive followers of another person's gaze. By approximately 14 months of age, they begin to selectively follow the gaze of individuals who have previously demonstrated themselves to be reliable sources of information. When an adult's earlier reactions accurately reflected what they saw, infants were more likely to invest effort in following that individual's gaze than that of a previously unreliable adult, while responding normally to the gaze of a new adult who had no established history of unreliability. These findings suggest that even before language is fully developed, infants are already evaluating the trustworthiness of social partners and using this information to guide their attention and learning, providing further evidence of the early foundations of theory of mind.

Research in developmental psychology suggests that an infant's ability to imitate others lies at the origins of both theory of mind and other social-cognitive achievements like perspective-taking and empathy. According to Meltzoff, the infant's innate understanding that others are "like me" allows them to recognize the equivalence between the physical and mental states apparent in others and those felt by the self. For example, the infant uses their own experiences, orienting their head and eyes toward an object of interest to understand the movements of others who turn toward an object; that is, they will generally attend to objects of interest or significance. Some researchers in comparative disciplines have hesitated to put too much weight on imitation as a critical precursor to advanced human social-cognitive skills like mentalizing and empathizing, especially if true imitation is no longer employed by adults. A test of imitation by Alexandra Horowitz found that adult subjects imitated an experimenter demonstrating a novel task far less closely than children did. Horowitz points out that the precise psychological state underlying imitation is unclear and cannot, by itself, be used to draw conclusions about the mental states of humans.

While much research has been done on infants, theory of mind develops continuously throughout childhood and into late adolescence as the synapses in the prefrontal cortex develop. The prefrontal cortex is thought to be involved in planning and decision-making. Children seem to develop theory of mind skills sequentially. The first skill to develop is the ability to recognize that others have diverse desires. Children are able to recognize that others have diverse beliefs soon after. The next skill to develop is recognizing that others have access to different knowledge bases. Finally, children are able to understand that others may have false beliefs and that others are capable of hiding emotions. While this sequence represents the general trend in skill acquisition, it seems that more emphasis is placed on some skills in certain cultures, leading to more valued skills to develop before those that are considered not as important. For example, in individualistic cultures such as the United States, a greater emphasis is placed on the ability to recognize that others have different opinions and beliefs. In a collectivistic culture, such as China, this skill may not be as important and therefore may not develop until later.

=== Language ===
There is evidence that the development of theory of mind is closely intertwined with language development in humans. One meta-analysis showed a moderate to strong correlation (r = 0.43) between performance on theory of mind and language tasks. Both language and theory of mind begin to develop around the same time in children (between ages two and five), but many other abilities develop during this same time period as well, and they do not produce such high correlations with one another nor with theory of mind.

Pragmatic theories of communication assume that infants must possess an understanding of beliefs and mental states of others to infer the communicative content that proficient language users intend to convey. Since spoken phrases can have different meanings depending on context, theory of mind can play a crucial role in understanding the intentions of others and inferring the meaning of words. Empirical results suggest that even 13-month-old infants possess an early capacity for communicative mentalization, enabling them to infer what relevant information is exchanged between communicative partners and to produce gestures that are sufficiently informative for others. These findings imply that human language relies, at least in part, on theory-of-mind skills.

Carol A. Miller posed further possible explanations for this relationship. Perhaps the extent of verbal communication and conversation involving children in a family could explain theory of mind development. Such language exposure could help introduce a child to the different mental states and perspectives of others. Empirical findings indicate that participation in family discussion predicts scores on theory of mind tasks, and that deaf children who have hearing parents and may not be able to communicate with their parents much during early years of development tend to score lower on theory of mind tasks.

Another explanation of the relationship between language and theory of mind development has to do with a child's understanding of mental-state words such as "think" and "believe". Since a mental state is not something that one can observe from behavior, children must learn the meanings of words denoting mental states from verbal explanations alone, requiring knowledge of the syntactic rules, semantic systems, and pragmatics of a language. Studies have shown that understanding of these mental state words predicts theory of mind in four-year-olds.

A third hypothesis is that the ability to distinguish a whole sentence ("Jimmy thinks the world is flat") from its embedded complement ("the world is flat") and understand that one can be true while the other can be false is related to theory of mind development. Recognizing these complements as being independent of one another is a relatively complex syntactic skill and correlates with increased scores on theory of mind tasks in children.

There is also evidence that the areas of the brain responsible for language and theory of mind are closely connected. The temporoparietal junction (TPJ) is involved in the ability to acquire new vocabulary, as well as to perceive and reproduce words. The TPJ also contains areas that specialize in recognizing faces, voices, and biological motion, and in theory of mind. Since all of these areas are located so closely together, it is reasonable to suspect that they work together. Studies have reported an increase in activity in the TPJ when patients are absorbing information through reading or images regarding other peoples' beliefs but not while observing information about physical control stimuli.

=== Theory of mind in adults ===
Adults have theory of mind concepts that they developed as children (concepts such as belief, desire, knowledge, and intention). They use these concepts to meet the diverse demands of social life, ranging from snap decisions about how to trick an opponent in a competitive game, to keeping up with who knows what in a fast-moving conversation, to judging the guilt or innocence of the accused in a court of law.

Boaz Keysar, Dale Barr, and colleagues found that adults often failed to use their theory of mind abilities to interpret a speaker's message, and acted as if unaware that the speaker lacked critical knowledge about a task. In one study, a confederate instructed adult participants to rearrange objects, some of which were not visible to the confederate, as part of a communication game. Only objects that were visible to both the confederate and the participant were part of the game. Despite knowing that the confederate could not see some of the objects, a third of the participants still tried to move those objects. Other studies show that adults are prone to egocentric biases, with which they are influenced by their own beliefs, knowledge, or preferences when judging those of other people, or that they neglect other people's perspectives entirely. There is also evidence that adults with greater memory, inhibitory capacity, and motivation are more likely to use their theory of mind abilities.

In contrast, evidence about indirect effects of thinking about other people's mental states suggests that adults may sometimes use their theory of mind automatically. Agnes Melinda Kovacs and colleagues measured the time it took adults to detect the presence of a ball as it was revealed from behind an occluder. They found that adults' speed of response was influenced by whether another person (the "agent") in the scene thought there was a ball behind the occluder, even though adults were not asked to pay attention to what the agent thought.

Dana Samson and colleagues measured the time it took adults to judge the number of dots on the wall of a room. They found that adults responded more slowly when another person standing in the room happened to see fewer dots than they did, even when they had never been asked to pay attention to what the person could see. It has been questioned whether these "altercentric biases" truly reflect automatic processing of what another person is thinking or seeing or, instead, reflect attention and memory effects cued by the other person, but not involving any representation of what they think or see.

Different theories seek to explain such results. If theory of mind is automatic, this would help explain how people keep up with the theory of mind demands of competitive games and fast-moving conversations. It might also explain evidence that human infants and some non-human species sometimes appear capable of theory of mind, despite their limited resources for memory and cognitive control. If theory of mind is effortful and not automatic, on the other hand, this explains why it feels effortful to decide whether a defendant is guilty or whether a negotiator is bluffing. Economy of effort would help explain why people sometimes neglect to use their theory of mind.

Ian Apperly and Stephen Butterfill suggested that people have "two systems" for theory of mind, in common with "two systems" accounts in many other areas of psychology. In this account, "system 1" is cognitively efficient and enables theory of mind for a limited but useful set of circumstances. "System 2" is cognitively effortful, but enables much more flexible theory of mind abilities. Philosopher Peter Carruthers disagrees, arguing that the same core theory of mind abilities can be used in both simple and complex ways. The account has been criticized by Celia Heyes who suggests that "system 1" theory of mind abilities do not require representation of mental states of other people, and so are better thought of as "sub-mentalizing".

=== In children ===
Children begin to learn about emotions from birth, starting with the ability to detect, recognize, and share caregivers' emotions, and they also imitate their expressions. There is a distinct relationship between children's contemporaneous social behavior during the formative school years and social cognition as measured by theory of mind. Social-cognitive capacities, particularly initiating joint attention (IJA), emerge in infancy and play a significant role in the developmental trajectory of theory of mind in preschool-aged children. Evidence is found that infants who actively engage in initiating joint attention are more likely to develop more advanced mental state understanding later on.

=== Aging ===
In older age, theory of mind capacities decline, irrespective of how exactly they are tested. However, the decline in other cognitive functions is even stronger, suggesting that social cognition is better preserved. In contrast to theory of mind, empathy shows no impairments in aging.

There are two kinds of theory of mind representations: cognitive (concerning mental states, beliefs, thoughts, and intentions) and affective (concerning the emotions of others). Cognitive theory of mind is further separated into first order (e.g., I think she thinks that) and second order (e.g. he thinks that she thinks that). There is evidence that cognitive and affective theory of mind processes are functionally independent from one another. In studies of Alzheimer's disease, which typically occurs in older adults, patients display impairment with second order cognitive theory of mind, but usually not with first order cognitive or affective theory of mind. However, it is difficult to discern a clear pattern of theory of mind variation due to age. There have been many discrepancies in the data collected thus far, likely due to small sample sizes and the use of different tasks that only explore one aspect of theory of mind. Many researchers suggest that theory of mind impairment is simply due to the normal decline in cognitive function.

=== Cultural variations ===
Researchers propose that five key aspects of theory of mind develop sequentially for all children between the ages of three and five: diverse desires, diverse beliefs, knowledge access, false beliefs, and hidden emotions. Australian, American, and European children acquire theory of mind in this exact order, and studies with children in Canada, India, Peru, Samoa, and Thailand indicate that they all pass the false belief task at around the same time, suggesting that children develop theory of mind consistently around the world.

However, children from Iran and China develop theory of mind in a slightly different order. Although they begin the development of theory of mind around the same time, toddlers from these countries understand knowledge access before Western children but take longer to understand diverse beliefs. Researchers believe this swap in the developmental order is related to the culture of collectivism in Iran and China, which emphasizes interdependence and shared knowledge as opposed to the culture of individualism in Western countries, which promotes individuality and accepts differing opinions. Because of these different cultural values, Iranian and Chinese children might take longer to understand that other people have different beliefs and opinions. This suggests that the development of theory of mind is not universal and solely determined by innate brain processes but also influenced by social and cultural factors.

== Empirical investigation ==
Whether children younger than three or four years old have a theory of mind is a topic of debate among researchers. It is a challenging question, due to the difficulty of assessing what prelinguistic children understand about others and the world. Tasks used in research into the development of theory of mind must take into account the umwelt of the pre-verbal child.

=== False-belief task ===
One of the most important milestones in theory of mind development is the ability to attribute false belief: in other words, to understand that other people can believe things which are not true. To do this, it is suggested, one must understand how knowledge is formed, that people's beliefs are based on their knowledge, that mental states can differ from reality, and that people's behavior can be predicted by their mental states. Numerous versions of false-belief task have been developed, based on the initial task created by Wimmer and Perner (1983).

In the most common version of the false-belief task (often called the Sally-Anne test), children are told a story about Sally and Anne. Sally has a marble, which she places into her basket, and then leaves the room. While she is out of the room, Anne takes the marble from the basket and puts it into the box. The child being tested is then asked where Sally will look for the marble once she returns. The child passes the task if they answer that Sally will look in the basket, where Sally put the marble; the child fails the task if they answer that Sally will look in the box. To pass the task, the child must be able to understand that another's mental representation of the situation is different from their own, and the child must be able to predict behavior based on that understanding. Another example depicts a boy who leaves chocolate on a shelf and then leaves the room. His mother puts it in the fridge. To pass the task, the child must understand that the boy, upon returning, holds the false belief that his chocolate is still on the shelf.

The results of research using false-belief tasks have been called into question: most typically developing children are able to pass the tasks from around age four. Yet early studies asserted that 80% of children diagnosed with autism were unable to pass this test, while children with other disabilities like Down syndrome were able to. However, this assertion could not be replicated by later studies. It instead was concluded that children fail these tests due to a lack of understanding of extraneous processes and a basic lack of mental processing capabilities.

Adults may also struggle with false beliefs, for instance when they show hindsight bias. In one experiment, adult subjects who were asked for an independent assessment were unable to disregard information on actual outcome. Also in experiments with complicated situations, when assessing others' thinking, adults can fail to correctly disregard certain information that they have been given.

=== Unexpected contents ===
Other tasks have been developed to try to extend the false-belief task. In the "unexpected contents" or "smarties" task, experimenters ask children what they believe to be the contents of a box that looks as though it holds Smarties chocolates. After the child guesses "Smarties", it is shown that the box in fact contained pencils. The experimenter then re-closes the box and asks the child what she thinks another person, who has not been shown the true contents of the box, will think is inside. The child passes the task if he/she responds that another person will think that "Smarties" exist in the box, but fails the task if she responds that another person will think that the box contains pencils. Gopnik & Astington found that children pass this test at age four or five years. Though the use of such implicit tests has yet to reach a consensus on their validity and reproducibility of study results.

=== Other tasks ===
The "false-photograph" task also measures theory of mind development. In this task, children must reason about what is represented in a photograph that differs from the current state of affairs. Within the false-photograph task, either a location or identity change exists. In the location-change task, the examiner puts an object in one location (e.g. chocolate in an open green cupboard), whereupon the child takes a Polaroid photograph of the scene. While the photograph is developing, the examiner moves the object to a different location (e.g. a blue cupboard), allowing the child to view the examiner's action. The examiner asks the child two control questions: "When we first took the picture, where was the object?" and "Where is the object now?" The subject is also asked a "false-photograph" question: "Where is the object in the picture?" The child passes the task if he/she correctly identifies the location of the object in the picture and the actual location of the object at the time of the question. However, the last question might be misinterpreted as "Where in this room is the object that the picture depicts?" and therefore some examiners use an alternative phrasing.

To make it easier for animals, young children, and individuals with classical autism to understand and perform theory of mind tasks, researchers have developed tests in which verbal communication is de-emphasized: some whose administration does not involve verbal communication on the part of the examiner, some whose successful completion does not require verbal communication on the part of the subject, and some that meet both of those standards. One category of tasks uses a preferential-looking paradigm, with looking time as the dependent variable. For instance, nine-month-old infants prefer looking at behaviors performed by a human hand over those made by an inanimate hand-like object. Other paradigms look at rates of imitative behavior, the ability to replicate and complete unfinished goal-directed acts, and rates of pretend play.

=== Early precursors ===
Research on the early precursors of theory of mind has invented ways to observe preverbal infants' understanding of other people's mental states, including perception and beliefs. Using a variety of experimental procedures, studies show that infants from their first year of life have an implicit understanding of what other people see and what they know. A popular paradigm used to study infants' theory of mind is the violation-of-expectation procedure, which exploits infants' tendency to look longer at unexpected and surprising events compared to familiar and expected events. The amount of time they look at an event gives researchers an indication of what infants might be inferring, or their implicit understanding of events. One study using this paradigm found that 16-month-olds tend to attribute beliefs to a person whose visual perception was previously witnessed as being "reliable", compared to someone whose visual perception was "unreliable". Specifically, 16-month-olds were trained to expect a person's excited vocalization and gaze into a container to be associated with finding a toy in the reliable-looker condition or an absence of a toy in the unreliable-looker condition. Following this training phase, infants witnessed, in an object-search task, the same persons searching for a toy either in the correct or incorrect location after they both witnessed the location of where the toy was hidden. Infants who experienced the reliable looker were surprised and therefore looked longer when the person searched for the toy in the incorrect location compared to the correct location. In contrast, the looking time for infants who experienced the unreliable looker did not differ for either search locations. These findings suggest that 16-month-old infants can differentially attribute beliefs about a toy's location based on the person's prior record of visual perception.

=== Methodological problems ===
With the methods used to test theory of mind, it has been experimentally shown that very simple robots that only react by reflexes and are not built to have any complex cognition at all can pass the tests for having theory of mind abilities that psychology textbooks assume to be exclusive to humans older than four or five years. Whether such a robot passes the test is influenced by completely non-cognitive factors such as placement of objects and the structure of the robot body influencing how the reflexes are conducted. It has therefore been suggested that theory of mind tests may not actually test cognitive abilities.

Furthermore, early research into theory of mind in autistic children is argued to constitute epistemological violence due to implicit or explicit negative and universal conclusions about autistic individuals being drawn from empirical data that viably supports other (non-universal) conclusions.

== Deficits ==
Theory of mind impairment, or mind-blindness, describes a difficulty someone would have with perspective-taking. Individuals with theory of mind impairment struggle to see phenomena from any other perspective than their own. Individuals who experience a theory of mind deficit have difficulty determining the intentions of others, lack understanding of how their behavior affects others, and have a difficult time with social reciprocity. Theory of mind deficits have been observed in people with autism spectrum disorders, schizophrenia, nonverbal learning disorder and along with people under the influence of alcohol and narcotics, sleep-deprived people, and people who are experiencing severe emotional or physical pain. Theory of mind deficits have also been observed in deaf children who are late signers (i.e. are born to hearing parents), but such a deficit is due to the delay in language learning, not any cognitive deficit, and therefore disappears once the child learns sign language.

=== Autism ===
In 1985 Simon Baron-Cohen, Alan M. Leslie, and Uta Frith suggested that children with autism do not employ theory of mind and that autistic children have particular difficulties with tasks requiring the child to understand another person's beliefs. These difficulties persist when children are matched for verbal skills and they have been taken as a key feature of autism. Although in a 2019 review, Gernsbacher and Yergeau argued that "the claim that autistic people lack a theory of mind is empirically questionable", as there have been numerous failed replications of classic ToM studies and the meta-analytical effect sizes of such replications were minimal to small.

Many individuals classified as autistic have severe difficulty assigning mental states to others, and some seem to lack theory of mind capabilities. Researchers who study the relationship between autism and theory of mind attempt to explain the connection in a variety of ways. One account assumes that theory of mind plays a role in the attribution of mental states to others and in childhood pretend play. According to Leslie, theory of mind is the capacity to mentally represent thoughts, beliefs, and desires, regardless of whether the circumstances involved are real. This might explain why some autistic individuals show extreme deficits in both theory of mind and pretend play. However, Hobson proposes a social-affective justification, in which deficits in theory of mind in autistic people result from a distortion in understanding and responding to emotions. He suggests that typically developing individuals, unlike autistic individuals, are born with a set of skills (such as social referencing ability) that later lets them comprehend and react to other people's feelings. Other scholars emphasize that autism involves a specific developmental delay, so that autistic children vary in their deficiencies, because they experience difficulty in different stages of growth. Very early setbacks can alter proper advancement of joint-attention behaviors, which may lead to a failure to form a full theory of mind.

It has been speculated that theory of mind exists on a continuum as opposed to the traditional view of a discrete presence or absence. While some research has suggested that some autistic populations are unable to attribute mental states to others, recent evidence points to the possibility of coping mechanisms that facilitate the attribution of mental states. A binary view regarding theory of mind contributes to the stigmatization of autistic adults who do possess perspective-taking capacity, as the assumption that autistic people do not have empathy can become a rationale for dehumanization.

Tine et al. report that autistic children score substantially lower on measures of social theory of mind (i.e., "reasoning about others' mental states", p. 1) in comparison to children diagnosed with Asperger syndrome. Although, Aspergers is an outdated condition typically linked to Autism.

Generally, children with more advanced theory of mind abilities display more advanced social skills, greater adaptability to new situations, and greater cooperation with others. As a result, these children are typically well-liked. However, "children may use their mind-reading abilities to manipulate, outwit, tease, or trick their peers." Individuals possessing inferior theory of mind skills, such as children with autism spectrum disorder, may be socially rejected by their peers since they are unable to communicate effectively. Social rejection has been proven to negatively impact a child's development and can put the child at greater risk of developing depressive symptoms.

Peer-mediated interventions (PMI) are a school-based treatment approach for children and adolescents with autism spectrum disorder in which peers are trained to be role models in order to promote social behavior. Laghi et al. studied whether analysis of prosocial (nice) and antisocial (nasty) theory-of-mind behaviors could be used, in addition to teacher recommendations, to select appropriate candidates for PMI programs. Selecting children with advanced theory-of-mind skills who use them in prosocial ways will theoretically make the program more effective. While the results indicated that analyzing the social uses of theory of mind of possible candidates for a PMI program may increase the program's efficacy, it may not be a good predictor of a candidate's performance as a role model.

A 2014 Cochrane review on interventions based on theory of mind found that such a theory could be taught to individuals with autism but claimed little evidence of skill maintenance, generalization to other settings, or development effects on related skills.

Some 21st-century studies have shown that the results of some studies of theory of mind tests on autistic people may be misinterpreted based on the double empathy problem, which proposes that rather than autistic people specifically having trouble with theory of mind, autistic people and non-autistic people have equal difficulty understanding one-another due to their neurological differences. Studies have shown that autistic adults perform better in theory of mind tests when paired with other autistic adults as well as possibly autistic close family members. Academics who acknowledge the double empathy problem also propose that it is likely autistic people understand non-autistic people to a higher degree than vice-versa, due to the necessity of functioning in a non-autistic society.

=== Psychopathy ===
Psychopathy is another deficit that is of large importance when discussing theory of mind. While psychopathic individuals show impaired emotional behavior including a lack of emotional responsiveness to others and deficient empathy, as well as impaired social behavior, there are many controversies regarding psychopathic individuals' theory of mind. Many different studies provide contradictory information on a correlation between theory of mind impairment and psychopathic individuals.

There have been some speculations made about the similarities between individuals with autism and psychopathic individuals in the theory of mind performance. In this study in 2008, the Happé's advanced test of theory of mind was presented to a group of 25 psychopaths, and 25 non-psychopaths incarcerated. This test showed that there was not a difference in the performance of the task for the psychopaths and non-psychopaths. However, they were able to see that the psychopaths were performing significantly better than the most highly able adult autistic population. This shows that there is not a similarity between individuals with autism and psychopathic individuals.

There have been repetitive suggestions regarding the possibility that a deficient or biased grasp of others' mental states, or theory of mind, could potentially contribute to antisocial behavior, aggression, and psychopathy. In one study named 'Reading the Mind in the Eyes', the participants view photographs of an individual's eye and had to attribute a mental state, or emotion, to the individual. This is an interesting test because Magnetic resonance imaging studies showed that this task produced increased activity in the dorsolateral prefrontal and the left medial frontal cortices, the superior temporal gyrus, and the left amygdala. There is extensive literature suggesting amygdala dysfunction in psychopathy however, this test shows that both groups of psychopathic and non-psychopathic adults performed equally well on the test. Thus, disregarding that there is not theory of mind impairment in psychopathic individuals.

In another study using a systemic review and meta-analysis, data was gathered from 42 different studies and found that psychopathic traits are associated with impairment in the theory of mind task performance. This relationship was not regulated by age, population, psychopathy measurement (self-report versus clinical checklist) or theory of mind task type (cognitive versus affective). This study used past studies to show that there is a relationship between psychopathic individuals and theory of mind impairments.

In 2009 a study was conducted to test whether impairment in the emotional aspects of theory of mind rather that the general theory of mind abilities may account for some of the impaired social behavior in psychopathy. This study involved criminal offenders diagnosed with antisocial personality disorder who had high psychopathy features, participants with localized lesions in the orbitofrontal cortex, participants with non-frontal lesions, and healthy control subjects. Subjects were tested with a task that examines affective versus cognitive theory of mind. They found that the individuals with psychopathy and those with orbitofrontal cortex lesions were both impaired on the affective theory of mind but not in cognitive theory of mind when compared to the control group.

=== Schizophrenia ===
Individuals diagnosed with schizophrenia can show deficits in theory of mind. Mirjam Sprong and colleagues investigated the impairment by examining 29 different studies, with a total of over 1,500 participants. This meta-analysis showed significant and stable deficit of theory of mind in people with schizophrenia. They performed poorly on false-belief tasks, which test the ability to understand that others can hold false beliefs about events in the world, and also on intention-inference tasks, which assess the ability to infer a character's intention from reading a short story. Schizophrenia patients with negative symptoms, such as lack of emotion, motivation, or speech, have the most impairment in theory of mind and are unable to represent the mental states of themselves and of others. Paranoid schizophrenic patients also perform poorly because they have difficulty accurately interpreting others' intentions. The meta-analysis additionally showed that IQ, gender, and age of the participants do not significantly affect the performance of theory of mind tasks.

Research suggests that impairment in theory of mind negatively affects clinical insight—the patient's awareness of their mental illness. Insight requires theory of mind; a patient must be able to adopt a third-person perspective and see the self as others do. A patient with good insight can accurately self-represent, by comparing himself with others and by viewing himself from the perspective of others. Insight allows a patient to recognize and react appropriately to his symptoms. A patient who lacks insight does not realize that he has a mental illness, because of his inability to accurately self-represent. Therapies that teach patients perspective-taking and self-reflection skills can improve abilities in reading social cues and taking the perspective of another person.

Research indicates that theory-of-mind deficit is a stable trait-characteristic rather than a state-characteristic of schizophrenia. The meta-analysis conducted by Sprong et al. showed that patients in remission still had impairment in theory of mind. This indicates that the deficit is not merely a consequence of the active phase of schizophrenia.

Schizophrenic patients' deficit in theory of mind impairs their interactions with others. Theory of mind is particularly important for parents, who must understand the thoughts and behaviors of their children and react accordingly. Dysfunctional parenting is associated with deficits in the first-order theory of mind, the ability to understand another person's thoughts, and in the second-order theory of mind, the ability to infer what one person thinks about another person's thoughts. Compared with healthy mothers, mothers with schizophrenia are found to be more remote, quiet, self-absorbed, insensitive, unresponsive, and to have fewer satisfying interactions with their children. They also tend to misinterpret their children's emotional cues, and often misunderstand neutral faces as negative. Activities such as role-playing and individual or group-based sessions are effective interventions that help the parents improve on perspective-taking and theory of mind. There is a strong association between theory of mind deficit and parental role dysfunction.

=== Alcohol use disorders ===
Impairments in theory of mind, as well as other social-cognitive deficits, are commonly found in people who have alcohol use disorders, due to the neurotoxic effects of alcohol on the brain, particularly the prefrontal cortex.

=== Depression and dysphoria ===
Individuals in a major depressive episode, a disorder characterized by social impairment, show deficits in theory of mind decoding. Theory of mind decoding is the ability to use information available in the immediate environment (e.g., facial expression, tone of voice, body posture) to accurately label the mental states of others. The opposite pattern, enhanced theory of mind, is observed in individuals vulnerable to depression, including those individuals with past major depressive disorder (MDD), dysphoric individuals, and individuals with a maternal history of MDD.

=== Developmental language disorder ===
Children diagnosed with developmental language disorder (DLD) exhibit much lower scores on reading and writing sections of standardized tests, yet have a normal nonverbal IQ. These language deficits can be any specific deficits in lexical semantics, syntax, or pragmatics, or a combination of multiple problems. Such children often exhibit poorer social skills than normally developing children, and seem to have problems decoding beliefs in others. A recent meta-analysis confirmed that children with DLD have substantially lower scores on theory of mind tasks compared to typically developing children. This strengthens the claim that language development is related to theory of mind.

== Brain mechanisms ==
=== In non autistic people ===
Research on theory of mind in autism led to the view that mentalizing abilities are subserved by dedicated mechanisms that can—in some cases—be impaired while general cognitive function remains largely intact.

Neuroimaging research supports this view, demonstrating specific brain regions are consistently engaged during theory of mind tasks. Positron emission tomography (PET) research on theory of mind, using verbal and pictorial story comprehension tasks, identifies a set of brain regions including the medial prefrontal cortex (mPFC), and area around posterior superior temporal sulcus (pSTS), and sometimes precuneus and amygdala/temporopolar cortex. Research on the neural basis of theory of mind has diversified, with separate lines of research focusing on the understanding of beliefs, intentions, and more complex properties of minds such as psychological traits.

Studies from Rebecca Saxe's lab at MIT, using a false-belief versus false-photograph task contrast aimed at isolating the mentalizing component of the false-belief task, have consistently found activation in the mPFC, precuneus, and temporoparietal junction (TPJ), right-lateralized. In particular, Saxe et al. proposed that the right TPJ (rTPJ) is selectively involved in representing the beliefs of others. Some debate exists, as the same rTPJ region is consistently activated during spatial reorienting of visual attention; Jean Decety from the University of Chicago and Jason Mitchell from Harvard thus propose that the rTPJ subserves a more general function involved in both false-belief understanding and attentional reorienting, rather than a mechanism specialized for social cognition. However, it is possible that the observation of overlapping regions for representing beliefs and attentional reorienting may simply be due to adjacent, but distinct, neuronal populations that code for each. The resolution of typical fMRI studies may not be good enough to show that distinct/adjacent neuronal populations code for each of these processes. In a study following Decety and Mitchell, Saxe and colleagues used higher-resolution fMRI and showed that the peak of activation for attentional reorienting is approximately 6–10 mm above the peak for representing beliefs. Further corroborating that differing populations of neurons may code for each process, they found no similarity in the patterning of fMRI response across space.

Using single-cell recordings in the human dorsomedial prefrontal cortex (dmPFC), researchers at MGH identified neurons that encode information about others' beliefs, which were distinct from self-beliefs, across different scenarios in a false-belief task. They further showed that these neurons could provide detailed information about others' beliefs, and could accurately predict these beliefs' verity. These findings suggest a prominent role of distinct neuronal populations in the dmPFC in theory of mind complemented by the TPJ and pSTS.

Functional imaging also illuminates the detection of mental state information in animations of moving geometric shapes similar to those used in Heider and Simmel (1944), which typical humans automatically perceive as social interactions laden with intention and emotion. Three studies found remarkably similar patterns of activation during the perception of such animations versus a random or deterministic motion control: mPFC, pSTS, fusiform face area (FFA), and amygdala were selectively engaged during the theory of mind condition. Another study presented subjects with an animation of two dots moving with a parameterized degree of intentionality (quantifying the extent to which the dots chased each other), and found that pSTS activation correlated with this parameter.

A separate body of research implicates the posterior superior temporal sulcus in the perception of intentionality in human action. This area is also involved in perceiving biological motion, including body, eye, mouth, and point-light display motion. One study found increased pSTS activation while watching a human lift his hand versus having his hand pushed up by a piston (intentional versus unintentional action). Several studies found increased pSTS activation when subjects perceive a human action that is incongruent with the action expected from the actor's context and inferred intention. Examples would be: a human performing a reach-to-grasp motion on empty space next to an object, versus grasping the object; a human shifting eye gaze toward empty space next to a checkerboard target versus shifting gaze toward the target; an unladen human turning on a light with his knee, versus turning on a light with his knee while carrying a pile of books; and a walking human pausing as he passes behind a bookshelf, versus walking at a constant speed. In these studies, actions in the "congruent" case have a straightforward goal, and are easy to explain in terms of the actor's intention. The incongruent actions, on the other hand, require further explanation (why would someone twist empty space next to a gear?), and apparently demand more processing in the STS. This region is distinct from the temporoparietal area activated during false belief tasks. pSTS activation in most of the above studies was largely right-lateralized, following the general trend in neuroimaging studies of social cognition and perception. Also right-lateralized are the TPJ activation during false belief tasks, the STS response to biological motion, and the FFA response to faces.

Neuropsychological evidence supports neuroimaging results regarding the neural basis of theory of mind. Studies with patients with a lesion of the frontal lobes and the temporoparietal junction of the brain (between the temporal lobe and parietal lobe) report that they have difficulty with some theory of mind tasks. This shows that theory of mind abilities are associated with specific parts of the human brain. However, the fact that the medial prefrontal cortex and temporoparietal junction are necessary for theory of mind tasks does not imply that these regions are specific to that function. TPJ and mPFC may subserve more general functions necessary for theory of mind.

Research by Vittorio Gallese, Luciano Fadiga, and Giacomo Rizzolatti shows that some sensorimotor neurons, referred to as mirror neurons and first discovered in the premotor cortex of rhesus monkeys, may be involved in action understanding. Single-electrode recording revealed that these neurons fired when a monkey performed an action, as well as when the monkey viewed another agent performing the same action. fMRI studies with human participants show brain regions (assumed to contain mirror neurons) that are active when one person sees another person's goal-directed action. These data led some authors to suggest that mirror neurons may provide the basis for theory of mind in the brain, and to support simulation theory-of-mind reading.

There is also evidence against a link between mirror neurons and theory of mind. First, macaque monkeys have mirror neurons but do not seem to have a 'human-like' capacity to understand theory of mind and belief. Second, fMRI studies of theory of mind typically report activation in the mPFC, temporal poles, and TPJ or STS, but those brain areas are not part of the mirror neuron system. Some investigators, like developmental psychologist Andrew Meltzoff and neuroscientist Jean Decety, believe that mirror neurons merely facilitate learning through imitation and may provide a precursor to the development of theory of mind. Others, like philosopher Shaun Gallagher, suggest that mirror-neuron activation, on a number of counts, fails to meet the definition of simulation as proposed by the simulation theory of mindreading.

=== In autism ===
Several neuroimaging studies have looked at the neural basis for theory of mind impairment in subjects with Asperger syndrome (an outdated condition associated with Autism) and high-functioning autism (HFA). The first PET study of theory of mind in autism (also the first neuroimaging study using a task-induced activation paradigm in autism) replicated a prior study in non autistic individuals, which employed a story-comprehension task. This study found displaced and diminished mPFC activation in subjects with autism. However, because the study used only six subjects with autism, and because the spatial resolution of PET imaging is relatively poor, these results should be considered preliminary.

A subsequent fMRI study scanned normally developing adults and adults with HFA while performing a "reading the mind in the eyes" task: viewing a photo of a human's eyes and choosing which of two adjectives better describes the person's mental state, versus a gender discrimination control. The authors found activity in orbitofrontal cortex, STS, and amygdala in normal subjects, and found less amygdala activation and abnormal STS activation in subjects with autism.

A more recent PET study looked at brain activity in individuals with HFA and Asperger (an outdated condition associated with Autism) syndrome while viewing Heider-Simmel animations (see above) versus a random motion control. In contrast to normally developing subjects, those with autism showed little STS or FFA activation, and less mPFC and amygdala activation. Activity in extrastriate regions V3 and LO was identical across the two groups, suggesting intact lower-level visual processing in the subjects with autism. The study also reported less functional connectivity between STS and V3 in the autism group. However, decreased temporal correlation between activity in STS and V3 would be expected simply from the lack of an evoked response in STS to intent-laden animations in subjects with autism. A more informative analysis would be to compute functional connectivity after regressing out evoked responses from all-time series.

A subsequent study, using the incongruent/congruent gaze-shift paradigm described above, found that in high-functioning adults with autism, posterior STS (pSTS) activation was undifferentiated while they watched a human shift gaze toward a target and then toward adjacent empty space. The lack of additional STS processing in the incongruent state may suggest that these subjects fail to form an expectation of what the actor should do given contextual information, or that feedback about the violation of this expectation does not reach STS. Both explanations involve an impairment or deficit in the ability to link eye gaze shifts with intentional explanations. This study also found a significant anticorrelation between STS activation in the incongruent-congruent contrast and social subscale score on the Autism Diagnostic Interview-Revised, but not scores on the other subscales.

An fMRI study demonstrated that the right temporoparietal junction (rTPJ) of higher-functioning adults with autism was not more selectively activated for mentalizing judgments when compared to physical judgments about self and other. rTPJ selectivity for mentalizing was also related to individual variation on clinical measures of social impairment: individuals whose rTPJ was increasingly more active for mentalizing compared to physical judgments were less socially impaired, while those who showed little to no difference in response to mentalizing or physical judgments were the most socially impaired. This evidence builds on work in typical development that suggests rTPJ is critical for representing mental state information, whether it is about oneself or others. It also points to an explanation at the neural level for the pervasive mind-blindness difficulties in autism that are evident throughout the lifespan.

=== In schizophrenia ===
The brain regions associated with theory of mind include the superior temporal gyrus (STS), the temporoparietal junction (TPJ), the medial prefrontal cortex (mPFC), the precuneus, and the amygdala. The reduced activity in the mPFC of individuals with schizophrenia is associated with theory of mind deficit and may explain impairments in social function among people with schizophrenia. Increased neural activity in mPFC is related to better perspective-taking, emotion management, and increased social functioning. Disrupted brain activities in areas related to theory of mind may increase social stress or disinterest in social interaction, and contribute to the social dysfunction associated with schizophrenia.

== Neurolinguistic basis ==
Research on the neural basis of theory of mind has identified some regions that are often involved in people's attribution of the thoughts, intentions, and beliefs of others. Rather than a singular "theory-of-mind cortex," findings point to a distributed network that is often described as a mentalizing system. Within this network, the right temporoparietal junction (rTPJ), the medial prefrontal cortex (mPFC), and the posterior cingulate cortex/precuneus (PCC) are each frequently implicated across many studies. These regions are not exclusively devoted to theory of mind, but they show a reliable affinity for tasks that require reasoning about mental states.

The rTPJ is often active during false-belief reasoning and other tasks that involve distinguishing another person's mental state from reality. Lesion work indicates that damage to this area can impair belief attribution while leaving many other cognitive abilities comparatively preserved. At the same time, some researchers have argued that the rTPJ also supports more general processes such as attentional reorienting, and that its apparent selectivity for mental-state reasoning may partly reflect how social information draws attention. This has contributed to ongoing debate about whether the rTPJ is primarily specialized for theory of mind or contributes more broadly to processing behaviorally relevant information.

The mPFC is engaged in a breadth of social-cognitive judgments, such as evaluations of motives, traits, and long-term goals. This region is often recruited in studies where participants must integrate contextual or emotional information in order to interpret another person's state of mind, and it also overlaps with networks involved in thinking about one's own traits and preferences. Some work suggests that dorsal and ventral portions of the mPFC may play different roles, such as distinguishing between self-focused and other-focused reflection, although the precise division of labor remains a topic of ongoing research.

The PCC and precuneus contribute to perspective-taking and the construction of internally generated scenarios. These regions often appear in studies where participants imagine alternative angles and attempt to see through another person's eyes. They form part of the default mode network, which tends to be active when people are engaged in internally oriented thought, including autobiographical memory and mental simulation. Their involvement in theory-of-mind tasks is sometimes interpreted as reflecting the need to simulate or "project" into another person's perspective.

=== Role of the posterior superior temporal sulcus (pSTS) ===
Another region that is sometimes discussed in the context of theory of mind is the posterior superior temporal sulcus (pSTS). This region is highly responsive to dynamic social cues, including gaze direction, biological motion, shifts in attention, and the interpretation of goal-directed action. Because these cues often provide the basis for inferring another person's intentions, the pSTS is considered part of a broader social-perceptual system that supplies information to the core mentalizing network. However, unlike the rTPJ, the pSTS does not consistently show belief-specific responses during classic false-belief tasks. Many researchers therefore view the pSTS as supporting the perceptual analysis of socially relevant behavior rather than explicit reasoning about mental states.

Some researchers have suggested that the pSTS may function as a bridge between perceptual and inferential levels of social understanding. By tracking subtle patterns in movement, gaze, and attention, the pSTS may help generate the "raw materials" from which higher-level regions construct mental-state interpretations. In this view, the pSTS does not encode beliefs or intentions directly, but it shapes the range of interpretations that the mentalizing network ultimately entertains. This perspective has spurred the idea that theory-of-mind reasoning may depend not only on specialized belief-attribution mechanisms but also on the quality and organization of the perceptual cues that the pSTS extracts during social interaction.

== Summary of neural regions ==
Region	Associated function	Evidence
Right temporoparietal junction (rTPJ)	Belief attribution, false-belief reasoning	fMRI, lesion studies
Medial prefrontal cortex (mPFC)	Social evaluation, trait and goal inference	fMRI
Posterior cingulate cortex / Precuneus	Perspective-taking, internal simulation	fMRI
Posterior superior temporal sulcus (pSTS)	Dynamic social cue processing, biological motion	fMRI
Inferior frontal gyrus (IFG)	Pragmatic inference, language–ToM interface	Aphasia studies, fMRI

== Language and theory of mind ==
A number of developmental studies suggest a link between language abilities and the emergence of theory of mind, although the relationship is not strictly one-to-one. Some forms of social understanding appear in infancy, before children speak, but more explicit success on standard false-belief tasks tends to emerge later. Children are more likely to pass these tasks after they acquire complement syntax, which enables them to understand sentences that embed one proposition inside another, such as "She thinks that the book is on the table." With this framework, it becomes possible to represent a discrepancy between what is true in the world and what a particular agent believes to be true.

Complement syntax is not the only factor, however. Longitudinal and cross-linguistic studies suggest that conversational experience—especially discourse about thoughts, wants, and feelings—also predicts later theory-of-mind performance. Children who hear more references to mental states in caregiver speech often show earlier gains on false-belief measures, even when overall language development is controlled. Findings from children with developmental language disorders and from deaf children with delayed exposure to a natural sign language support the idea that language provides a scaffold for explicit mental-state reasoning, particularly in situations where beliefs must be kept distinct from reality over time.

Pragmatic skills also contribute to theory-of-mind performance. The comprehension of indirect requests, sarcasm, and other nonliteral utterances typically involves drawing inferences about the speaker's beliefs, intentions, and assumptions about shared knowledge. Neuroimaging studies indicate that such tasks generally engage both classical language areas and regions involved in mental-state reasoning, including the TPJ. Clinical work further suggests that individuals with relatively intact grammar but impaired pragmatic abilities—such as some people on the autism spectrum—may struggle with these inferences, highlighting a partial separation between structural language skills and the ability to use language in a socially appropriate, mind-sensitive manner.

== Practical validity ==
Measures such as the Reading the Mind in the Eyes test (RME) have been widely used and accepted by experts as measures of ToM but systematic reviews of research have shown a lack of validity data. Higgins et al concluded that the validity of RME scores and research based on them are "largely unsubstantiated and uninterpretable". A 2025 metastudy concluded that indications of ToM for autistic and non-autistic populations changed significantly depending on what measures were used. Esther Navaro found a strong influence of fluid intelligence in tests of ToM. She suggested that, though ToM tasks are likely assessing something more specific than general cognitive ability, they are also not assessing a single, monolithic 'ToM' construct either. She proposed that ToM should not be considered a monolithic construct but "should instead be explored and measured as multiple domains."

== Evolution ==
The evolutionary origin of theory of mind remains obscure. While many theories make claims about its role in the development of human language and social cognition, few of them specify in detail any evolutionary neurophysiological precursors. One theory claims that theory of mind has its roots in two defensive reactions—immobilization stress and tonic immobility—which are implicated in the handling of stressful encounters and also figure prominently in mammalian child-rearing practice. Their combined effect seems capable of producing many of the hallmarks of theory of mind, such as eye-contact, gaze-following, inhibitory control, and intentional attributions.

== Non-human ==
=== In animals ===
An open question is whether non-human animals have a genetic endowment and social environment that allows them to acquire a theory of mind like human children do. This is a contentious issue because of the difficulty of inferring from animal behavior the existence of thinking or of particular thoughts, or the existence of a concept of self or self-awareness, consciousness, and qualia. One difficulty with non-human studies of theory of mind is the lack of sufficient numbers of naturalistic observations, giving insight into what the evolutionary pressures might be on a species' development of theory of mind.

Non-human research still has a major place in this field. It is especially useful in illuminating which nonverbal behaviors signify components of theory of mind, and in pointing to possible stepping points in the evolution of that aspect of social cognition. While it is difficult to study human-like theory of mind and mental states in species of whose potential mental states we have an incomplete understanding, researchers can focus on simpler components of more complex capabilities. For example, many researchers focus on animals' understanding of intention, gaze, perspective, or knowledge (of what another being has seen). A study that looked at understanding of intention in orangutans, chimpanzees, and children showed that all three species understood the difference between accidental and intentional acts.

Individuals exhibit theory of mind by extrapolating another's internal mental states from their observable behavior. So one challenge in this line of research is to distinguish this from more run-of-the-mill stimulus-response learning, with the other's observable behavior being the stimulus.

To date, most research on theory of mind in nonhuman animals has focused on chimpanzees, other great apes, and macaques, although additional species such as dogs, goats, lemurs, corvids, and tortoises have also been examined. Research in this area has expanded beyond captive settings to include wild and free-ranging populations. Studies of domestic dogs have reported evidence of sensitivity to the gaze and attentional states of others, capacities often described as precursors to theory of mind. Studies of plovers have reported preliminary evidence of sensitivity to others' attention.

There has been some controversy over the interpretation of evidence purporting to show theory of mind ability—or inability—in animals. For example, Povinelli et al. presented chimpanzees with the choice of two experimenters from whom to request food: one who had seen where food was hidden, and one who, by virtue of one of a variety of mechanisms (having a bucket or bag over his head, a blindfold over his eyes, or being turned away from the baiting) does not know, and can only guess. They found that the animals failed in most cases to differentially request food from the "knower". By contrast, Hare, Call, and Tomasello found that subordinate chimpanzees were able to use the knowledge state of dominant rival chimpanzees to determine which container of hidden food they approached. William Field and Sue Savage-Rumbaugh believe that bonobos have developed theory of mind, and cite their communications with a captive bonobo, Kanzi, as evidence.

In one experiment, ravens (Corvus corax) took into account visual access of unseen conspecifics. The researchers argued that "ravens can generalize from their own perceptual experience to infer the possibility of being seen".

Evolutionary anthropologist Christopher Krupenye studied the existence of theory of mind, and particularly false beliefs, in non-human primates.

Keren Haroush and Ziv Williams outlined the case for a group of neurons in primates' brains that uniquely predicted the choice selection of their interacting partner. These primates' neurons, located in the anterior cingulate cortex of rhesus monkeys, were observed using single-unit recording while the monkeys played a variant of the iterative prisoner's dilemma game. By identifying cells that represent the yet unknown intentions of a game partner, Haroush & Williams' study supports the idea that theory of mind may be a fundamental and generalized process, and suggests that anterior cingulate cortex neurons may act to complement the function of mirror neurons during social interchange.

=== Artificial intelligence ===
Progress in understanding theory of mind is influencing the design of artificial intelligence through AI responding to human emotions and intentions. This influence is increasing in fields such as healthcare, education, and customer service to foster more engaging and supportive experiences. While AI has achieved remarkable progress in areas such as medical diagnosis through "cold" cognition, it largely lacks the capacity to comprehend and predict human behavior influenced by social and emotional factors.

== See also ==
- Attribution bias
- Cephalopod intelligence
- Cetacean intelligence
- Eliminative materialism
- Empathy
- Folk psychology
- Grounding in communication
- Intentional stance
- Joint attention
- Mental body
- Mentalization
- Mini-SEA
- Origin of language
- Perspective-taking
- Quantum mind
- Relational frame theory
- Self-awareness
- Social neuroscience
- Embodied cognition
- Space mapping
- The Mind of an Ape
- Turing test
- Type physicalism
- Interpersonal accuracy
