= Valeria Gazzola =

Italian neuroscientist

Valeria Gazzola (born 19 January 1977) is an Italian neuroscientist, associate professor at the Faculty of Social and Behavioral Sciences at the University of Amsterdam (UvA) and member of the Young Academy of Europe. She is also a tenured department head at the Netherlands Institute for Neuroscience (NIN) in Amsterdam, where she leads her own research group and the Social Brain Lab together with neuroscientist Christian Keysers. She is a specialist in the neural basis of empathy and embodied cognition: Her research focusses on how the brain makes individuals sensitive to the actions and emotions of others and how this affects decision-making.

== Early life and education ==
Gazzola completed her Bachelor of Science at the University of Parma in Italy. Interested in science, she started studying physics, but realized after one year that she was even more interested in biology. She continued at the University of Parma for her Master of Science degree in 2003. Her experimental thesis in the Rizzolatti Laboratory under the supervision of Vittorio Gallese entitled “The role of the somatosensory cortices during the observation of the tactile stimulation of others” contributed to a publication in Neuron.

== Career and research ==
In early work, financed through a VENI grant from the Dutch Research Council (NWO), Gazzola established for the first time that somatosensory cortices, known to process tactile and proprioceptive information in the self, also play a necessary role in processing the actions and sensations of others. Using neuroimaging, she established that somatosensory regions are activated while witnessing the actions and sensations of others. She then used neuromodulatory tools to establish that these somatosensory cortices are necessary for the perception of the actions and pain of others. She then looked at incarcerated psychopathic criminals to show that people with increased antisocial behavior showed reduced activations in these regions while witnessing the pain of others, but could show that if asked to empathize, their activity normalizes, leading her to propose a mechanism that explains how the ability to empathize differs from the propensity to do so.

In later work, financed by an Innovational Research Incentives Scheme (VIDI) grant from the Dutch Research Council, Gazzola addressed how these systems influence behavior. She used electroencephalography (EEG) to show that activity in somatosensory cortices can predict how much a person will do to help others, and used transcranial direct current stimulation (tDCS) and transcranial magnetic stimulation (TMS), to show that altering that activity alters how much they do for others. She then also developed an animal model of helping, and showed that cingulate activity, involved in an animal's own pain as well as activated by the pain of others, is necessary for the animal's sensitivity to the pain of others and influences the animals willingness to help others. In parallel, she also brought our understanding of how we perceive the actions of others to a new level by combining functional magnetic resonance imaging (fMRI), TMS and cerebellar patients to show how somatosensory, premotor and cerebellar regions work together to transform the kinematics of observed actions into a perception of effort.

In her current work, financed by a European Research Council (ERC) grant, Gazzola investigates the question of whether and how, the insula and cingulate contribute to our decisions to help others if doing so is costly. For this project, she co-founded the Centre for Ultrasound Brain imaging (CUBE) together with groups from the Erasmus Medical Center and Delft University of Technology funded by the Dutch Research Council.

== Publications ==
Her most cited articles are:

- Keysers C, Wicker B, Gazzola V, Anton JL, Fogassi L, Gallese V. A touching sight: SII/PV activation during the observation and experience of touch. Neuron. 2004 Apr 22;42(2):335-46 (Cited 1141 times, according to Google Scholar
- Gazzola V, Aziz-Zadeh L, Keysers C. Empathy and the somatotopic auditory mirror system in humans. Current biology. 2006 Sep 19;16(18):1824-9.(Cited 1142 times, according to Google Scholar.)
- Keysers C, Kaas JH, Gazzola V. Somatosensation in social perception. Nature Reviews Neuroscience. 2010 Jun;11(6):417-28.(Cited 844 times, according to Google Scholar)
- Gazzola V, Rizzolatti G, Wicker B, Keysers C. The anthropomorphic brain: the mirror neuron system responds to human and robotic actions. Neuroimage. 2007 May 1;35(4):1674-84. (Cited 804 times, according to Google Scholar.)
- Keysers C, Gazzola V. Integrating simulation and theory of mind: from self to social cognition. Trends in cognitive sciences. 2007 May 1;11(5):194-6 (Cited 609 times, according to Google Scholar.)
- Keysers C, Gazzola V. Towards a unifying neural theory of social cognition. Progress in brain research. 2006 Jan 1;156:379-401.(Cited 511 times, according to Google Scholar.)

== Honors ==
- Member of the Young Academy of Europe (2016)
