= Intermodal mapping =

Biomedical framework

Typically researched in infants, intermodal mapping refers to the ability to gather information about a particular stimulus by integrating multiple senses. Researched by American psychologists Andrew N. Meltzoff and M. Keith Moore, this capability plays an underlying part in neonatal imitation (infant capacity to model observable adult behavior).

== Origin ==
Modern investigation into the field of neonatal imitation and intermodal modeling began with Meltzoff and Moore's seminal study in 1977, investigating 12 to 21-day-old infants and their ability to replicate adults' facial and manual gestures. They acknowledge opposing voices who argues replication of observed behaviors is "merely arousal of oral activity," with the evidence of imitation of three facial gestures and one manual gesture.

The history of the intermodal model began when Meltzoff and Moore defined it as an innate human ability, essential to imitation. They hypothesized intermodal mapping acted as a sequence in which an infant observes an adult's facial acts and creates a "supramodal" framework. With proprioceptive feedback, an infant can then distinguish whether their actions are equivalent to those they see. Therefore, stimuli are not necessarily restricted to a singular sense, but allow them to exist universally in the brain and integrate in ways to produce complex outcomes. This is illustrated specifically in how visual and proprioceptive systems (senses) integrate to aid imitation. Meltzoff and Moore's studies typically mirror the Headturn Preference Procedure (HPP) as they observe both behavior in relation to response time in infants.

== Criticism ==
Criticisms of this approach typically question the innate, or inborn, claims Meltzoff and Moore make. Overall, researchers doubt the possibility that infants have the inherent ability to observe and create their own sequence of movements producing the same "configurations" or actions of the adults they're modeling. In addition, critics question how the link between visual input and motor faculties can be made so early in the infant's development.

== Neurological explanation ==
Meltzoff and Moore describe a neurological explanation claiming mirror neurons as the true mechanism linking "sensory input from observed actions to motor programs." Found in the adult rhesus monkey cortex, similar areas in the human cortex are thought to also contain these neurons, although evidence is still debated. Theoretically, both the intermodal mapping model and mirror neurons function through automatic low-level processes meant to facilitate imitation. With Hebbian Theory in mind, mirror neurons cannot be innate. They could, however, gain responsiveness through "postnatal experience," which Meltzoff acknowledges as a part of the intermodal model's nature as an imitation mechanism.

== Replication ==
Several French institutions have involved themselves in this hypothesis and tested its relation to infants, specifically the Centre des Sciences du Goût et de l'Alimentation, Dijon, France; the Centre Emotion, Hôpital de la Salpêtrière, Paris, France, and the Unité de Psychiatrie Périnatale, Maternité Ambroise Paré, Bourg-La-Reine, France. In the Soussignan, et al. 2011 study "Human newborns match tongue protrusion of disembodied human and robotic mouths", researchers replicate the Meltzoff and Moore position with 2D stimuli. As a result, this research reinforces the intermodal mapping hypothesis, adding that repeated experience and associative sequence learning are crucial components to this hypothesis. However, other studies have failed to replicate Meltzoff and Moore's findings. Maurer, Stager, and Mondlock's study "Cross-modal transfer of shape is difficult to demonstrate in 1-month-olds" (1999) first criticized Meltzoff for "lacking important controls." Yet, after those were included, Maurer et al. (1999) failed to replicate Meltzoff's findings.
