= Mirror neuron =

Type of neuron associated with empathy

Mirror system

Identifiers
- MeSH: D059167

A mirror neuron is a neuron that fires both when an animal acts and when the animal observes the same action performed by another. Thus, the neuron "mirrors" the behavior of the other, as though the observer were itself acting. Mirror neurons are not always physiologically distinct from other types of neurons in the brain; their main differentiating factor is their response patterns. By this definition, such neurons have been directly observed in humans and other primates, as well as in certain bird species.

In humans, brain activity consistent with that of mirror neurons has been found in the premotor cortex, the supplementary motor area, the primary somatosensory cortex, and the inferior parietal cortex. The function of the mirror system in humans is a subject of much speculation. Birds have been shown to have imitative resonance behaviors and neurological evidence suggests the presence of some form of mirroring system. To date, no widely accepted neural or computational models have been put forward to describe how mirror neuron activity supports cognitive functions.

The subject of mirror neurons continues to generate intense debate, with some researchers expressing skepticism about various claims that have been made. In 2014, Philosophical Transactions of the Royal Society B published a special issue entirely devoted to mirror neuron research. Some researchers speculate that mirror systems may simulate observed actions, and thus contribute to theory of mind skills, while others relate mirror neurons to language abilities. Neuroscientists such as Marco Iacoboni have argued that mirror neuron systems in the human brain help humans understand the actions and intentions of other people. In addition, Iacoboni has argued that mirror neurons are the neural basis of the human capacity for emotions such as empathy.

== Discovery ==
In the 1980s and 1990s, neurophysiologists Giacomo Rizzolatti, Giuseppe Di Pellegrino, Luciano Fadiga, Leonardo Fogassi, and Vittorio Gallese at the University of Parma placed electrodes in the ventral premotor cortex of the macaque monkey to study neurons specialized in the control of hand and mouth actions; for example, taking hold of an object and manipulating it. During each experiment, the researchers allowed the monkey to reach for pieces of food, and recorded from single neurons in the monkey's brain, thus measuring the neuron's response to certain movements. They found that some neurons responded when the monkey observed a person picking up a piece of food, and also when the monkey itself picked up the food. The discovery was initially submitted to Nature, but was rejected for its "lack of general interest" before being published in a less competitive journal.

A few years later, the same group published another empirical paper, discussing the role of the mirror-neuron system in action recognition, and proposing that the human Broca's area was the homologue region of the monkey ventral premotor cortex. While these papers reported the presence of mirror neurons responding to hand actions, a subsequent study by Pier Francesco Ferrari and colleagues described the presence of mirror neurons responding to mouth actions and facial gestures.

Further experiments confirmed that about 10% of neurons in the monkey inferior frontal and inferior parietal cortex have "mirror" properties and give similar responses to performed hand actions and observed actions. In 2002 Christian Keysers and colleagues reported that, in both humans and monkeys, the mirror system also responds to the sound of actions.

Reports on mirror neurons have been widely published and confirmed with mirror neurons found in both inferior frontal and inferior parietal regions of the brain. Recently, evidence from functional neuroimaging strongly suggests that humans have similar mirror neurons systems: researchers have identified brain regions which respond during both action and observation of action. Not surprisingly, these brain regions include those found in the macaque monkey. However, functional magnetic resonance imaging (fMRI) can examine the entire brain at once and suggests that a much wider network of brain areas shows mirror properties in humans than previously thought. These additional areas include the somatosensory cortex and are thought to make the observer feel what it feels like to move in the observed way.

== Origin ==
Many implicitly assume that the mirroring function of mirror neurons is due primarily to heritable genetic factors and that the genetic predisposition to develop mirror neurons evolved because they facilitate action understanding. In contrast, a number of theoretical accounts argue that mirror neurons could simply emerge due to learned associations, including the Hebbian theory, the associative learning theory, and canalization. Another position explains neurophysiological processes in specific cases of interpersonal dynamics in which mirror neurons are observed. These cases of interpersonal dynamics correspond to the so-called mother-fetus neurocognitive model, in which local neuronal oscillations are synchronized through interference with the low-frequency electromagnetic field of the mother's heart.

== In monkeys ==
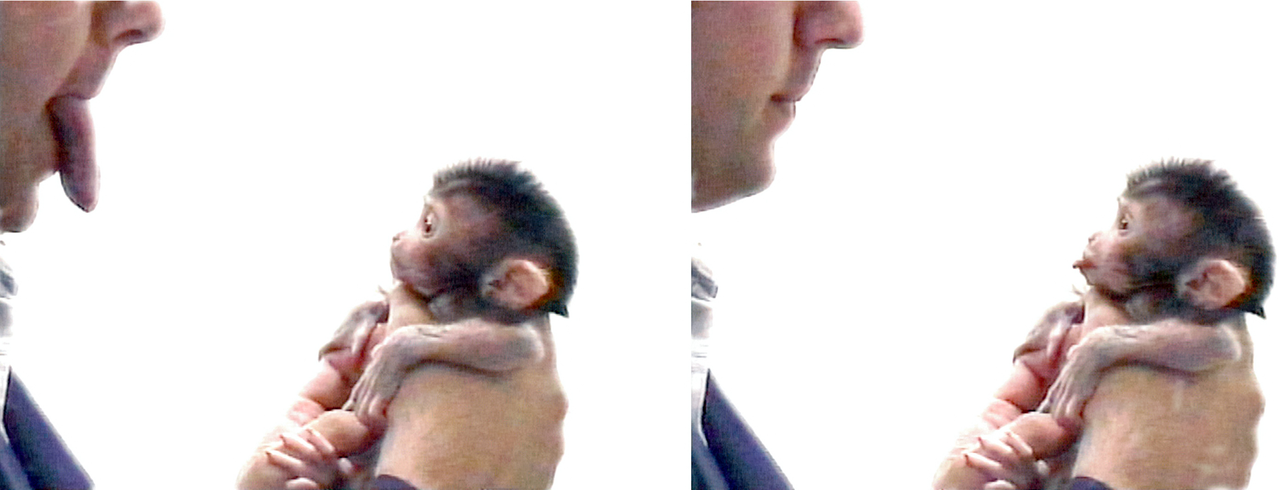
Neonatal (newborn) macaque imitating facial expressions

The first animal in which researchers have studied mirror neurons individually is the macaque monkey. In these monkeys, mirror neurons are found in the inferior frontal gyrus (region F5) and the inferior parietal lobule.

Mirror neurons are believed to mediate the understanding of other animals' behaviour. For example, a mirror neuron which fires when the monkey rips a piece of paper would also fire when the monkey sees a person rip paper, or hears paper ripping (without visual cues). These properties have led researchers to believe that mirror neurons encode abstract concepts of actions like 'ripping paper', whether the action is performed by the monkey or another animal.

The function of mirror neurons in macaques remains unknown. Adult macaques do not seem to learn by imitation. Recent experiments by Ferrari and colleagues suggest that infant macaques can imitate a human's face movements, though only as neonates and during a limited temporal window. Even if it has not yet been empirically demonstrated, it has been proposed that mirror neurons cause this behaviour and other imitative phenomena. Indeed, there is limited understanding of the degree to which monkeys show imitative behaviour.

In adult monkeys, mirror neurons may enable the monkey to understand what another monkey is doing, or to recognize the other monkey's action.

== In rodents ==
A number of studies have shown that rats and mice show signs of distress while witnessing another rodent receive footshocks. The group of Christian Keysers's recorded from neurons while rats experienced pain or witnessed the pain of others, and has revealed the presence of pain mirror neurons in the rat's anterior cingulate cortex, i.e. neurons that respond both while an animal experiences pain and while witnessing the pain of others. Deactivating this region of the cingulate cortex led to reduced emotional contagion in the rats, so that observer rats showed reduced distress while witnessing another rat experience pain. The homologous part of the anterior cingulate cortex has been associated with empathy for pain in humans, suggesting a homology between the systems involved in emotional contagion in rodents and empathy/emotional contagion for pain in humans.

== In humans ==
Diagram of the brain, showing the locations of the frontal and parietal lobes of the cerebrum, viewed from the left. The inferior frontal lobe is the lower part of the blue area, and the superior parietal lobe is the upper part of the yellow area.

It is not normally possible to study single neurons in the human brain, so most evidence for mirror neurons in humans is indirect. Brain imaging experiments using functional magnetic resonance imaging (fMRI) have shown that the human inferior frontal cortex and superior parietal lobe are active when the person performs an action and also when the person sees another individual performing an action. It has been suggested that these brain regions contain mirror neurons, and they have been defined as the human mirror neuron system. More recent experiments have shown that even at the level of single participants, scanned using fMRI, large areas containing multiple fMRI voxels increase their activity both during the observation and execution of actions.

Neuropsychological studies looking at lesion areas that cause action knowledge, pantomime interpretation, and biological motion perception deficits have pointed to a causal link between the integrity of the inferior frontal gyrus and these behaviours. Transcranial magnetic stimulation studies have confirmed this as well. These results indicate the activation in mirror neuron related areas are unlikely to be just epiphenomenal.

A study published in April 2010 reports recordings from single neurons with mirror properties in the human brain. Mukamel et al. (Current Biology, 2010) recorded from the brains of 21 patients who were being treated at Ronald Reagan UCLA Medical Center for intractable epilepsy. The patients had been implanted with intracranial depth electrodes to identify seizure foci for potential surgical treatment. Electrode location was based solely on clinical criteria; the researchers, with the patients' consent, used the same electrodes to "piggyback" their research. The researchers found a small number of neurons that fired or showed their greatest activity both when the individual performed a task and when they observed a task. Other neurons had anti-mirror properties: they responded when the participant performed an action, but were inhibited when the participant saw that action.

The mirror neurons found were located in the supplementary motor area and medial temporal cortex (other brain regions were not sampled). For purely practical reasons, these regions are not the same as those in which mirror neurons had been recorded from in the monkey: researchers in Parma were studying the ventral premotor cortex and the associated inferior parietal lobe, two regions in which epilepsy rarely occurs, and hence, single cell recordings in these regions are not usually done in humans. On the other hand, no one has to date looked for mirror neurons in the supplementary motor area or the medial temporal lobe in the monkey. Together, this therefore does not suggest that humans and monkeys have mirror neurons in different locations, but rather that they may have mirror neurons both in the ventral premotor cortex and inferior parietal lobe, where they have been recorded in the monkey, and in the supplementary motor areas and medial temporal lobe, where they have been recorded from in human – especially because detailed human fMRI analyses suggest activity compatible with the presence of mirror neurons in all these regions.

Another study has suggested that human beings do not necessarily have more mirror neurons than monkeys, but instead that there is a core set of mirror neurons used in action observation and execution. However, for other proposed functions of mirror neurons the mirror system may have the ability to recruit other areas of the brain when doing its auditory, somatosensory, and affective components.

=== Development ===
Human infant data using eye-tracking measures suggest that the mirror neuron system develops before 12 months of age and that this system may help human infants understand other people's actions. A critical question concerns how mirror neurons acquire mirror properties. Two closely related models postulate that mirror neurons are trained through Hebbian or Associative learning (see Associative Sequence Learning). However, if premotor neurons need to be trained by action in order to acquire mirror properties, it is unclear how newborn babies are able to mimic the facial gestures of another person (imitation of unseen actions), as suggested by the work of Meltzoff and Moore. One possibility is that the sight of tongue protrusion recruits an innate releasing mechanism in neonates. Careful analysis suggests that 'imitation' of this single gesture may account for almost all reports of facial mimicry by new-born infants.

== Possible functions ==
=== Understanding intentions ===
Many studies link mirror neurons to understanding goals and intentions. Fogassi et al. (2005) recorded the activity of 41 mirror neurons in the inferior parietal lobe (IPL) of two rhesus macaques. The IPL has long been recognized as an association cortex that integrates sensory information. The monkeys watched an experimenter either grasp an apple and bring it to his mouth or grasp an object and place it in a cup.

- In total, 15 mirror neurons fired vigorously when the monkey observed the "grasp-to-eat" motion, but registered no activity while exposed to the "grasp-to-place" condition.
- For 4 other mirror neurons, the reverse held true: they activated in response to the experimenter eventually placing the apple in the cup but not to eating it.

Only the type of action, and not the kinematic force with which models manipulated objects, determined neuron activity. It was also significant that neurons fired before the monkey observed the human model starting the second motor act (bringing the object to the mouth or placing it in a cup). Therefore, IPL neurons "code the same act (grasping) in a different way according to the final goal of the action in which the act is embedded." They may furnish a neural basis for predicting another individual's subsequent actions and inferring intention.

Understanding intention can be broken down into various stages such as body perception and action identification. These stages correlate with various regions of the brain, for example for body parts/shapes match with the extrastriate and fusiform body areas of the brain. The action itself is identified and facilitated by the mirror neuron system. Action understanding falls into two different processing levels, the mirror neuron system and the mentalizing system. Expected actions are primarily processed by the mirror neuron system and unexpected actions are processed by a combination of the mirror neuron system and the mentalizing system.

=== Learning facilitation ===
Another possible function of mirror neurons would be facilitation of learning. The mirror neurons code the concrete representation of the action, i.e., the representation that would be activated if the observer acted. This would allow us to simulate (to repeat internally) the observed action implicitly (in the brain) to collect our own motor programs of observed actions and to get ready to reproduce the actions later. It is implicit training. Due to this, the observer will produce the action explicitly (in his/her behavior) with agility and finesse. This happens due to associative learning processes. The more frequently a synaptic connection is activated, the stronger it becomes.

=== Empathy ===
Stephanie Preston and Frans de Waal, Jean Decety, and Vittorio Gallese and Christian Keysers have each independently argued that the mirror neuron system is involved in human empathy. A large number of experiments using fMRI, electroencephalography (EEG) and magnetoencephalography (MEG) have shown that certain brain regions (in particular the anterior insula, anterior cingulate cortex, and inferior frontal cortex) are active when people experience an emotion (disgust, happiness, pain, etc.) and when they see another person experiencing an emotion. David Freedberg and Vittorio Gallese have also put forward the idea that this function of the mirror neuron system is crucial for aesthetic experiences.

Nevertheless, an experiment aimed at investigating the activity of mirror neurons in empathy conducted by Soukayna Bekkali and Peter Enticott at the University of Deakin yielded a different result. After analyzing the report's data, they came up with two conclusions about motor empathy and emotional empathy. First, there is no relationship between motor empathy and the activity of mirror neurons. Second, there is only weak evidence of these neurons' activity in the inferior frontal gyrus (IFG), and no evidence of emotional empathy associated with mirror neurons in key brain regions (inferior parietal lobule: IPL). In other words, there has not been an exact conclusion about the role of mirror neurons in empathy and if they are essential for human empathy. However, these brain regions are not quite the same as the ones which mirror hand actions, and mirror neurons for emotional states or empathy have not yet been described in monkeys.

In a recent study, done in 2022, sixteen hand actions were given for each assignment. The assignment pictured both an activity word phase and the intended word phase. The hand actions were selected in "trails" each introduced twice. One of the times was with a matching phase and the other time was with a misleading word phase. The action words were depicted in two to three words with each beginning with the word "to". For instance, "to point" (action) or "to spin" (intention).

Participants were expected to answer whether the correct word phase matched the corresponding action or intention word. The word phase had to be answered within 3000 ms, with a 1000 ms black screen between each image. The black screens purpose was for an adequate amount of time in between responses. Participants pressed on the keyboard "x" or "m" to indicate their responses in a yes/no format.

Christian Keysers at the Social Brain Lab and colleagues have shown that people who are more empathic according to self-report questionnaires have stronger activations both in the mirror system for hand actions and the mirror system for emotions, providing more direct support for the idea that the mirror system is linked to empathy. Some researchers observed that the human mirror system does not passively respond to the observation of actions but is influenced by the mindset of the observer. Researchers observed the link of the mirror neurons during empathetic engagement in patient care.

Studies in rats have shown that the anterior cingulate cortex contains mirror neurons for pain, i.e. neurons responding both during the first-hand experience of pain and while witnessing the pain of others, and inhibition of this region leads to reduced emotional contagion in rats and mice, and reduced aversion towards harming others. This provides causal evidence for a link between pain mirror neurons, and emotional contagion and prosocial behavior, two phenomena associated with empathy, in rodents. That brain activity in the homologous brain region is associated with individual variability in empathy in humans suggests that a similar mechanism may be at play across mammalian species.

=== Human self awareness ===
V. S. Ramachandran has speculated that mirror neurons may provide the neurological basis of human self-awareness. In an essay written for the Edge Foundation in 2009 Ramachandran gave the following explanation of his theory: "... I also speculated that these neurons can not only help simulate other people's behavior but can be turned 'inward'—as it were—to create second-order representations or meta-representations of your own earlier brain processes. This could be the neural basis of introspection, and of the reciprocity of self awareness and other awareness. There is obviously a chicken-or-egg question here as to which evolved first, but... The main point is that the two co-evolved, mutually enriching each other to create the mature representation of self that characterizes modern humans."

=== Language ===
In humans, functional MRI studies have reported finding areas homologous to the monkey mirror neuron system in the inferior frontal cortex, close to Broca's area, one of the hypothesized language regions of the brain. This has led to suggestions that human language evolved from a gesture performance/understanding system implemented in mirror neurons. Mirror neurons have been said to have the potential to provide a mechanism for action-understanding, imitation-learning, and the simulation of other people's behaviour. This hypothesis is supported by some cytoarchitectonic homologies between monkey premotor area F5 and human Broca's area. Rates of vocabulary expansion link to the ability of children to vocally mirror non-words and so to acquire the new word pronunciations. Such speech repetition occurs automatically, fast and separately in the brain to speech perception. Moreover, such vocal imitation can occur without comprehension such as in speech shadowing and echolalia.

Further evidence for this link comes from an earlier study in which the brain activity of two participants was measured using fMRI while they were gesturing words to each other using hand gestures with a game of charades – a modality that some have suggested might represent the evolutionary precursor of human language. Analysis of the data using Granger Causality revealed that the mirror-neuron system of the observer indeed reflects the pattern of activity in the motor system of the sender, supporting the idea that the motor concept associated with the words is indeed transmitted from one brain to another using the mirror system More recent evidence suggests that language comprehension and speech production rely on partially shared neural representations. A study of conversational processing demonstrated shared representational structures across language comprehension and generation, while human intracranial recordings have further identified prefrontal neurons that are active during both listening and speaking.

Building on these findings, recent theoretical work has proposed that mirror-neuron mechanisms involved in language may also be interpreted within predictive world model frameworks. According to this view, neural circuits acquired through predictive language processing are reused for language comprehension and language generation.

The mirror neuron system seems to be inherently inadequate to play any role in syntax, given that this definitory property of human languages which is implemented in hierarchical recursive structure is flattened into linear sequences of phonemes making the recursive structure not accessible to sensory detection

=== Imitation ===
The term is commonly used to refer to cases in which an individual, having observed a body movement, unintentionally performs a similar body movement or alters the way that a body movement is performed. Automatic imitation rarely involves overt execution of matching responses. Instead, the effects typically consist of reaction time, rather than accuracy, and differences between compatible and incompatible trials. Research reveals that the existence of automatic imitation, which is a covert form of imitation, is distinct from spatial compatibility. It also indicates that, although automatic imitation is subject to input modulation by attentional processes, and output modulation by inhibitory processes, it is mediated by learned, long-term sensorimotor associations that cannot be altered directly by intentional processes. Many researchers believe that automatic imitation is mediated by the mirror neuron system. Additionally, there are data that demonstrate that our postural control is impaired when people listen to sentences about other actions. For example, if the task is to maintain posture, people do it worse when they listen to sentences like this: "I get up, put on my slippers, go to the bathroom." This phenomenon may be due to the fact that during action perception there is similar motor cortex activation as if a human being performed the same action (mirror neurons system).

=== Motor mimicry ===
In contrast with automatic imitation, motor mimicry is observed in (1) naturalistic social situations and (2) via measures of action frequency within a session rather than measures of speed and/or accuracy within trials.

The integration of research on motor mimicry and automatic imitation could reveal plausible indications that these phenomena depend on the same psychological and neural processes. Preliminary evidence however comes from studies showing that social priming has similar effects on motor mimicry.

Nevertheless, the similarities between automatic imitation, mirror effects, and motor mimicry have led some researchers to propose that automatic imitation is mediated by the mirror neuron system and that it is a tightly controlled laboratory equivalent of the motor mimicry observed in naturalistic social contexts. If true, then automatic imitation can be used as a tool to investigate how the mirror neuron system contributes to cognitive functioning and how motor mimicry promotes prosocial attitudes and behavior.

Meta-analysis of imitation studies in humans suggest that there is enough evidence of mirror system activation during imitation that mirror neuron involvement is likely, even though no published studies have recorded the activities of singular neurons. However, it is likely insufficient for motor imitation. Studies show that regions of the frontal and parietal lobes that extend beyond the classical mirror system are equally activated during imitation. This suggests that other areas, along with the mirror system are crucial to imitation behaviors.

=== Autism ===
It has also been proposed that problems with the mirror neuron system may underlie cognitive disorders, particularly autism. However the connection between mirror neuron dysfunction and autism is tentative and it remains to be demonstrated how mirror neurons are related to many of the important characteristics of autism.

Some researchers claim there is a link between mirror neuron deficiency and autism. EEG recordings from motor areas are suppressed when someone watches another person move, a signal that may relate to mirror neuron system. Additionally, the correlation can be measured with eye-movement tracking of biological motions, together with EEG recordings, mu suppression index can be calculated. This suppression was less in children with autism. Although these findings have been replicated by several groups, other studies have not found evidence of a dysfunctional mirror neuron system in autism. In 2008, Oberman et al. published a research paper that presented conflicting EEG evidence. Oberman and Ramachandran found typical mu-suppression for familiar stimuli, but not for unfamiliar stimuli, leading them to conclude that the mirror neuron system of children with ASD (Autism Spectrum Disorder) was functional, but less sensitive than that of typical children. Based on the conflicting evidence presented by mu-wave suppression experiments, Patricia Churchland has cautioned that mu-wave suppression results cannot be used as a valid index for measuring the performance of mirror neuron systems. Recent research indicates that mirror neurons do not play a role in autism:

...no clear cut evidence emerges for a fundamental mirror system deficit in autism. Behavioural studies have shown that people with autism have a good understanding of action goals. Furthermore, two independent neuroimaging studies have reported that the parietal component of the mirror system is functioning typically in individuals with autism.

Some anatomical differences have been found in the mirror neuron related brain areas in adults with autism spectrum disorders, compared to non-autistic adults. All these cortical areas were thinner and the degree of thinning was correlated with autism symptom severity, a correlation nearly restricted to these brain regions. Based on these results, some researchers claim that autism is caused by impairments in the mirror neuron system, leading to disabilities in social skills, imitation, empathy and theory of mind.

Many researchers have pointed out that the "broken mirrors" theory of autism is overly simplistic, and mirror neurons alone cannot explain the differences found in individuals with autism. First of all, as noted above, none of these studies were direct measures of mirror neuron activity - in other words fMRI activity or EEG rhythm suppression do not unequivocally index mirror neurons. Dinstein and colleagues found normal mirror neuron activity in people with autism using fMRI. In individuals with autism, deficits in intention understanding, action understanding and biological motion perception (the key functions of mirror neurons) are not always found, or are task dependent. Today, very few people believe an all-or-nothing problem with the mirror system can underlie autism. Instead, "additional research needs to be done, and more caution should be used when reaching out to the media."

Research from 2010 concluded that autistic individuals do not exhibit mirror neuron dysfunction, although the small sample size limits the extent to which these results can be generalized. A more recent review argued there was not enough neurological evidence to support this "broken-mirror theory" of autism.

=== Theory of mind ===
In Philosophy of mind, mirror neurons have become the primary rallying call of simulation theorists concerning our "theory of mind." "Theory of mind" refers to our ability to infer another person's mental state (i.e., beliefs and desires) from experiences or their behaviour.

There are several competing models which attempt to account for our theory of mind; the most notable in relation to mirror neurons is simulation theory. According to simulation theory, theory of mind is available because we subconsciously empathize with the person we're observing and, accounting for relevant differences, imagine what we would desire and believe in that scenario. Mirror neurons have been interpreted as the mechanism by which we simulate others in order to better understand them, and therefore their discovery has been taken by some as a validation of simulation theory (which appeared a decade before the discovery of mirror neurons). More recently, Theory of Mind and Simulation have been seen as complementary systems, with different developmental time courses.

At the neuronal-level, in a 2015 study by Keren Haroush and Ziv Williams using jointly interacting primates performing an iterated prisoner's dilemma game, the authors identified neurons in the anterior cingulate cortex that selectively predicted an opponent's yet unknown decisions or covert state of mind. These "other-predictive neurons" differentiated between self and other decisions and were uniquely sensitive to social context, but they did not encode the opponent's observed actions or receipt of reward. These cingulate cells may therefore importantly complement the function of mirror neurons by providing additional information about other social agents that is not immediately observable or known.

=== Sex differences ===
A series of recent studies conducted by Yawei Cheng, using a variety of neurophysiological measures, including MEG, spinal reflex excitability, electroencephalography, have documented the presence of a gender difference in the human mirror neuron system, with female participants exhibiting stronger motor resonance than male participants.

In another study, sex-based differences among mirror neuron mechanisms was reinforced in that the data showed enhanced empathetic ability in females relative to males. During an emotional social interaction, females showed a greater ability in emotional perspective taking than did males when interacting with another person face-to-face. However, in the study, data showed that when it came to recognizing the emotions of others, all participants' abilities were very similar and there was no key difference between the male and female subjects.

=== Sleep paralysis ===
Baland Jalal and V. S. Ramachandran have hypothesized that the mirror neuron system is important in giving rise to the intruder hallucination and out-of-body experiences during sleep paralysis. According to this theory, sleep paralysis leads to disinhibition of the mirror neuron system, paving the way for hallucinations of human-like shadowy beings. The deafferentation of sensory information during sleep paralysis is proposed as the mechanism for such mirror neuron disinhibition. The authors suggest that their hypothesis on the role of the mirror neuron system could be tested:

"These ideas could be explored using neuroimaging, to examine the selective activation of brain regions associated with mirror neuron activity, when the individual is hallucinating an intruder or having an out-of-body experience during sleep paralysis ."

=== Mirror neuron function, psychosis, and empathy in schizophrenia ===
Recent research, which measured mu-wave suppression, suggests that mirror neuron activity is positively correlated with psychotic symptoms (i.e., greater mu suppression/mirror neuron activity was highest among subjects with the greater severity of psychotic symptoms). Researchers concluded that "higher mirror neuron activity may be the underpinning of schizophrenia sensory gating deficits and may contribute to sensory misattributions particularly in response to socially relevant stimuli, and be a putative mechanism for delusions and hallucinations."

== Doubts concerning mirror neurons ==
Although some in the scientific community have expressed excitement about the discovery of mirror neurons, there are scientists who have expressed doubts about both the existence and role of mirror neurons in humans. According to scientists such as Hickok, Pascolo, and Dinstein, it is not clear whether mirror neurons really form a distinct class of cells (as opposed to an occasional phenomenon seen in cells that have other functions), and whether mirror activity is a distinct type of response or simply an artifact of an overall facilitation of the motor system.

In 2008, Ilan Dinstein et al. argued that the original analyses were unconvincing because they were based on qualitative descriptions of individual cell properties, and did not take into account the small number of strongly mirror-selective neurons in motor areas. Other scientists have argued that the measurements of neuron fire delay seem not to be compatible with standard reaction times, and pointed out that nobody has reported that an interruption of the motor areas in F5 would produce a decrease in action recognition. Critics of this argument have replied that these authors have missed human neuropsychological and TMS studies reporting disruption of these areas do indeed cause action deficits without affecting other kinds of perception.

In 2009, Lingnau et al. carried out an experiment in which they compared motor acts that were first observed and then executed to motor acts that were first executed and then observed. They concluded that there was a significant asymmetry between the two processes that indicated that mirror neurons do not exist in humans. They stated "Crucially, we found no signs of adaptation for motor acts that were first executed and then observed. Failure to find cross-modal adaptation for executed and observed motor acts is not compatible with the core assumption of mirror neuron theory, which holds that action recognition and understanding are based on motor simulation." However, in the same year, Kilner et al. showed that if goal directed actions are used as stimuli, both IPL and premotor regions show the repetition suppression between observation and execution that is predicted by mirror neurons.

In 2009, Greg Hickok published an extensive argument against the claim that mirror neurons are involved in action-understanding: "Eight Problems for the Mirror Neuron Theory of Action Understanding in Monkeys and Humans." He concluded that "The early hypothesis that these cells underlie action understanding is likewise an interesting and prima facie reasonable idea. However, despite its widespread acceptance, the proposal has never been adequately tested in monkeys, and in humans there is strong empirical evidence, in the form of physiological and neuropsychological (double-) dissociations, against the claim."

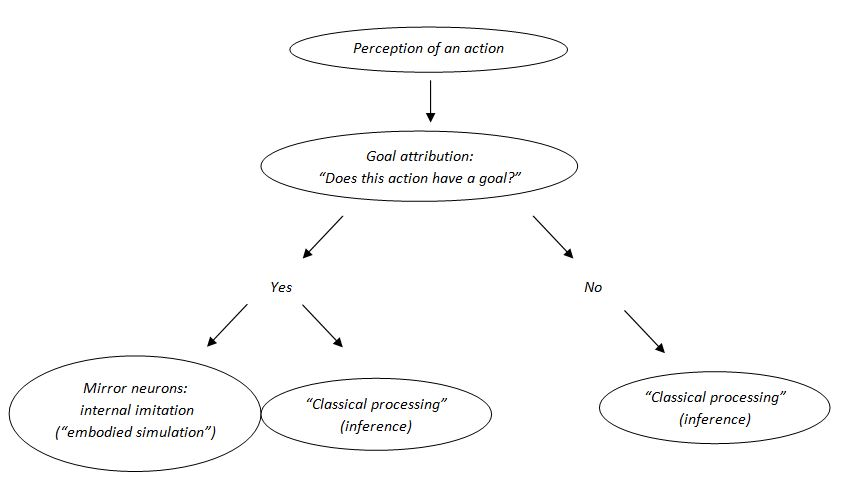
The mirror neurons can be activated only after the goal of the observed action has been attributed by other brain structures.

Vladimir Kosonogov sees another contradiction. The proponents of mirror neuron theory of action understanding postulate that the mirror neurons code the goals of others' actions because they are activated if the observed action is goal-directed. However, the mirror neurons are activated only when the observed action is goal-directed (object-directed action or a communicative gesture, which certainly has a goal too). How do they "know" that the definite action is goal-directed? At what stage of their activation do they detect a goal of the movement or its absence? In his opinion, the mirror neuron system can be activated only after the goal of the observed action is attributed by some other brain structures.

Neurophilosophers such as Patricia Churchland have expressed both scientific and philosophical objections to the theory that mirror neurons are responsible for understanding the intentions of others. In chapter 5 of her 2011 book, Braintrust, Churchland points out that the claim that mirror neurons are involved in understanding intentions (through simulating observed actions) is based on assumptions that are clouded by unresolved philosophical issues. She makes the argument that intentions are understood (coded) at a more complex level of neural activity than that of individual neurons. Churchland states that "A neuron, though computationally complex, is just a neuron. It is not an intelligent homunculus. If a neural network represents something complex, such as an intention [to insult], it must have the right input and be in the right place in the neural circuitry to do that."

Cecilia Heyes has advanced the theory that mirror neurons are the byproduct of associative learning as opposed to evolutionary adaptation. She argues that mirror neurons in humans are the product of social interaction and not an evolutionary adaptation for action-understanding. In particular, Heyes rejects the theory advanced by V.S. Ramachandran that mirror neurons have been "the driving force behind the great leap forward in human evolution."

== See also ==
- Associative sequence learning
- Common coding theory
- Mirror-touch synesthesia
- Mirroring (psychology)
- Mob psychology
- Motor cognition
- Motor theory of speech perception
- On Intelligence
- Positron emission tomography
- Simulation theory of empathy
- Speech repetition
- Spindle neuron
