= Netherlands Institute for Neuroscience =

Dutch research institute

- Nederlands Herseninstituut

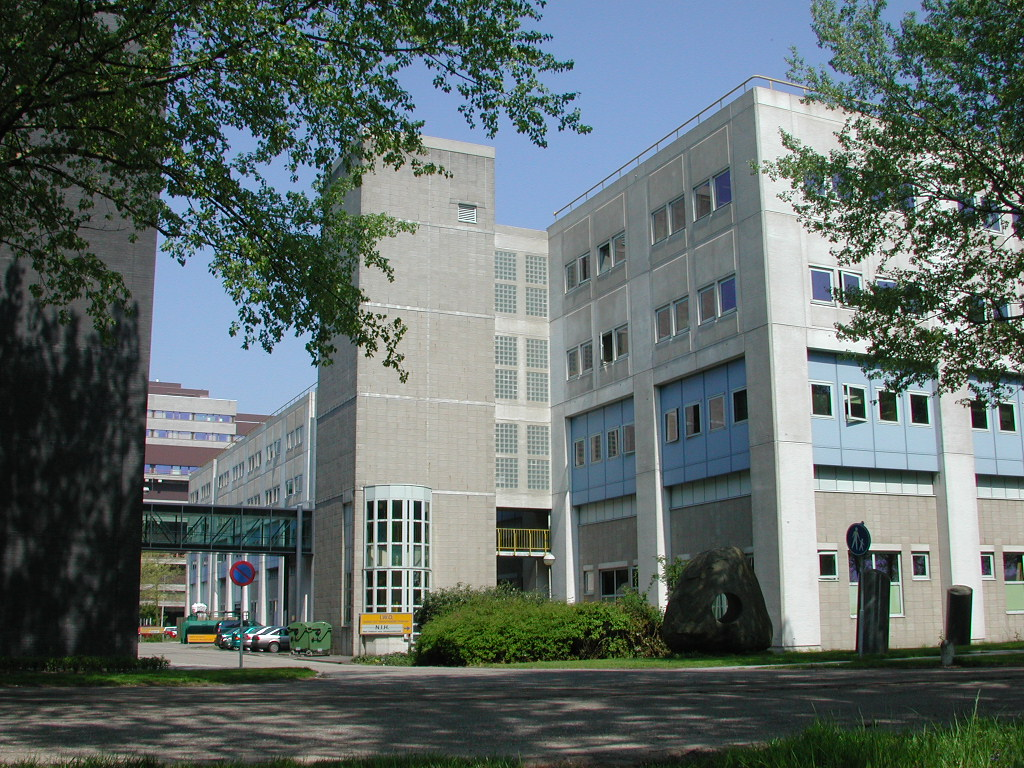
- Formation: 2005
- Type: Research Institute
- Purpose: Fundamental Neuroscience Research
- Headquarters: Amsterdam, Netherlands
- Location: Meibergdreef 47, 1105BA Amsterdam
- Official language: English and Dutch
- Director: Christiaan Levelt
- Parent organization: KNAW
- Staff: ~200
- Website: nin.nl

The Netherlands Institute for Neuroscience (NIN) (Dutch: Nederlands Herseninstituut) is a research institute of the Royal Netherlands Academy of Arts and Sciences (KNAW) that carries out neuroscience research with special emphasis on the brain and visual system. Although the institute's focus is on understanding the fundamental mechanisms underlying brain function, its research spans the development, plasticity and aging of the brain and is often linked to clinical research questions. In addition, the NIN includes the Netherlands Brain Bank and the Netherlands Sleep Registry.

== History ==
The Netherlands Institute for Neuroscience (NIN) came into being on 1 July 2005 as the merger of the Netherlands Institute for Brain Research (NIBR) and the Netherlands Ophthalmic Research Institute (NORI). The NIBR dates back to the beginning of the 20th century. A meeting of the International Association of Academies held in Paris in 1901 led in 1904 to the formation of the International Academic Committee for Brain Research, and the foundation of several institutes for brain research in Europe, including in 1908, the “Netherlands Central Institute for Brain Research”. Under director Prof C. U. Ariëns Kappers (director 1909–1946) and his successors the institute acquired an international reputation as a centre of excellent brain research. Originally oriented to comparative neuroanatomy the institute later became a multidisciplinary centre with outstanding research facilities

The NORI was founded in 1972 as an inter-university institute to perform basic research. The ophthalmogenetic database founded by Prof J.W. Delleman and the systematic functional analysis of the visual system initiated by Prof H. Spekreijse made the institute an internationally recognized centre in vision research. In the late nineties the research objective focused increasingly on the functioning of the visual system and its relation to the brain.

Since 2010 it has run an annual Art of Neuroscience competition. In 2020 seven entries were chosen by Scientific American as Editors’ Picks.

== Research ==
=== Groups and organization ===
The institute has 18 research groups who are housed in the NIN building. The employees of 15 groups are employed at the NIN, while the employees of another three groups are employed by the Amsterdam University Medical Center. Current employees include Christian Keysers and Valeria Gazzola.

=== Projects ===
In November 2020 the institute got funding from the Start2Cure Foundation for a project to investigate the potential of a gene therapy approach to treat multiple sclerosis and to identify the genes involved in the production of myelin and in repairing nerve fibers.

They are involved in research into artificial vision. In December 2020 they published results of their significant study implanting electrodes into macaque monkeys. Shapes of letters were directly transmitted into the brains of the monkeys and they were able to respond to them without actually seeing them.

=== Infrastructure ===
The institute host several two-photon excitation microscopy setups to perform in vivo brain imaging at the cellular and sub-cellular level, high density EEG labs, multi-electrode recording systems. The institute also hosts a large mechanical workshop, which provides technical support to its research staff and helps co-develop new research tools. Additionally, the NIN is a stakeholder in the Spinoza Centre for Neuroimaging, which hosts 3T and 7T MRI systems for human neuroscience.

== Grants and prizes ==
Many of the institute's scientists are recipients of prestigious grants, awards and distinctions, including European Research Council laureates, VIDI/VICI grant holders. Several of its principal investigators are members of national and international academies: Chris de Zeeuw is a member of the KNAW and Christian Keysers is a member of the Young Academy of Europe.
