= Mónica Morales Masís =

Costa Rican materials scientist

Mónica Morales Masís (born 1982) is a Costa Rican physicist and materials scientist who works in The Netherlands as a professor at the University of Twente. Her research focuses on optoelectronics, transparent electronics, and solar cells.

== Education and career ==
Morales is originally from Cartago, Costa Rica, where she was born in 1982. A childhood idol was Costa Rican astronaut Franklin Chang-Díaz. After a 2004 bachelor's degree in physics from the University of Costa Rica, she traveled to the US for a master's degree at Wright State University, in 2007, and then to The Netherlands for a doctorate at Leiden University, focusing on condensed-matter physics. Her 2012 doctoral thesis concerned the memristive properties of silver sulfide, and was promoted by Jan van Ruitenbeek; it also included work done at the National Institute for Materials Science in Japan with Tsuyoshi Hasegawa.

Next, she went to Switzerland for postdoctoral research at the École Polytechnique Fédérale de Lausanne (EPFL). Her interest in photovoltaics developed at that time, and she continued at EPFL as a research group leader in the subject. She took a tenure-track faculty position at the University of Twente in 2018, and became a full professor there. At Twente, she is affiliated with the faculty of science and technology, in the inorganic materials science group, and with the MESA+ Institute for Nanotechnology.

== Recognition ==
Morales joined the Young Academy of Europe in 2022.
