= Cecilia Heyes =

British psychologist (born 1960)

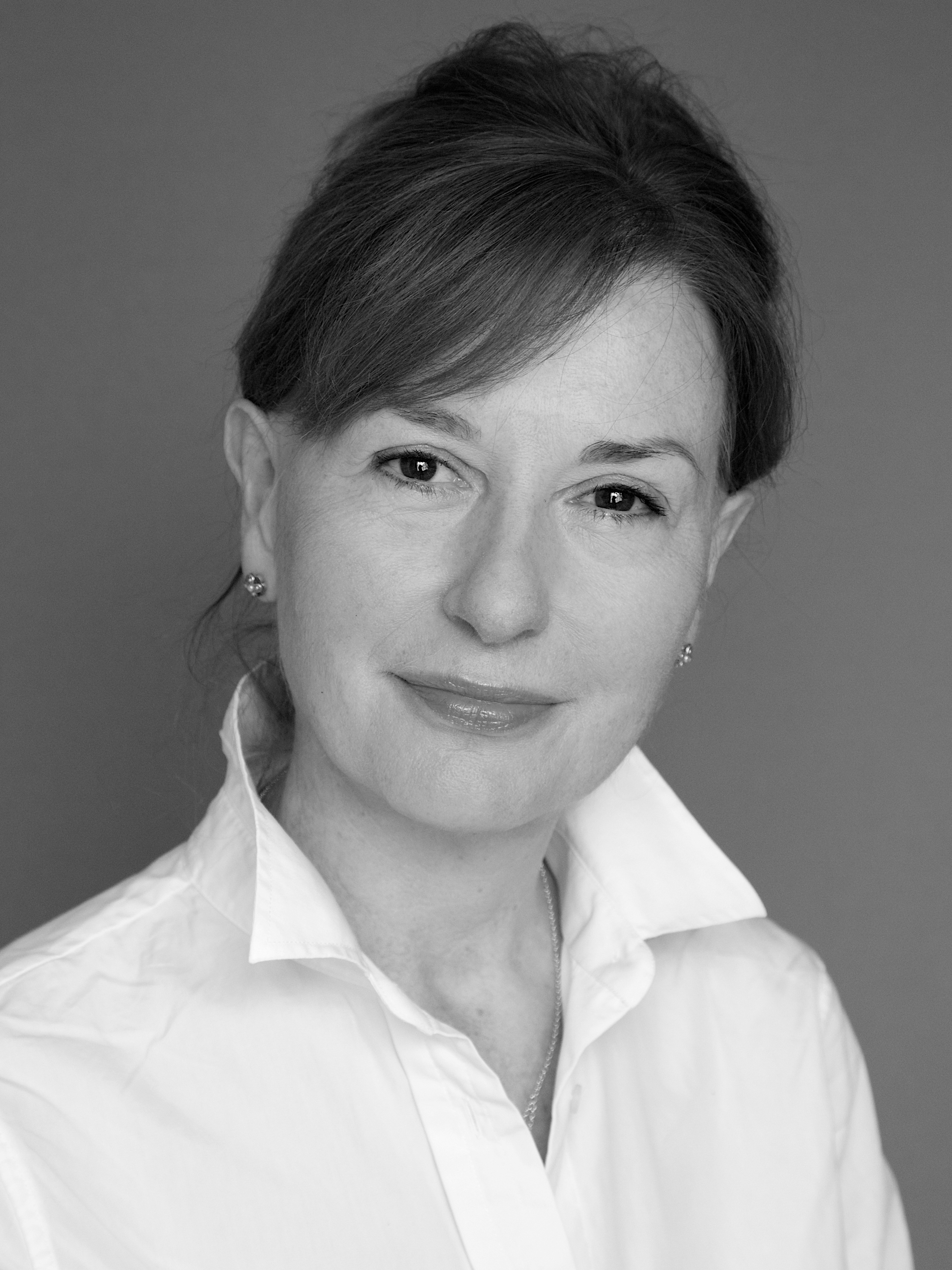
- Born: 6 March 1960 (age 66); Ashford, UK
- Education: University College London (BSc 1981, PhD 1984)
- Scientific career
- Fields: Psychology
- Workplaces: University of Oxford

Cecilia Heyes FBA (born 6 March 1960) is a British psychologist who studies the evolution of the human mind. She is a Senior Research Fellow in Theoretical Life Sciences at All Souls College, and a Professor of Psychology at the University of Oxford. She is also a Fellow of the British Academy (psychology and philosophy sections), and President of the Experimental Psychology Society.

Heyes is the author of Cognitive Gadgets: The Cultural Evolution of Thinking (2018), described by Tyler Cowen as "an important book and likely the most thoughtful of the year in the social sciences".

Heyes has argued that the picture presented by some evolutionary psychology of the human mind as a collection of cognitive instincts – organs of thought shaped by genetic evolution over very long time periods – does not fit research results. She posits instead that humans have cognitive gadgets – "special-purpose organs of thought" built in the course of development through social interaction. These are products of cultural rather than genetic evolution, and may develop and change much more quickly and flexibly than cognitive instincts.

In 2017, Heyes gave the Chandaria Lectures at the Institute of Philosophy, University of London. She has written for the Times Literary Supplement and given a number of radio and television interviews.

== Early life ==
Cecilia was the youngest of four children born to Helen Heyes (née Henneker) and James Heyes, who died in 1965. She credits her brother, Vincent Heyes, with having "taught his little sister how to argue, and how to enjoy doing it – in the right company – above nearly all things". She was the first member of her family to go to university.

== Education ==
After passing the eleven-plus exam, Heyes studied at Highworth Grammar School for Girls and then obtained a Bachelor of Science (1981) and PhD (1984) in psychology at University College London (UCL). In 2016 she was awarded a Doctor of Science, a higher doctorate, by the University of Oxford.

== Career ==
In her first postdoctoral research position (1984–1986), Heyes studied evolutionary epistemology, a blend of philosophy, evolutionary biology and cognitive science. Funded by a two-year Harkness Fellowship, she worked with Donald T. Campbell at Lehigh University, with William Wimsatt at the University of Chicago, and with Daniel Dennett at Tufts University.

Returning to the UK and to experimental psychology, from 1986 to 1989 Heyes was a Research Fellow of Trinity Hall, University of Cambridge. During this period she studied animal learning and cognition in the laboratory of Nicholas Mackintosh and Tony Dickinson.

In 1988, Heyes started a 20-year period back at UCL, first as a lecturer in psychology, and later as a Senior Lecturer (1993), Reader (1996), and Professor (2000). Throughout the period she headed a laboratory studying social cognition – social learning, imitation, mirror neurons, and self-recognition. This experimental work, funded by the Leverhulme Trust, BBSRC, EPSRC, and ESRC, initially focused on nonhuman animals – rodents and birds – and later used behavioural and neurophysiological methods to examine cognitive processes in adult humans.

In 2008, Heyes gave up her lab and moved to All Souls College, University of Oxford, where she is a Senior Research Fellow in Theoretical Life Sciences. She is also a full professor affiliated with the Department of Experimental Psychology.

Heyes has collaborated with economists as a Fellow of the ESRC Centre for Economic Learning and Social Evolution (1995–2010), founded by Ken Binmore, and since 2010 as a member of the Scientific Council of the Institute of Advanced Study in Toulouse, directed by Paul Seabright.

She was awarded the British Psychological Society's Cognitive Section Prize in 2004, Fellowship of the British Academy in 2010, and Fellowship of the Cognitive Science Society in 2018. Heyes was President of the Experimental Psychology Society from 2018 to 2019.

In 2017 Heyes gave the Chandaria Lectures at the Institute of Philosophy, University of London, and in 2020 she is scheduled to give the Rudolf Carnap Lectures at the Institute of Philosophy, Ruhr-Universität Bochum.

== Research ==
Heyes works on the evolution of cognition, examining how genetic evolution, cultural evolution and learning combine to produce the mature cognitive abilities found in adult humans.

Her theories are based on experimental research in animal, cognitive, developmental and social psychology, cognitive neuroscience, and behavioral economics. Although insistent that our understanding of the evolution of cognition must be data-driven, she also draws on theorizing in the philosophy of mind and the philosophy of biology.

Heyes advances simple explanations for animal and human behavior. For example, her associative sequence learning model of imitation and mirror neurons suggests they are based on associative learning. However, she is not a fan of parsimony. She argues that, when a simple and a complex explanation both fit current data, scientists need to devise new experiments to test the theories against one another. We can't assume that the simple explanation is more likely to be right.

In common with evolutionary psychologists such as Steven Pinker, Leda Cosmides and John Tooby, Heyes works within the computational view of the mind, and assumes that genetic evolution has played a major role in shaping the minds and behavior of all animals. In contrast with other evolutionary psychologists, she argues that cultural evolution has been the principal architect of the human mind. Distinctively human cognitive mechanisms – such as language, imitation, theory of mind, episodic memory, causal understanding, morality, and explicit metacognition – are constructed in childhood through social interaction. These "cognitive gadgets" are built from and by "old parts" – genetically inherited attentional, motivational, and learning processes that are present in a wide range of animals.

According to Heyes, "At birth, the minds of human babies are only subtly different from the minds of newborn chimpanzees. We are friendlier, our attention is drawn to different things, and we have a capacity to learn and remember that outstrips the abilities of newborn chimpanzees. Yet when these subtle differences are exposed to culture-soaked human environments, they have enormous effects. They enable us to upload distinctively human ways of thinking from the social world around us."

Heyes's "cultural evolutionary psychology" implies that the human mind is more fragile and more agile than previously assumed; more vulnerable to catastrophe, and better able to adapt to new technologies and ways of life. "In a skeletal, traumatized population, children would be unlikely to develop the Big Special cognitive mechanisms, such as causal understanding, episodic memory, imitation and mindreading. The capacity for cultural evolution, as well as the products of cultural evolution, would be lost." However "cultural evolutionary psychology ... suggests that distinctively human cognitive mechanisms are light on their feet, constantly changing to meet the demands of new social and physical environments. ... On the cognitive gadgets view, rather than taxing an outdated mind, new technologies – social media, robotics, virtual reality – merely provide the stimulus for further cultural evolution of the human mind."

Cultural evolutionary studies are rapidly expanding. Unlike other cultural evolutionists, Heyes argues that it is not just what we think, but how we think, that is shaped by cultural evolution. Both the grist and the mills of the mind are cultural products.

Like dual-inheritance theorists, Heyes assumes that Darwinian selection plays an important role in cultural evolution; that the products of cultural evolution are sometimes adaptive; and that genetic and cultural evolution often work together. However, she argues that cultural selection has been the dominant force in shaping distinctively human cognitive mechanisms. She acknowledges the possibility of genetic assimilation, but finds little evidence that cognitive gadgets have been genetically assimilated.

== Reception ==
Daniel Dennett says that people who study animal behavior fall into two camps, 'romantics' and 'killjoys'. Heyes is regarded by romantics as a killjoy. Frans de Waal, a long-standing critic, believes that Heyes takes simple explanations for animal behavior too seriously, and engages in "theoretical acrobatics".

Evolutionary anthropologists, Dan Sperber and Olivier Morin, portray Heyes as a "a forceful critic of the Evolutionary Psychology approach defended by Cosmides, Tooby, Pinker and others", and commend her predictive power: "Having defended empiricism when the odds were lowest, Cecilia Heyes reaps the rewards of a series of wise bets". However, they argue that she over-estimates the influence of cultural, rather than genetic, evolution in shaping human cognition, and, using literacy and numeracy as examples, that her book Cognitive Gadgets does not provide compelling evidence for cultural selection rather than cultural diffusion of distinctively human cognitive mechanisms.

Tyler Cowen, an economist, wrote of Cognitive Gadgets: "think of this book as perhaps the best attempt so far to explain the weirdness of humans, relative to other animals", and "Highly recommended, it is likely to prove one of the most thought-provoking books of the year."

Economist Diane Coyle described Cognitive Gadgets as a new and "persuasive approach to thinking about decision-making – not for example as a matter of setting up choices in ways that nudge flawed humans to do the right thing".

Reviewing Cognitive Gadgets in the arts journal Leonardo, Jan Baatens described the book as "an impressive and convincing intervention in the debate on what makes us human", and commends Heyes's style of thinking as "nuanced and cautious. The author does not make overgeneralizing claims, she is not looking for a new Grand Theory".

In 2019, a precis of Cognitive Gadgets was reviewed by 20–30 cognitive scientists, neuroscientists and philosophers in Behavioral and Brain Sciences.

== Curiosities ==
As Lord Mallard of All Souls College, Heyes is required to sing a medieval Mallard Song after two dinners each year. The dinners are attended only by fellows of the college.

Heyes chose the word 'gadgets' for culturally evolved cognitive mechanisms, in part, because she likes the sound of the word – almost as much as the word 'rapture'.

== Selected publications ==
=== Monograph ===
- Heyes, C. M. (2018). Cognitive Gadgets: The Cultural Evolution of Thinking. Harvard University Press.

=== Edited books and special issues ===
- Heyes, C. M. & Galef, B. G. Eds. (1996) Social Learning and the Roots of Culture. Academic Press. Pp. 411.
- Heyes, C. M. & Huber, L. Eds. (2001) The Evolution of Cognition. MIT Press. Pp. 400.
- Heyes, C. M. & Hull, D.Eds. (2001) Selection Theory and Social Construction: The Evolutionary Naturalistic Epistemology of Donald T. Campbell. SUNY Press. Pp. 200.
- Heyes, C. M.; Frith, U. (2012). "Theme issue on 'New Thinking: The Evolution of Human Cognition'". Philosophical Transactions of the Royal Society of London. Series B, Biological Sciences. 367 (1599): 2091–6. doi:10.1098/rstb.2012.0111. PMC 3385676. PMID 22734052.

=== Articles ===
- Heyes, C. M.; Durlach, P. J. (1990). "Social blockade of taste-aversion learning in rats: is it a social phenomenon?". Journal of Comparative Psychology. 104 (1): 82–87. doi:10.1037/0735-7036.104.1.82. PMID 2354630.
- Heyes, C. M.; Dawson, G. R. (1990). "A demonstration of observational learning using a bidirectional control". Quarterly Journal of Experimental Psychology. 42B: 59–71.
- Heyes, C. M.; Dickinson, A. (1990). "The intentionality of animal action". Mind and Language. 5: 87–104. doi:10.1111/j.1468-0017.1990.tb00154.x.
- Heyes, C. M. (1993). "Imitation, culture and cognition". Animal Behaviour. 46 (5): 999–1010. doi:10.1006/anbe.1993.1281. S2CID 53164177.
- Heyes, C. M. (1994). "Reflections on self-recognition in primates". Animal Behaviour. 47 (4): 909–919. doi:10.1006/anbe.1994.1123. S2CID 53256888.
- Heyes, C. M. (1994). "Social learning in animals: Categories and mechanisms". Biological Reviews. 69 (2): 207–231. doi:10.1111/j.1469-185x.1994.tb01506.x. PMID 8054445. S2CID 36668363.
- Chater, N.; Heyes, C. M. (1994). "Animal concepts: content and discontent". Mind and Language. 9 (3): 209–246. doi:10.1111/j.1468-0017.1994.tb00224.x.
- Mitchell, C.; Heyes, C. M. (1996). "Simultaneous potentiation and overshadowing in conditioned food aversion". Learning and Motivation. 27: 58–72. doi:10.1006/lmot.1996.0004. S2CID 44048219.
- Heyes, C. M. (1998). "Theory of mind in nonhuman primates" (PDF). Behavioral and Brain Sciences. 21 (1): 101–114. doi:10.1017/s0140525x98000703. PMID 10097012. S2CID 6469633.
- Mitchell, C. J.; Heyes, C. M.; Dawson, G. R.; Gardner, M. R. (1999). "Limitations of a bidirectional control procedure for the investigation of imitation in rats: odour cues on the manipulandum". Quarterly Journal of Experimental Psychology B. 52: 193–202.
- Heyes, C. M.; Ray, E. (2000). "What is the significance of imitation in animals?". Advances in the Study of Behavior. 29: 215–245. doi:10.1016/S0065-3454(08)60106-0. ISBN 978-0-12-004529-7.
- Heyes, C. M. (2001). "Causes and consequences of imitation". Trends in Cognitive Sciences. 5 (6): 253–261. doi:10.1016/s1364-6613(00)01661-2. PMID 11390296. S2CID 15602731.
- Huang, C-T; Heyes, C. M.; Charman, T. (2002). "Infants' behavioral re-enactment of 'failed attempts': Exploring the roles of emulation learning, stimulus enhancement and understanding of intentions". Developmental Psychology. 38 (5): 840–855. doi:10.1037/0012-1649.38.5.840. PMID 12220059.
- Heyes, C. M. (2003). "Four routes of cognitive evolution". Psychological Review. 110 (4): 713–727. doi:10.1037/0033-295x.110.4.713. PMID 14599239. S2CID 15984703.
- Bird, G.; Heyes, C. M. (2005). "Effector-dependent learning by observation of a finger movement sequence". Journal of Experimental Psychology: Human Perception and Performance. 31 (2): 262–275. doi:10.1037/0096-1523.31.2.262. PMID 15826229. S2CID 11601317.
- Brass, M.; Heyes, C. M. (2005). "Imitation: Is cognitive neuroscience solving the correspondence problem". Trends in Cognitive Sciences. 9 (10): 489–495. doi:10.1016/j.tics.2005.08.007. PMID 16126449. S2CID 1594505.
- Heyes, C. M.; Bird, G.; Johnson, H.; Haggard, P. (2005). "Experience modulates automatic imitation". Cognitive Brain Research. 22 (2): 233–240. doi:10.1016/j.cogbrainres.2004.09.009. PMID 15653296.
- Press, C.; Bird, G.; Flach, R.; Heyes, C. M. (2005). "Robotic movement elicits automatic imitation". Cognitive Brain Research. 25 (3): 632–640. doi:10.1016/j.cogbrainres.2005.08.020. PMID 16344220.
- McGregor, A.; Saggerson, A.; Pearce, J.; Heyes, C. M. (2006). "Blind imitation in pigeons". Animal Behaviour. 72: 287–296. doi:10.1016/j.anbehav.2005.10.026. S2CID 140210114.
- Bird, G.; Brindley, R.; Leighton, J.; Heyes, C. M. (2007). "General processes, rather than 'goals,' explain imitation errors". Journal of Experimental Psychology: Human Perception and Performance. 33 (5): 1158–1169. doi:10.1037/0096-1523.33.5.1158. PMID 17924814. S2CID 16787353.
- Catmur, C.; Walsh, V.; Heyes, C. M. (2007). "Sensorimotor learning configures the human mirror system" (PDF). Current Biology. 17 (17): 1527–1531. doi:10.1016/j.cub.2007.08.006. PMID 17716898. S2CID 9489875.
- Press, C.; Gillmeister, H.; Heyes, C. M. (2007). "Sensorimotor experience enhances automatic imitation of robotic actions". Proceedings of the Royal Society B: Biological Sciences. 274 (1625): 2509–2514. doi:10.1098/rspb.2007.0774. PMC 2275887. PMID 17698489.
- Catmur, C.; Gillmeister, H.; Bird, G.; Liepelt, R.; Brass, M.; Heyes, C. (2008). "Through the looking glass: counter-mirror activation following incompatible sensorimotor learning. Featured article" (PDF). European Journal of Neuroscience. 28 (6): 1208–1215. doi:10.1111/j.1460-9568.2008.06419.x. PMID 18783371. S2CID 2735794.
- Leighton, J.; Bird, G.; Charman, T.; Heyes, C. M. (2008). "Weak imitative performance is not due to a functional mirroring impairment in adults with autism spectrum disorders". Neuropsychologia. 46 (4): 1041–1049. doi:10.1016/j.neuropsychologia.2007.11.013. PMID 18177677. S2CID 16936264.
- Catmur, C.; Walsh, V.; Heyes, C. M. (2009). "The role of experience in the development of imitation and the mirror system". Philosophical Transactions of the Royal Society B. 364 (1528): 2369–2380. doi:10.1098/rstb.2009.0048. PMC 2865072. PMID 19620108.
- Heyes, C. M. (2009). "Evolution, development and intentional control of imitation". Philosophical Transactions of the Royal Society B. 364 (1528): 2293–2298. doi:10.1098/rstb.2009.0049. PMC 2865081. PMID 19620101.
- Cook, R.; Press, C.; Dickinson, A.; Heyes, C. M. (2010). "Is the acquisition of automatic imitation sensitive to sensorimotor contingency?" (PDF). Journal of Experimental Psychology: Human Perception and Performance. 36 (4): 840–852. doi:10.1037/a0019256. PMID 20695703.
- Heyes, C. M. (2010). "Where do mirror neurons come from?". Neuroscience and Biobehavioral Reviews. 34 (4): 575–583. doi:10.1016/j.neubiorev.2009.11.007. PMID 19914284. S2CID 2578537.
- Heyes, C. M. (2010). "Mesmerising mirror neurons". NeuroImage. 51 (2): 789–791. doi:10.1016/j.neuroimage.2010.02.034. PMID 20167276. S2CID 42331993.
- Leighton, J.; Bird, G.; Heyes, C. M. (2010). "'Goals' are not an integral component of imitation". Cognition. 114 (3): 423–435. doi:10.1016/j.cognition.2009.11.001. PMID 19945096. S2CID 18044218.
- Leighton, J.; Bird, G.; Orsini, C.; Heyes, C. M. (2010). "Social attitudes modulate automatic imitation" (PDF). Journal of Experimental Social Psychology. 46 (6): 905–910. doi:10.1016/j.jesp.2010.07.001.
- Leighton, J.; Heyes, C. M. (2010). "Hand to mouth: Automatic imitation across effector systems". Journal of Experimental Psychology: Human Perception and Performance. 36 (5): 1174–1183. doi:10.1037/a0019953. PMID 20731510.
- Shea, N.; Heyes, C. M. (2010). "Metamemory as evidence of animal consciousness: The type that does the trick". Biology & Philosophy. 25 (1): 95–110. doi:10.1007/s10539-009-9171-0. PMC 2837231. PMID 20234826.
- Catmur, C.; Heyes, C. M. (2011). "Time course analyses confirm the independence of imitative and spatial compatibility" (PDF). Journal of Experimental Psychology: Human Perception and Performance. 37 (2): 409–421. doi:10.1037/a0019325. PMID 20731523.
- Catmur, C.; Mars, R; Rushworth, M.; Heyes, C. M. (2011). "Making mirrors: premotor cortex stimulation enhances mirror and counter-mirror motor facilitation" (PDF). Journal of Cognitive Neuroscience. 23 (9): 2352–2362. doi:10.1162/jocn.2010.21590. PMID 20946056. S2CID 318188.
- Heyes, C. M. (2011). "Automatic imitation". Psychological Bulletin. 137 (3): 463–483. doi:10.1037/a0022288. PMID 21280938. S2CID 6975248.
- Ray, E. D.; Heyes, C. M. (2011). "Imitation in infancy: The wealth of the stimulus". Developmental Science. 14 (1): 92–105. doi:10.1111/j.1467-7687.2010.00961.x. PMID 21159091.
- Cook, R.; Bird, G.; Lunser, G.; Huck, S.; Heyes, C. M. (2012). "Automatic imitation in a strategic context: Players of Rock-Paper-Scissors imitate opponents' gestures". Proceedings of the Royal Society B: Biological Sciences. 279 (1729): 780–786. doi:10.1098/rspb.2011.1024. PMC 3248720. PMID 21775334.
- Cook, R.; Dickinson, A.; Heyes, C. M. (2012). "Contextual modulation of mirror and counter-mirror sensorimotor associations" (PDF). Journal of Experimental Psychology: General. 141 (4): 774–787. doi:10.1037/a0027561. PMID 22428612.
- Cook, R.; Johnson, A.; Heyes, C. M. (2012). "Self-recognition of avatar motion: How do I know it's me?". Proceedings of the Royal Society B: Biological Sciences. 279 (1729): 669–674. doi:10.1098/rspb.2011.1264. PMC 3248734. PMID 21795274.
- Heyes, C. M. (2012). "What's social about social learning?". Journal of Comparative Psychology. 126 (2): 193–202. doi:10.1037/a0025180. PMID 21895355. S2CID 12849381.
- Heyes, C. M. (2012). "New thinking about the evolution of human cognition". Philosophical Transactions of the Royal Society B. 367 (1599): 2091–2096. doi:10.1098/rstb.2012.0111. PMC 3385676. PMID 22734052.
- Heyes, C. M. (2012). "Grist and mills: cultural inheritance of cultural learning". Philosophical Transactions of the Royal Society B. 367 (1599): 2181–2191. doi:10.1098/rstb.2012.0120. PMC 3385685. PMID 22734061.
- Heyes, C. M. (2012). "Simple minds: A qualified defence of associative learning". Philosophical Transactions of the Royal Society B. 367 (1603): 2695–2703. doi:10.1098/rstb.2012.0217. PMC 3427553. PMID 22927568.
- Press, C.; Catmur, C.; Cook, R.; Widman, H.; Heyes, C. M.; Bird, G. (2012). "fMRI evidence of 'mirror' responses to geometric shapes". PLOS ONE. 7 (12) e51934. Bibcode:2012PLoSO...751934P. doi:10.1371/journal.pone.0051934. PMC 3522615. PMID 23251653.
- Belot, M.; Crawford, V. P.; Heyes, C. M. (2013). "Players of 'matching pennies' automatically imitate opponents' gestures against strong incentives". Proceedings of the National Academy of Sciences. 110 (8): 2763–2768. Bibcode:2013PNAS..110.2763B. doi:10.1073/pnas.1209981110. PMC 3581976. PMID 23382227.
- Catmur, C.; Heyes, C. M. (2013). "Is it what you do, or when you do it? The roles of contingency and similarity in pro-social effects of imitation" (PDF). Cognitive Science. 37 (8): 1541–1552. doi:10.1111/cogs.12071. PMID 23915222.
- Cook, R.; Johnston, A.; Heyes, C. M. (2013). "Facial self-imitation: objective measurement reveals no improvement without visual feedback". Psychological Science. 24 (1): 93–98. doi:10.1177/0956797612452568. PMID 23196637. S2CID 17763543.
- Cook, J.; den Ouden, H.E.M; Heyes, C. M.; Cools, R. (2014). "The social dominance paradox". Current Biology. 24 (23): 2812–2816. doi:10.1016/j.cub.2014.10.014. hdl:2066/137077. PMID 25454588.
- Cook, R.; Bird, G.; Catmur, C.; Press, C.; Heyes, C. M. (2014). "Mirror neurons: from origin to function" (PDF). Behavioral and Brain Sciences. 37 (2): 177–241. doi:10.1017/s0140525x13000903. PMID 24775147. S2CID 52873194.
- Heyes, C. M. (2014). "False belief in infancy: a fresh look". Developmental Science. 17 (5): 647–659. doi:10.1111/desc.12148. PMID 24666559.
- Heyes, C. M. (2014). "Submentalizing: I am not really reading your mind". Perspectives on Psychological Science. 9 (2): 131–143. doi:10.1177/1745691613518076. PMID 26173251. S2CID 206778161.
- Heyes, C. M.; Frith, C. D. (2014). "The cultural evolution of mind reading". Science. 344 (6190) 1243091. doi:10.1126/science.1243091. PMID 24948740. S2CID 3139981.
- Shea, N.; Boldt, A.; Bang, D.; Yeung, N.; Heyes, C. M.; Frith, C. D. (2014). "Supra-personal cognitive control and metacognition". Trends in Cognitive Sciences. 18 (4): 186–193. doi:10.1016/j.tics.2014.01.006. PMC 3989995. PMID 24582436.
- de Klerk, C. C. J. M.; Johnson, M. H.; Heyes, C. M.; Southgate, V. (2015). "Baby steps: investigating the development of perceptual-motor couplings in infancy". Developmental Science. 18 (2): 270–280. doi:10.1111/desc.12226. PMC 4441281. PMID 25123212.
- Heyes, C. M. (2015). "Animal mindreading: What's the problem?". Psychonomic Bulletin & Review. 22 (2): 313–327. doi:10.3758/s13423-014-0704-4. PMID 25102928. S2CID 37581900.
- Heyes, C. M.; Pearce, J. M. (2015). "Not-so-social learning strategies". Proceedings of the Royal Society B: Biological Sciences. 282 (1802) 20141709. doi:10.1098/rspb.2014.1709. PMC 4344138. PMID 25608880.
- Catmur, C.; Santiesteban, I.; Conway, J. R.; Heyes, C. M.; Bird, G. (2016). "Avatars and arrows in the brain". NeuroImage. 132: 8–10. doi:10.1016/j.neuroimage.2016.02.021. PMID 26883064. S2CID 8153899.
- Heyes, C. M. (2016). "Born pupils? Natural pedagogy and cultural pedagogy". Perspectives on Psychological Science. 11 (2): 280–295. doi:10.1177/1745691615621276. PMID 26993279. S2CID 31983269.
- Heyes, C. M. (2016). "Blackboxing: social learning strategies and cultural evolution". Philosophical Transactions of the Royal Society B: Biological Sciences. 371 (1693) 20150369. doi:10.1098/rstb.2015.0369. PMC 4843607. PMID 27069046.
- Heyes, C. M. (2016). "Imitation – not in our genes". Current Biology. 26 (10): R405–431. doi:10.1016/j.cub.2016.03.060. PMID 27218847.
- Heyes, C. M. (2016). "Who knows? Metacognitive social learning strategies". Trends in Cognitive Sciences. 20 (3): 204–213. doi:10.1016/j.tics.2015.12.007. PMID 26778808. S2CID 3621104.
- Heyes, C. M. (2017). "When does social learning become cultural learning?". Developmental Science. 20 (2) e12350. doi:10.1111/desc.12350. PMID 26547886.
- Heyes, C. M. (2017). "Apes submentalise". Trends in Cognitive Sciences. 21 (1): 1–2. doi:10.1016/j.tics.2016.11.006. PMID 27919697. S2CID 3621423.
- Heyes, C. M. (2018). "Enquire within: cultural evolution and cognitive science". Philosophical Transactions of the Royal Society B: Biological Sciences. 373 (1743) 20170051. doi:10.1098/rstb.2017.0051. PMC 5812964. PMID 29440517.
- Heyes, C. M. (2018). "Empathy is not in our genes". Neuroscience and Biobehavioral Reviews. 95: 499–507. doi:10.1016/j.neubiorev.2018.11.001. PMID 30399356. S2CID 53233440.
