= Associative sequence learning =

Theory of learning

Associative sequence learning (ASL) is a neuroscientific theory that attempts to explain how mirror neurons are able to match observed and performed actions, and how individuals (adults, children, animals) are able to imitate body movements. The theory was proposed by Cecilia Heyes in 2000. (For reviews see). A conceptually similar model proposed by Christian Keysers and David Perrett, based on what we know about the neural properties of mirror neurons and spike-timing-dependent plasticity is the Hebbian learning account of mirror neurons.

Its central principle is that associations between sensory and motor representations are acquired ontogenetically (i.e. acquired during development), as a result of correlated sensorimotor experience. Consider the example of an actor clenching their fist. In this situation the activation of the motor representation (the motor plan to clench fist) is often paired with the corresponding perceptual representation (the sight of a closed fist). Heyes proposes that, over time, a bidirectional associative link is formed such that activation of one representation excites the other. Put simply, as a consequence of paired 'doing' and 'seeing' links are established which allow action observation to prime action execution.

In the above example, correlated sensorimotor experience is provided by self-observation. However, this cannot explain the development of sensorimotor associations for so-called 'perceptually opaque' actions. These are actions which cannot be observed by the actor, and include facial expressions, and whole body actions (e.g. a tennis serve). Heyes proposes two other sources of sensorimotor experience to account for the emergence of associations for opaque actions; experience mediated by mirror reflections, and the experience of being imitated by others. When an actor smiles in the mirror, his reflection smiles back. Consequently, a motor representation ("smile") is paired with the corresponding sensory representation (the sight of a smiling face). Similarly, there is considerable evidence that parents imitate young infants. Thus when an infant 'stumbles across' the motor plan to frown, this may be paired with the sight of a parent's frowning face.

Other sources of correlated sensorimotor experience may also include synchronous action (in dance and sports contexts where actors are executing and observing similar actions) and acquired equivalence experience (where an action excites a visual representation, via a shared auditory representation).

A further defining characteristic of the ASL model is its claim that the development of sensorimotor links is mediated by the same mechanisms of associative learning that produce Pavlovian conditioning. Crucially, Heyes therefore proposes that the development of sensorimotor associations is not only sensitive to temporal contiguity (the extent to which activation of sensory and motor representations are close together in time) but also to contingency (the extent to which activation of one representation is predictive of the other). This is a crucial feature of the ASL model as it explains why actors do not acquire spurious sensorimotor associations. Consider the example of two interactants, one of whom is scratching his ear when his colleague sneezes. Learning-based models which do not stipulate a sensitivity to contingency predict that the motor plan for ear-scratching ought to become associated with the visual representation of sneezing! However, ASL predicts that no association will develop because the act of ear-scratching is not predictive of the sight of sneezing – in other words there is no sensorimotor contingency. The Hebbian learning account of the emergence of mirror neurons also emphasizes the importance of contingency, as it is known that the synaptic plasticity that underlies Hebbian learning is known to depend on contingency.

== Evidence ==
Neuroimaging studies suggest that the human mirror system is sensitive to sensorimotor experience. Specifically, it appears that mirror system activation is greater when an observer has related motor expertise. For example, a stronger fMRI response was observed in classic mirror areas (premotor, parietal and posterior superior temporal sulcus) when ballet experts observed ballet sequences, than when they viewed matched capoeira stimuli. The fact that mirror system activation is sensitive to sensorimotor expertise, provides a strong indication that the properties of mirror neurons are acquired through learning.

Heyes and colleagues have also shown that a number of imitative effects, thought to be mediated by the mirror system, may be reversed through periods of 'counter-mirror' sensorimotor training. For example, humans are typically quicker at making imitative responses relative to comparable non-imitative responses. This effect is widely believed to be a product of the human mirror system: Action observation is thought to excite a subset of the premotor neurons responsible for the execution of an action, thus priming execution of the matching response. However, following periods of training during which the execution of one action (e.g. hand open) is paired with the observation of another action (e.g. hand close) the reaction time advantage for imitative responses may be abolished. Similar counter-mirror training has also been shown to reverse classic mirror system effects observed with transcranial magnetic stimulation (TMS) and functional imaging paradigms.

As predicted by associative learning theory, and therefore by the ASL model, this learning is sensitive to sensorimotor contingency (i.e. the degree to which excitation of one representation predicts the excitation of the other). When there is no contingency between sensory and motor representations; for example, when action execution is equally likely both in the presence and absence of the counter-mirror visual stimulus, little or no learning is observed.

== See also ==
- Mirror neuron
