= Thomas Webb (artist, born 1991) =

English artist (born 1991)

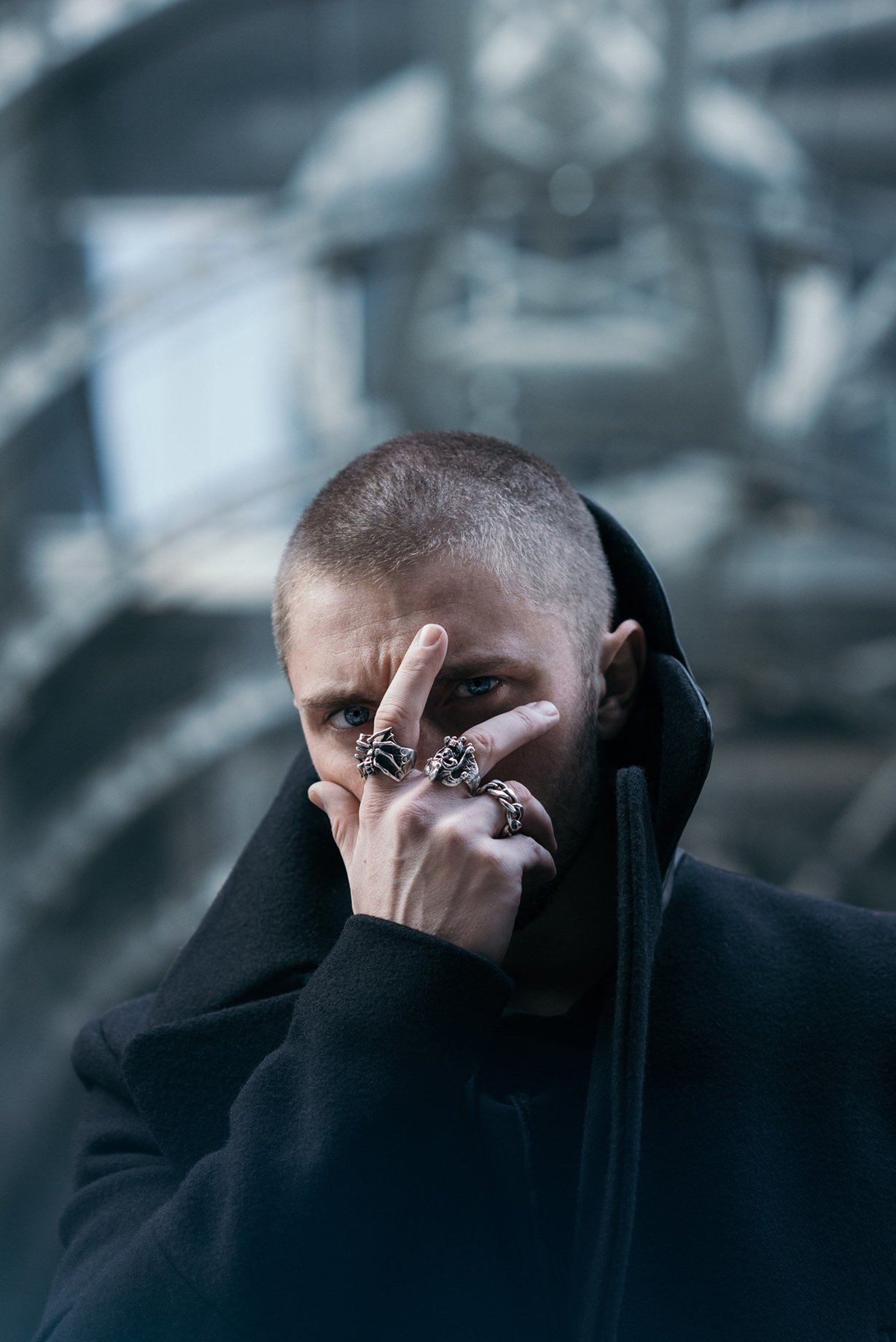
- Official Press Shot
- Born: Thomas Webb; 11 December 1991 (age 34); Ashford, Kent, UK
- Occupations: Artist, creative hacker
- Website: http://webb.site

Thomas Webb (born 11 December 1991) is a British contemporary artist, hacker, video game developer, TEDx speaker and magician. The theme of his work explores how society interacts with technology and the effect of social media and AI on mental health. His artwork is programmed into electronic installations using real-time data sources, AI and computer algorithms.

== Early life ==
Webb grew up in Ashford, Kent, United Kingdom. As a child, he attended Friars School which later became Ashford School. At age 11, Webb started Karate at his local JKA dojo. In December 2006 he passed his black belt grading in Walton on Thames aged 15. A few weeks later he was selected to represent his country in the JKAE Karate squad. He was selected to represent England in the French International Championships which took place early in December 2007 in Le Touquet in France. Tom received a gold medal in the U.18's kumite category. Webb also competed in Slovenia for the European karate championships where he placed in the final 5 earning him sponsorship from Adidas. He then attended St Edmund's School in Canterbury. Whilst there he hacked the school's computer network. He later attended Norton Knatchbull School in Ashford before attending Highworth Grammar School 6th Form where he was House Captain. He founded internet radio station filth.fm, which in 2011 was voted best radio station at the DMA's. At 18 Webb was billed as a warm up act alongside Hadouken!, Caspa and Chip and in 2010 he was the warm up act/DJ for Chase and Status.

== Worldwide Webb ==
Webb is the founder of the metaverse and MMORPG Worldwide Webb, which is built on the Ethereum blockchain. The release of the digital world occurred in November 2021, following a primitive version of the game being released in 2020 at the KÖNIG GALERIE in Berlin as a solo show entitled "An Exercise in Hopeless Nostalgia: Worldwide Webb". Art & Culture outlet MuserMeku said that "while Thomas Webb's works in the digital König gallery refer to the grievances of our world and society, which are dominated by technology corporations, the game itself shows how it could be if data is not used for profit but for the benefit of the user." The exhibited version of the game featured in a collection curated by Hans Ulrich Obrist and was later nominated for a Webby Award, while the full version of the game has risen to be the 6th largest metaverse by land sales as of May 2022. According to Venture Capital fund Andreessen Horowitz, secondary sales of land in Worldwide Webb have totalled $42 million. Notable owners of Worldwide Webb land include digital artist Pak, who holds the record for the most expensive NFT sale, and musician Mike Shinoda.

== America's Got Talent and magic career ==
At the age of 16 Webb became interested in close-up magic. Etienne Pradier heard of his performances and invited him to learn advanced close up magic. Webb's audition was broadcast in Episode 1204 under the stage name Tom London. His Judge Cuts performance was in Episode 1207. Webb's performance was not selected for the Quarterfinals. In an interview with Metro, he said that he had thought about doing Britain's Got Talent for a long time but decided to audition for America's Got Talent as he thought the show would help him more with his dream of performing in Las Vegas. In 2017 Webb delivered a keynote for WIRED magazine on combining technology and magic as an art form to explain the possibilities of VR, drones and robotics. He programmed an Amazon Echo to perform mind reading tricks and built drones that could perform the three card monte card trick. When asked about his inspirations for creating magic with technology Webb refers to Marco Tempest and French magician Jean Eugène Robert-Houdin.

== Keynote speaking ==
In 2018 he delivered a TEDxBerlin talk on creative hacking and a TEDxBucharest talk on hacking the internet to create real-time art.

== Art career ==
In July 2018 Webb held his debut art exhibition 'STRANGERS' at Woodbury House gallery in Soho. The exhibition was attended by Professor Green, Jamal Edwards and Reggie Yates. Webb's work focuses on using endlessly looping video game programs that use real-time data and algorithms to express his views. He pulls data from various internet sources such as social media and NASA's api's. To create his video-game like computer simulations, Webb created a digital infinity mirror. In 2019 Webb created an installation for Valentino during Art Basel in Switzerland. Webb was awarded the new media prize at the 2019 Ashurst emerging artist of the year competition for his piece "depressed twitter". The creation of the piece was described by The Face magazine as "looking at making us feel less alone".

== Directing ==
In March 2019 Webb wrote and directed a fashion film for Valentino and Mytheresa. The film was a part of a series of installations and artworks created for the collaboration. He was named as one of Saatchi & Saatchi's 2019 class of New Creators during a showcase at Cannes Lions festival for his short film "STRANGERS". The film features a real-time art piece typewriting tweets about depression.
