= Luciano Fadiga =

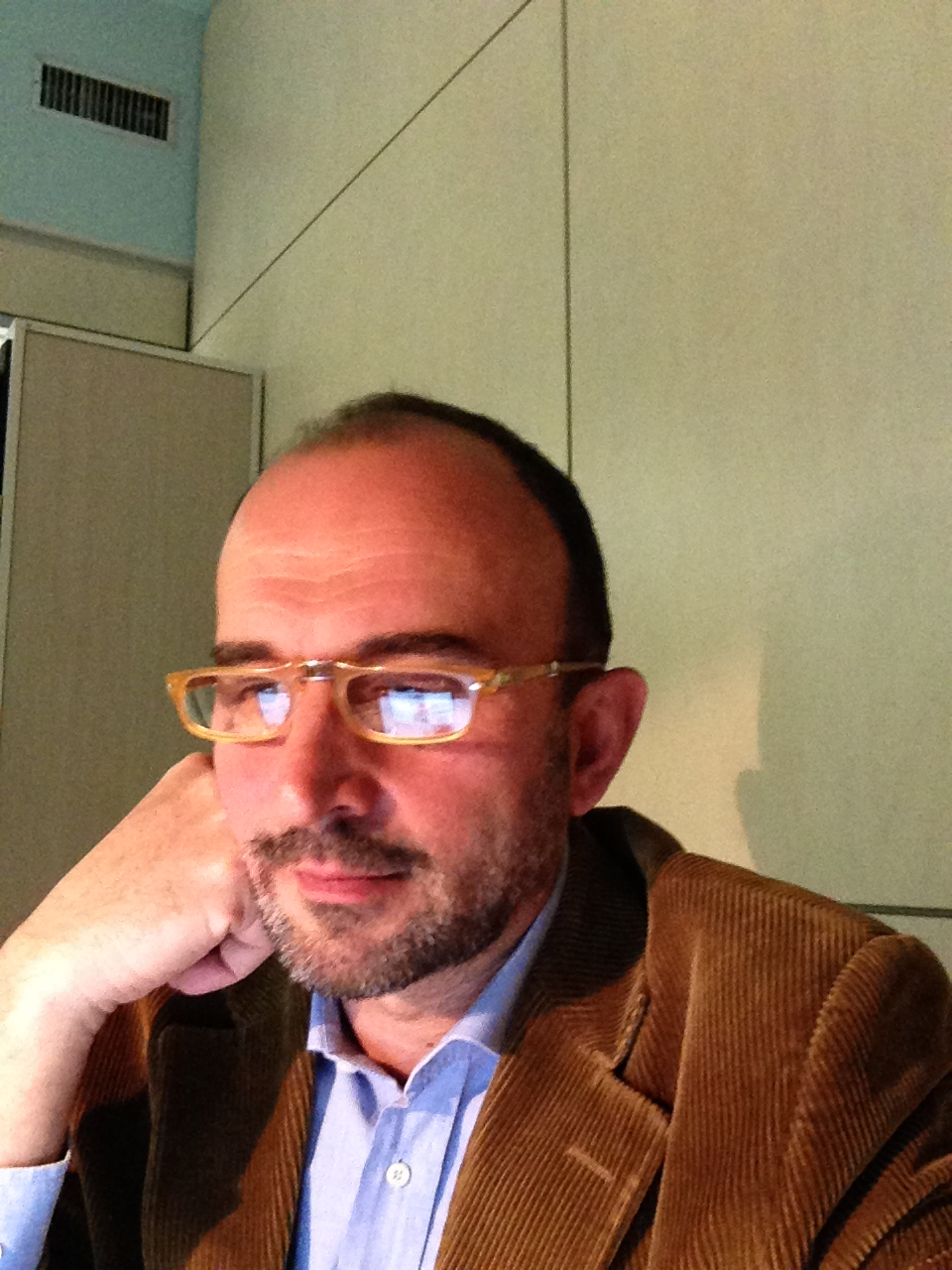
Luciano Fadiga

Luciano Fadiga (born 8 August 1961) is a neurophysiologist at the Human Physiology Section of the University of Ferrara and a Senior Researcher at the Istituto Italiano di Tecnologia of Genoa, Italy.

Born in 1961. M.D., University of Bologna, Ph.D. in Neuroscience, University of Parma. Senior Researcher at the University of Parma since 1992. He is actually Professor of Human Physiology at the University of Ferrara and Senior Researcher at the Italian Institute of Technology (IIT). He is the director of the IIT Center for Traslational Neurophysiology. He has a long experience in electrophysiology and neurophysiology in monkeys (single-neuron recordings) and humans (transcranial magnetic stimulation, study of spinal excitability, brain imaging, recording of single neurons in awake neurosurgery patients).

Among his contributions:

1. The description of the functional properties of the monkey ventral premotor cortex. During this time Fadiga, together with his Parma colleagues, discovered mirror neurons, a class of neurons that respond both when the monkey performs actions and when it observes similar actions made by other individuals. Fadiga has suggested that these neurons unify perception and action and may contribute to others’ action understanding (Experimental Brain Research, 1992; Brain, 1996; Cognitive Brain Research, 1996).
2. The first demonstration that a mirror system exists also in humans. He achieved this result by applying transcranial magnetic stimulation (TMS) on the hand motor cortex of human subjects while they were observing others' actions. He demonstrated that the amplitude of observer’s hand muscle potentials, as evoked by TMS, was specifically and significantly modulated by the observed actions (Journal of Neurophysiology 1995).
3. The study of peripersonal space representation in monkey premotor cortex (Science, 1997).
4. The demonstration that a similar motor resonance is activated during speech listening and involves tongue-related motor centers (European Journal of Neuroscience, 2002). He recently further demonstrates that this motor activation evoked by speech listening is functional to speech perception. This result shows for the first time a causal relationship between action representation and perception (The motor somatotopy of speech perception, Current Biology, 2009).
5. The first demonstration that, in humans, the frontal area for speech production (Broca’s area) is almost constantly activated by action observation (by several brain imaging experiments carried out in collaboration with San Raffaele Hospital of Milan, USC and UCLA of Los Angeles, HUT of Helsinki, Juelich Brain Imaging Center, Royal Holloway University of London) (Experimental Brain Research 1996).
6. The very recent demonstration that Broca’s area activation reflects a primary role played by this area in pragmatically understanding actions of others (Brain, 2009).

Fadiga is currently leading a group of researchers at the University of Ferrara. He is coordinating a project on neuro-rehabilitation of stroke patients by action observation. He is leading a group of researchers at the Italian Institute of Technology to investigate the possibility to establish hardware communication between the human brain and some artificial device (brain-machine interfaces). Other fields of his research concern attention and its neural mechanisms in normal subjects and patients. He has been involved in RobotCub, CONTACT, Siempre and Poeticon EU projects, he is currently working in EnTimeMent and Cobra EU Projects. He is interacting with roboticists in order to perform experiments on artefacts that would never be possible in living subjects. Within EU-IST, he is a strong supporter of the emerging cultural domain which is neurorobotics.

Fadiga is reviewer of many international neuroscience journals, he was principal investigator in CNR projects on reaching-grasping, he directs several European Projects on action and speech recognition and control, he was co-investigator in Human Frontier Science Program and McDonnel-Pew funded projects, he has published more than 200 peer-reviewed publications in international journals. His work has received about 50,000 citations (H-Index, 77. Source: Google Scholar). Luciano Fadiga has been member and Chair of the SH4 Panel (Starting and Consolidator Grants) of the European Research Council (ERC).
