= Highworth Grammar School for Girls =

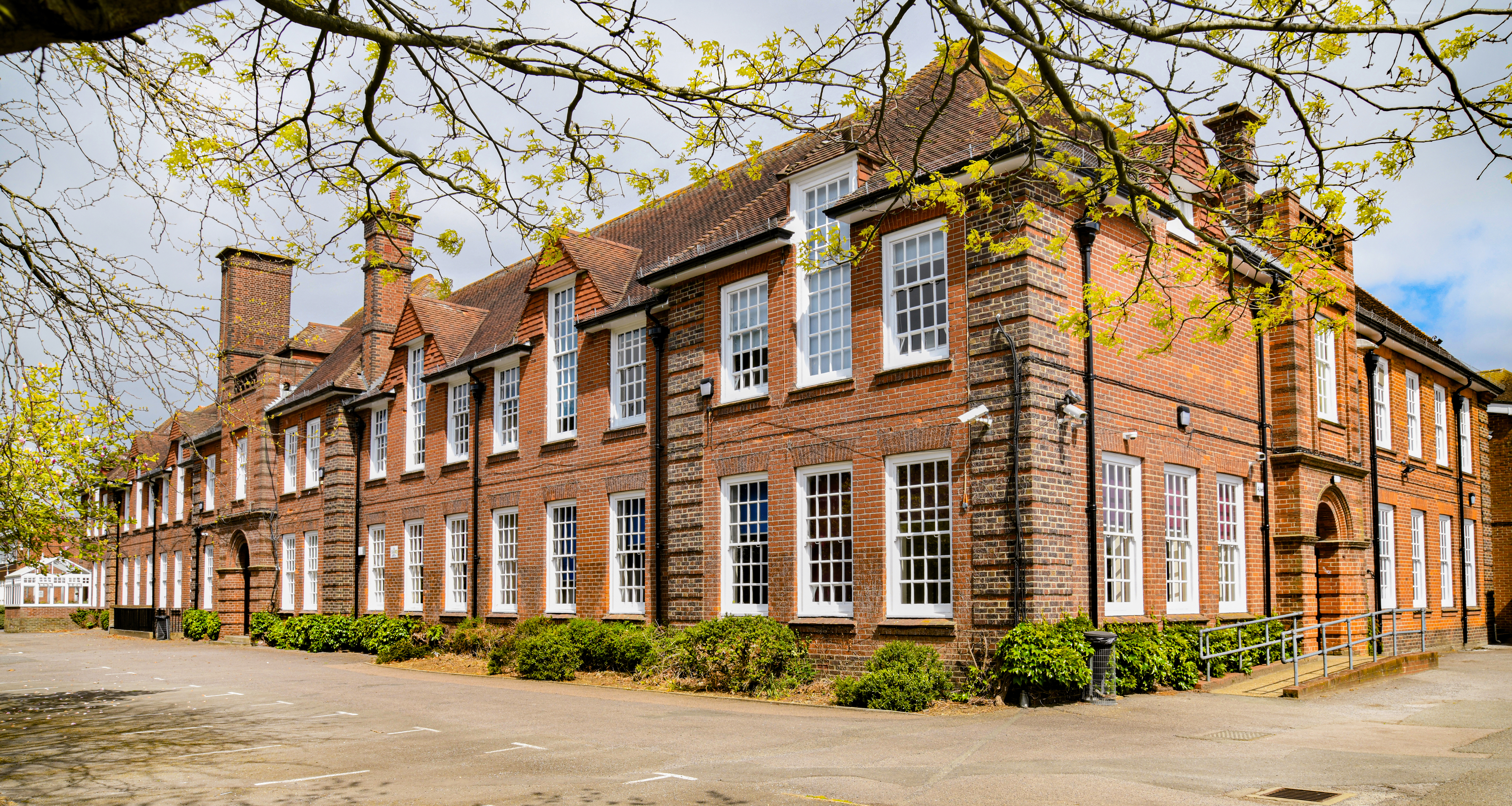

Location
- Maidstone Road; Ashford, Kent, TN24 8UD; England; 51.1543°N 0.8641°E

Information
- Type: Grammar school; Academy
- Motto: Ad caelestia sequere (Latin: "Reach for the stars")
- Established: 1904
- Local authority: Kent
- Department for Education URN: 136379 Tables
- Ofsted: Reports
- Head teacher: Duncan Beer
- Gender: Girls years 7-13 and boys years 12-13
- Age: 11 to 18
- Enrolment: 1,519 pupils
- Colours: Yellow, Black/White, Orange, Blue, Purple, Red and Green
- Website: www.highworth.kent.sch.uk

Highworth Grammar School is a selective secondary (grammar school) in Ashford, Kent. The school also admits boys to the sixth form. At an Ofsted inspection in January 2025, the school was rated 1 (outstanding) in all categories.

Highworth Grammar School is a selective school of over 1,519 pupils, of whom over 450 are in the Sixth Form, which admits both boys and girls. The school was established in 1904 and moved to its present site in 1928. Since that time there has been a considerable amount of rebuilding and expansion. The school converted to Academy status in 2011.

Pupils from the school were chosen to form part of a "guard of honour" for athletes at the opening ceremony of the 2012 Olympic Games, displaying artistic creations their school made to celebrate the event.

The headteacher is Duncan Beer, who has been in the role since September 2021.

== History ==
The school was formed as the Ashford County School for Girls in 1904. It was the first state secondary school for girls in Ashford. Initially, it was housed in the Assembly Rooms but then moved to Dover Place where there were fifty pupils and three teachers. Later there was another move to a large house in Station Road. Most girls had to pay fees although some won scholarships and could attend free. Some joined the school from as young as seven years old and were taught in a separate class until they reached secondary school age when they would join other entrants for specialist subject lessons.

As the school grew, the building at Station Road was not big enough and the girls attended some lessons in the South Kent College of Technology until the school moved to its present site in 1928.

The school suffered from considerable disruption during the Second World War. At first it became very crowded as members of another school, the Mary Datchelor School, were evacuated to Ashford and shared the premises. Later the pupils who lived in Ashford were themselves evacuated to Burford in Oxfordshire. The girls who lived in the villages still attended the school but sometimes had to spend hours in air-raid shelters.

In 1946, following the Education Act 1944, the school became the Ashford County Grammar School for Girls. In order to gain entry, girls now had to pass the eleven-plus examination and fee-paying was abandoned. After 1947, no girls were admitted before the age of eleven.

Numbers attending the school continued to grow and this, together with developments in the curriculum, necessitated building programmes in the 1950s and 1960s. It was at this time that most of the science laboratories, the hall, gym and dining area were added as well as art studios (now history rooms) and a sixth form common room (now the food technology room).

In 1973, the Thames-side Scheme was introduced in Ashford and the school changed its name to the Highworth School for Girls. Instead of transferring from primary school at the age of eleven, girls now came at thirteen after two years in a high school and they were admitted on the basis of assessments carried out at their previous schools instead of having to pass an examination.

In 1990, the age of entry reverted to eleven. The expansion of the school that this involved led to the construction of the Kingsdown building. Numbers of new entrants also grew so the school increased to six forms of entry in the 1990s. This led to the need for the Pym building which was opened in 2000. Since 2018 there are 7 forms of entry.

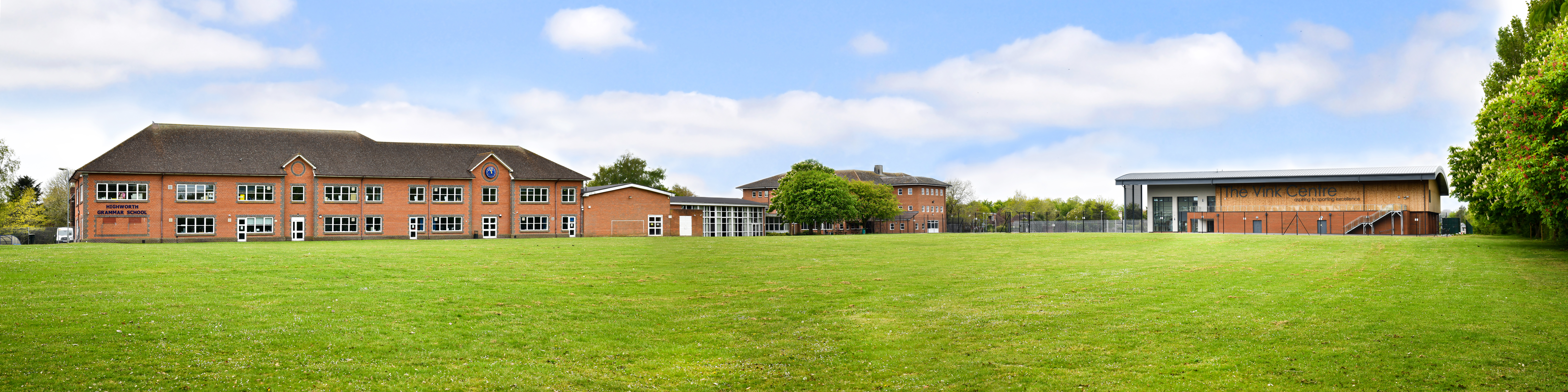
Highworth Grammar School from the Quantock Drive entrance.

== Notable former pupils ==
- Prof Cecilia Heyes, Professor of Psychology since 2009 at the University of Oxford, and from 2000 to 2008 at UCL
- Tom London, star of America's Got Talent and youngest member to enter The Magic Circle
- Penny Mallory, first woman to compete in a World Rally Car (WRC), and television presenter
- Jan Mark, children's writer, who wrote Thunder and Lightnings in 1976

=== Ashford County Grammar School for Girls ===
- Patsy Byrne, television actress
