= Patricia K. Kuhl =

American psychologist

- Born: November 5, 1946 (age 79); Mitchell, South Dakota, United States

Academic background
- Education: St. Cloud State University, (B.A.); University of Minnesota, (M.A.), (Ph.D.)

Patricia Katherine Kuhl (born Mitchell, South Dakota, November 5, 1946) is a professor of speech and hearing sciences and co-director of the Institute for Learning & Brain Sciences at the University of Washington. She specializes in language acquisition and the neural bases of language, and she has also conducted research on language development in autism and computer speech recognition. Kuhl currently serves as an associate editor for the journals Journal of the Acoustical Society of America, Neuroscience, and Developmental Science.

== Biography ==
Kuhl received a B.A. in speech science from St. Cloud State University in 1967, an M.A. in speech science from the University of Minnesota in 1971, and a Ph.D. from the University of Minnesota in speech science and psychology in 1973. She completed a postdoctoral fellowship at the Central Institute for the Deaf at Washington University in St. Louis in 1976. Since 1977, she has been employed as a professor of Speech and Hearing Sciences at the University of Washington, with adjunct appointments in the departments of Linguistics, Psychology, Otolaryngology, Neuroscience, and Education. She serves as a co-director of the UW Institute for Brain and Learning Sciences, an interdisciplinary scientific research center on human learning, with her husband, Andrew Meltzoff.

== Research ==
Kuhl is internationally recognized for her research on early language and brain development, and studies that show how young children learn. Kuhl's work has played a major role in demonstrating how early exposure to language alters the brain. It has implications for critical periods in development, for bilingual education and reading readiness, for developmental disabilities involving language, and for research on computer understanding of speech.

=== Native Language Magnet/Neural Commitment Theory ===
Kuhl has proposed the Native Language Magnet/Neural Commitment Theory to account for the developmental change by which infants' ability to discriminate speech sounds becomes increasingly specific to their native language as they age. The model shows that infants use their computational abilities to "crack" the speech code and that infants' social skills play an important role in learning.

=== Recognition ===
Kuhl was one of six scientists invited to the White House in 1997 to make a presentation at President and Mrs. Clinton's Conference on Early Learning and the Brain. In 2001, she was invited to make a presentation at President and Mrs. Bush's White House Summit on Early Cognitive Development: Ready to Read, Ready to Learn.

Kuhl's work has been widely covered by the media. She has appeared in the Discovery television series "The Baby Human"; the NOVA series "The Mind"; "The Power of Ideas" on PBS; and "The Secret Life of the Brain," also on PBS. She has discussed her research findings on early learning and the brain on The Today Show, Good Morning America, CBS Evening News, NBC Nightly News, NHK, CNN, and in The New York Times, Time, TED (conference), and Newsweek.

Kuhl is a member of the National Academy of Sciences USA, American Academy of Arts and Sciences, the Rodin Academy, and the Norwegian Academy of Science and Letters. She has also been elected a fellow in the American Association for the Advancement of Science, the American Psychological Association, the Cognitive Science Society, and the Association for Psychological Science.

Kuhl was awarded the Silver Medal in 1997 and the Gold Medal in 2008 from the Acoustical Society of America, the Kenneth Craik Research Award from Cambridge University in 2005, and the Gold Medal from the acoustics branch of the American Institute of Physics in 2008. She received the University of Washington's Faculty Lectureship Award in 1998, and she was awarded the University of Minnesota’s Outstanding Achievement Award in 2007.

In 2018 she received the APA Award for Distinguished Scientific Contributions to Psychology from the American Psychological Association.

- 2021 Karl Spencer Lashley Award
