= Vittorio Gallese =

Italian physiologist (born 1959)

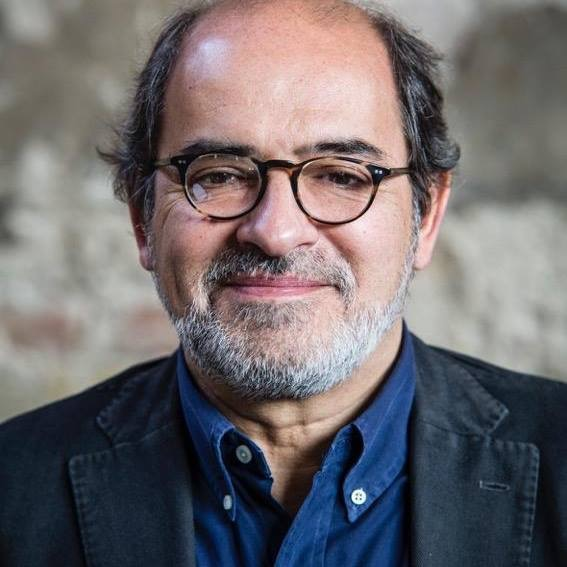
- Born: 1959 (age 66–67); Parma, Italy
- Education: University of Parma, Parma; Italy
- Known for: Discoverer of mirror neurons
- Scientific career
- Fields: Neurophysiology & Social neuroscience
- Workplaces: University of Parma, Italy (professor)

Vittorio Gallese is professor of Psychobiology at the University of Parma, Italy, and was professor in Experimental Aesthetics at the University of London, UK (2016–2018). He is an expert in neurophysiology, cognitive neuroscience, social neuroscience, and philosophy of mind. Gallese is one of the discoverers of mirror neurons. His research attempts to elucidate the functional organization of brain mechanisms underlying social cognition, including action understanding, empathy, language, mindreading and aesthetic experience.

== Background ==
Vittorio Gallese, MD, studied medicine at the University of Parma, Parma, Italy, and was awarded a degree in Neurology in 1990. He is a Full Professor of physiology in the Department of Neuroscience of the University of Parma, Full Professor in Experimental Aesthetics at the Institute of Philosophy, School of Advanced Study of the University of London, UK and Adjunct Senior Research Scholar at the Dept. of Art History and Archeology, Columbia University, New York, USA. He is coordinator of the PhD Program in Neuroscience and Director of the Doctoral School of Medicine of the University of Parma. As a cognitive neuroscientist, his research focuses on the relationship between the sensory-motor system and cognition, both in non-human primates and humans using a variety of neurophysiological and functional neuroimaging techniques applied to the study of intersubjectivity, empathy, language, mindreading and aesthetics. He also applies neuroscientific methods to study autism and schizophrenia. Among his major contributions is the discovery, together with the colleagues of Parma, of mirror neurons, and the elaboration of a theoretical model of basic aspects of social cognition, Embodied Simulation Theory. For many years he has been involved in collaborations with scholars of other disciplines, like philosophy of mind (collaborating with Alvin Goldman, Thomas Metzinger and Corrado Sinigaglia), cognitive linguistics (collaborating with George Lakoff and Art Glenberg), aesthetics (collaborating with David Freedberg and Hava Aldouby), psychiatry and psychoanalysis (collaborating with Morris Eagle, Paolo Migone, Thomas Fuchs, and Josef Parnas) and narratology (collaborating with Hannah Wojchiehowski).

Gallese has been doing research at the University of Lausanne, Switzerland, at the Nihon University, Tokyo, Japan, at the University of California at Berkeley and at the Berlin School of Mind and Brain of the Humboldt University of Berlin. He has been George Miller visiting professor at the University of California at Berkeley. In 2007 he received together with Giacomo Rizzolatti and Leonardo Fogassi the Grawemeyer Award for Psychology, for the discovery of mirror neurons. He received the Doctor Honoris Causa from the Catholic University of Leuven, Belgium in 2009. He received the Arnold Pfeffer Prize for Neuropsychoanalysis from the International Society of Neuropsychoanalysis, New York, U.S.A. in 2010, the Musatti Prize from the Italian Psychoanalytic Society in 2013, the Kosmos Fellowship from the Berlin School of Mind and Brain in 2014, the Einstein Fellowship for 2016–2020, and the Alexander von Humboldt Forschung Preis in 2019.

Gallese has published over 300 papers in international peer-reviewed journals and edited books and three books.

== Embodied simulation theory and mirror neurons ==
Gallese is probably best well known for two interconnecting areas of research – mirror neurons and embodied simulation theory. Embodied simulation theory is, amongst other things, a theory of social cognition – a theory of how it is we understand others' actions, basic intentions, emotions and sensations. Gallese states "that the fundamental mechanism that allows us a direct experiential grasp of the mind of others is not conceptual reasoning but direct simulation of the observed events through the mirror mechanism." Gallese states that the mirror mechanism in humans is the neurophysiological substrate that underpins the embodied simulatory process. Gallese posits the simulation process plays a constitutive role in basic forms of mind reading. Gallese has defended simulation theory and the role mirror neurons play in simulation over the course of several decades and has recently done so in response to criticisms from de Bruin and Gallagher, who argue that one of simulation theories central theoretical notions, reuse in bodily format – underpinned by the MNS, lacks explanatory power. Gallese argued in response that "the notion of reuse of mental states represented with a bodily format provides a convincing simulational account of the mirroring mechanism (MM) and its role in mind-reading."

== Embodied simulation theory: space and objects ==
Observing the world is more complex than the mere activation of the visual brain. Vision is multimodal: it encompasses the activation of motor, somatosensory and emotion-related brain networks. Any intentional relation entertained with the external world has an intrinsic pragmatic nature, hence it always bears a motor content. The same motor circuits that control our motor behavior also map the space around us, the objects at hand in that very same space, thus defining and shaping in motor terms their representational content. The space around us is defined by the motor potentialities of our body. Motor neurons also respond to visual, tactile and auditory stimuli. Indeed, premotor neurons controlling the movements of the upper arm also respond to tactile stimuli applied to it, to visual stimuli moved within the arm's peripersonal space, or to auditory stimuli also coming from the same peri-personal space. The same applies to artifacts, like three-dimensional objects. The manipulable objects we look at are classified by the motor brain as potential targets of the interactions we might entertain with them. Premotor and parietal 'canonical neurons' control the grasping and manipulation of objects and also respond to their mere observation. The functional architecture of embodied simulation seems to constitute a basic characteristic of our brain, making possible our rich and diversified experiences of space, objects and other individuals, being at the basis of our capacity to empathize with them."

== See also ==
- Mirror neurons
- Empathy
- Motor cognition
- Common coding theory
- Affective neuroscience
- Psychoanalysis
- Philosophy of mind
- Theory of mind
- Neuroscience
- Social neuroscience
- Language
- Aesthetics
- Neuroaesthetics

== Editorial duties ==
- Associate Editor of Psychopathology
- Member of the Editorial Board of Social Cognitive and Affective Neuroscience
- Member of the Editorial Board of Cognitive Neuroscience
- Member of the Editorial Board of Biological Theory
- Member of the Editorial Board of Phenomenology and the Cognitive Sciences
- Member of the Editorial Board of Neuropsychoanalysis
- Member of the Scientific Committee of the Fondation Fyssen Paris (France).

== Selected books ==
- Stamenov, N.I., and Gallese, V. (2002). Mirror Neurons and the Evolution of Brain and Language. Amsterdam: John Benjamins Publishing Co.
- Ammaniti, M. & Gallese, V. (2014) The Birth of Intersubjectivity. Psychodynamics, Neurobiology and the Self. W. W. Norton & Company, pp. 236.
- Gallese, V. e Guerra, M. (2015) Lo Schermo Empatico. Cinema e Neuroscienze. Milano: Raffaello Cortina Editore, pp. 350.
- Gallese, V. e Guerra, M. (2020) The Empathic Screen. Cinema and Neuroscience. Oxford: Oxford University Press, pp. 272.

== Selected references ==
- Gallese, V.; Fadiga, L.; Fogassi, L.; Rizzolatti, G. (1996). "Action recognition in the premotor cortex". Brain. 119 (2): 593–609. doi:10.1093/brain/119.2.593. PMID 8800951.
- Gallese, V.; Goldman, A. (1998). "Mirror neurons and the simulation theory of mind-reading". Trends in Cognitive Sciences. 2 (12): 493–501. doi:10.1016/s1364-6613(98)01262-5. PMID 21227300. S2CID 10108122.
- Gallese, V (2000). "The inner sense of action: agency and motor representations". Journal of Consciousness Studies. 7: 23–40.
- Gallese, V (2001). "The "Shared Manifold" Hypothesis: from mirror neurons to empathy". Journal of Consciousness Studies. 8 (5–7): 33–50.
- Gallese, V (2003). "The manifold nature of interpersonal relations: The quest for a common mechanism". Phil. Trans. R. Soc. Lond. B. 358 (1431): 517–528. doi:10.1098/rstb.2002.1234. PMC 1693141. PMID 12689377.
- Gallese, V (2005). "Embodied simulation: from neurons to phenomenal experience". Phenomenology and the Cognitive Sciences. 4: 23–48. doi:10.1007/s11097-005-4737-z. S2CID 18022174.
- Freedberg, D.; Gallese, V. (2007). "Motion, emotion and empathy in esthetic experience". Trends in Cognitive Sciences. 11 (5): 197–203. doi:10.1016/j.tics.2007.02.003. PMID 17347026. S2CID 1996468.
- Rochat, M.; Serra, E.; Fadiga, L.; Gallese, V. (2008). "The evolution of social cognition: Goal familiarity shapes monkeys' action understanding". Current Biology. 18 (3): 227–232. Bibcode:2008CBio...18..227R. doi:10.1016/j.cub.2007.12.021. PMID 18221878. S2CID 16620624.
- Ebisch, S.J.H.; Perrucci, M.G.; Ferretti, A.; Del Gratta, C.; Romani, G.L.; Gallese, V. (2008). "The sense of touch: embodied simulation in a visuo-tactile mirroring mechanism for the sight of any touch". Journal of Cognitive Neuroscience. 20 (9): 1611–1623. doi:10.1162/jocn.2008.20111. PMID 18345991. S2CID 2598298.
- Gallese, V.; Rochat, M.; Cossu, G.; Sinigaglia, C. (2009). "Motor Cognition and its role in the phylogeny and ontogeny of intentional understanding". Developmental Psychology. 45 (1): 103–113. doi:10.1037/a0014436. PMID 19209994. S2CID 16846392.
- Gallese, V (2008). "Mirror neurons and the social nature of language: The neural exploitation hypothesis". Social Neuroscience. 3 (3–4): 317–333. doi:10.1080/17470910701563608. PMID 18979384. S2CID 6329445.
- Gallese, V.; Sinigaglia, C. (2010). "The bodily self as power for action". Neuropsychologia. 48 (3): 746–755. doi:10.1016/j.neuropsychologia.2009.09.038. PMID 19835895. S2CID 2384477.
- Gallese, V.; Sinigaglia, C. (2011). "What is so special with Embodied Simulation". Trends in Cognitive Sciences. 15 (11): 512–519. doi:10.1016/j.tics.2011.09.003. PMID 21983148. S2CID 15286074.
- Caruana, F; Jezzini, A; Sbriscia-Fioretti, B; Rizzolatti, G; Gallese, V (2011). "Emotional and Social Behaviors Elicited by Electrical Stimulation of the Insula in the Macaque Monkey". Curr Biol. 21 (3): 195–9. Bibcode:2011CBio...21..195C. doi:10.1016/j.cub.2010.12.042. PMID 21256020. S2CID 15418972.
- Gallese, V.; Sinigaglia, C. (2011). "How the body in action shapes the self". Journal of Consciousness Studies. 18: 117–143.
- Wojciehowski, H.C.; Gallese, V. (2011). "How stories make us feel. Toward an embodied narratology". California Italian Studies. 2: 1.
- Glenberg, A.; Gallese, V. (2012). "Action-based language: A theory of language acquisition production and comprehension". Cortex. 48 (7): 905–922. doi:10.1016/j.cortex.2011.04.010. PMID 21601842. S2CID 206984079.
- Ebisch, S.J.H.; Salone, A.; Ferri, F.; De Berardis, D.; Mantini, D.; Ferro, F.M.; Romani, G.L.; Gallese, V. (2012). "Out of touch with reality? Social perception in first episode schizophrenia". Soc Cogn Affect Neurosci. 8 (4): 394–403. doi:10.1093/scan/nss012. PMC 3624951. PMID 22275166.
- Ferri, F.; Frassinetti, F.; Ardizzi, M.; Costantini, M.; Gallese, V. (2012). "A sensorimotor network for the bodily self". J. Cogn. Neurosci. 24 (7): 1584–95. doi:10.1162/jocn_a_00230. PMID 22452562. S2CID 1172445.
- Umiltà, M.A.; Berchio, C.; Sestito, M.; Freedberg, D.; Gallese, V. (2012). "Abstract art and cortical motor activation: An EEG study". Frontiers in Human Neuroscience. 6: 311. doi:10.3389/fnhum.2012.00311. PMC 3499799. PMID 23162456.
- Gallese, V.; Guerra, M. (2012). "Embodying Movies: Embodied Simulation and Film Studies". Cinema: Journal of Philosophy and the Moving Image. 3: 183–210.
- Ferri, F; Costantini, M; Salone, A; Di Iorio, G; Martinotti, G; Chiarelli, A; Merla, A; Di Giannantonio, M; Gallese, V (2013). "Upcoming tactile events and body ownership in schizophrenia". Schizophr. Res. 152 (1): 51–7. doi:10.1016/j.schres.2013.06.026. PMID 23835002. S2CID 1235745.
- Gallese, V (2013). "Mirror neurons, embodied simulation and a second-person approach to mindreading". Cortex. 49 (10): 2954–2956. doi:10.1016/j.cortex.2013.09.008. PMID 24209736. S2CID 2955254.
- Gallese, V (Apr 2014). "Bodily Selves in Relation: Embodied simulation as second-person perspective on intersubjectivity". Philos Trans R Soc Lond B Biol Sci. 369 (1644) 20130177. doi:10.1098/rstb.2013.0177. PMC 4006180. PMID 24778374.
- Heimann, K; Umiltà, MA; Guerra, M; Gallese, V (2014). "Moving mirrors: a high-density EEG study investigating the effect of camera movements on motor cortex activation during action observation". J Cogn Neurosci. 26 (9): 2087–101. doi:10.1162/jocn_a_00602. PMID 24666130. S2CID 17604033..
- Ioannou, S.; Gallese, V.; Merla, A. (2014). "Thermal infrared imaging in psychophysiology: Potentialities and limits". Psychophysiology. 51 (10): 951–63. doi:10.1111/psyp.12243. PMC 4286005. PMID 24961292.
- Gallese, V.; Ferri, F. (2014). "Psychopathology and the bodily self. The case of schizophrenia". Psychopathology. 47 (6): 357–64. doi:10.1159/000365638. PMID 25359279. S2CID 14298390.
- Gallese V. (2014) Mirror neurons and the perception-action link. In: Oxford Handbook of Cognitive Neuroscience. S. Kosslyn & K. Ochsner (Eds). Oxford: Oxford University Press. Vol. 2, pp. 244–256.
- Uithol, S; Franca, M; Heimann, K; Marzoli, D; Capotosto, P; Tommasi, L; Gallese, V (2015). "Single-pulse Transcranial Magnetic Stimulation Reveals Contribution of Premotor Cortex to Object Shape Recognition". Brain Stimul. 8 (5): 953–6. doi:10.1016/j.brs.2015.04.012. PMID 26026284. S2CID 37723157.
- Gallese V., Cuccio V. (2015) Embodied Simulation: A Paradigm for the Constitution of Self and Others. A Reply to Christian Pfeiffer. In: Metzinger. T. & Windt, J.M. (eds): Open MIND. Frankfurt: MIND Group, pp. 1–5.
- Gallese V., Gattara A. (2015) Embodied simulation, Aesthetics and Architecture: An experimental aesthetic approach. In: Mind in Architecture: Neuroscience, Embodiment and the Future of Design, Sarah Robinson and Juhani Pallasmaa, eds., Boston, MA, MIT Press, pp. 161–179.
