= Andrew N. Meltzoff =

American psychologist

- Born: February 9, 1950 (age 76)
- Spouse: Patricia K. Kuhl

Academic background
- Education: Harvard University; Oxford University
- Doctoral advisor: Jerome Bruner

Academic work
- Discipline: Psychologist
- Sub-discipline: Expert on infant and child development
- Institutions: University of Washington
- Notable ideas: "Like me" hypothesis

Andrew N. Meltzoff (born February 9, 1950) is an American psychologist and an internationally recognized expert on infant and child development. His discoveries about infant imitation greatly advanced the scientific understanding of early cognition, personality and brain development.

== Background ==
Meltzoff received a B.A. from Harvard University in 1972 and a D.Phil. (Ph.D.) from Oxford University in 1976 with Jerome Bruner as his thesis advisor. A professor of psychology at the University of Washington since 1988, he is currently co-director of the University of Washington Institute for Learning and Brain Sciences. The institute is an interdisciplinary scientific research center on human learning.

He is married to speech and hearing scientist and language acquisition researcher Patricia K. Kuhl.

== Early research ==
In 1977, Science published the ground-breaking paper "Imitation of Facial and Manual Gestures by Human Neonates" by Meltzoff, who was still at Oxford, and M. Keith Moore of the University of Washington. According to the abstract,

Infants between 12 and 21 days of age can imitate both facial and manual gestures; this behavior cannot be explained in terms of either conditioning or innate releasing mechanisms. Such imitation implies that human neonates can equate their own unseen behaviors with gestures they see others perform.

Six infants were each shown three facial gestures and one manual gesture, sequentially. Their responses were videotaped and scored by observers who did not know which gesture the infants had seen. The statistically significant results showed that infants of this young age were able to imitate all four gestures.

The experiment was ground-breaking because it showed infant imitation of adults at a much earlier age than was thought possible. Jean Piaget, for instance, had thought that infants reached the stage of facial imitation at 8 to 12 months. The study also showed early facial imitation, something previously thought to be impossible at this young age because of its necessarily crossmodal nature. (Infants can see others' faces but not their own; they can feel their own facial movements, but not those of others.) The findings had implications not only for theoretical psychology, but also for the study of memory, learning, language acquisition, and socialization.

A similar study was later done with a group of 40 infants with a mean age of 72 hours (youngest 42 minutes), with the same results, showing that the intermodal mapping infants displayed was unlikely to be learned. However, later studies have suggested that while neonatal imitation of tongue protrusion is widespread, the findings for the imitation of other gestures at this young age are more mixed.

== Methodological innovations ==
Preverbal infant psychology is notoriously difficult to study. Meltzoff and his colleagues had to develop new techniques for eliciting and interpreting infant responses to stimuli. One method was measuring an infant's visual preference for an object. In one study, infants were allowed to touch but not see a distinctively shaped object. Later they were shown (but could not touch) that object and a different object. The length of time they gazed at each object was measured. Infants looked longer at the object they had previously touched, thus demonstrating an ability to recognize the object with a different sense.

In another experiment, babies' sucking on a pacifier was recorded, and a picture was shown to them. When the sucking stopped, the picture disappeared. Babies were found to suck longer when the picture showed a familiar face than when it showed an unfamiliar one.

== Later research ==
Later research has included the investigation of memory; communications development in young children with autism; intention;. In collaboration with neuroscientist Jean Decety, Meltzoff has started to investigate the neural mechanisms underpinning imitation empathy and gaze-following.

== Theory ==
Based on his work on imitation, Meltzoff has developed the "like me" hypothesis of infant development. This involves three steps. First, there is an intrinsic, supramodal connection in the infant mind between observed acts and similar executed acts (the correspondence reported in the 1977 and 1983 studies cited above). Secondly, infants experience a regular association between their own acts and their own underlying mental states. This is based on everyday experience. Third, infants project their own internal experiences onto others performing similar acts. As a result, infants begin to acquire an understanding of other minds and their mental states (desires, visual perception and basic emotions, for instance).

This hypothesis suggests that it is imitation that is inborn, and the understanding of other's mental states is a consequence. Other researchers have suggested the opposite, that imitation is a consequence of an understanding of others. But Meltzoff's early imitation studies clearly favor the former possibility.

== Honors ==
- National Institutes of Health MERIT Award
- Outstanding Research Award, Society for Developmental and Behavioral Pediatrics
- 2005: Kenneth Craik Award in Psychology, Cambridge University, England
- 2011: Presented the Paul B. Baltes Lecture at the Berlin-Brandenburg Academy of Sciences and Humanities
- Member of the Norwegian Academy of Science and Letters.
- 2016: Kurt Koffka Medal of Giessen University

== Selected works ==
- Meltzoff, A.N., & Moore, M.K. (1977). Imitation of Facial and Manual Gestures by Human Neonates. Science, 198, 75-78.
- Meltzoff, A.N., & Borton, R.W. (1979). Intermodal matching by human neonates. Nature, 282, 403-404]
- Gopnik, A., & Meltzoff, A. N. (1997). Words, thoughts, and theories. Cambridge, MA: MIT Press. ISBN 0-262-57126-9
- Gopnik, A., Meltzoff, A.N., & Kuhl, P.K. (2000). The scientist in the crib: What early learning tells us about the mind. New York: HarperCollins. ISBN 0-688-17788-3
- Meltzoff, A.N., & Prinz, W. (2002), Eds. The imitative mind: Development, evolution, and brain bases. Cambridge, England: Cambridge University Press. ISBN 0-521-80685-2
- Meltzoff, A.N., & Decety, J. (2003). "What imitation tells us about social cognition: A rapprochement between developmental psychology and cognitive neuroscience." The Philosophical Transactions of the Royal Society of London, 358, 491–500.
- Meltzoff, A.N. (2005). Imitation and other minds: The 'Like Me' hypothesis. In S. Hurley & N. Chater (Eds.), Perspectives on imitation: From cognitive neuroscience to social science (pp. 55–77). Cambridge: MIT Press.
