= Roshan Cools =

Dutch neuroscientist

- Born: 10 June 1975 (age 51)
- Education: University of Groningen (MA); University of Cambridge (PhD)
- Awards: Royal Society University Research Fellowship
- Scientific career
- Fields: Cognitive neuroscience
- Workplaces: University of Cambridge; University of California, Berkeley; Radboud University Nijmegen
- Thesis: Parkinson's disease as a model of dopamine-dependent fronto-striatal cognitive dysfunction (2003)
- Doctoral advisor: Trevor Robbins
- Website: roshancools.com

Roshan Cools (born 10 June 1975) is a professor of Cognitive Neuropsychiatry at Radboud University Nijmegen. She is interested in the motivational and cognitive control of human behaviour and how it is impacted by neuromodulation. She was elected to the Royal Netherlands Academy of Arts and Sciences in 2018.

== Early life and education ==
Cools was born in the Netherlands. Her father was a brain scientist and she recalls conversations about the brain and dopamine at the dinner table. Cools studied neuropsychology at the University of Groningen. She graduated cum laude in 1998 and moved to the United Kingdom. Cools worked with Trevor Robbins at the University of Cambridge on Parkinson's disease for her PhD awarded in 2002.

== Career and research ==
After earning her doctoral degree she worked as a Junior Research fellow and Royal Society Dorothy Hodgkin Fellow at St John's College, Cambridge. She moved to the University of California, Berkeley, where she spent two years as a postdoctoral fellow with Mark D'Esposito. She won a Royal Society University Research Fellowship which was based at the University of Cambridge.

In 2007 Cools moved back to the Netherlands, where she worked in the Centre for Cognitive Neuroimaging in the Donders Institute for Brain. At the Radboud University Nijmegen Cools leads the Motivational and Cognitive Control Lab. She was promoted to Full Professor in 2011. She studies the role of neuromodulators (dopamine and serotonin) in the control of decision making. She showed that the genes associated with dopamine impact how we learn from the long-term consequences of decisions, whilst serotonin is more strongly associated with short-term choices. She has also shown that people who gamble have increased levels of dopamine in their brains, whilst people who are addicted to drugs have average or lower than normal levels of dopamine.

She used her expertise in decision making to show that dominant individuals are avid social learners; whilst they value their independence, they rely on social learning in complex decision making tasks. She is interested in advancing understanding of neuropsychiatric disorders, including impulse control disorder, Attention Deficit Hyperactivity Disorder (ADHD) and Parkinson's disease. She demonstrated that people suffering from schizophrenia have motivation deficits from very early stages of their diagnoses, which are unrelated to their treatments.

Cools is interested in the mechanisms by which we exert willpower and what happens to willpower in people with ADHD. She believes that the goals that are characteristic of human behaviour can be classified as motivational (i.e. maximise reward) and cognitive (i.e. complete task). Her research considers the interactions between motivational and cognitive control. Cools demonstrated that the neural networks of psychopathic criminals are different to that or normal people, with a strong focus on reward and a lack of self-control.

She was appointed to the Advisory Council for Science and Technology Policy to the Dutch government in 2014.

=== Awards and honours ===
Her awards and honours include;

- 2012 James McDonnell Scholar Award
- 2013 Elected Fellow of the Association for Psychological Science
- 2015 Netherlands Organisation for Scientific Research Vici Award
- 2016 Elected Member of the Academia Europaea
- 2017 Royal Netherlands Academy of Arts and Sciences Ammodo Award in Social Sciences
- 2018 Elected Member of the International Neuropsychological Society
- 2018 Elected Member of the Royal Netherlands Academy of Arts and Sciences
- 2019 Elected to the Faculty of 1000

She delivered a TED Talk at Radboud University Nijmegen in 2013.

=== Selected publications ===
Her publications include;

- Cools, Roshan; D'Esposito, Mark (2011). "Inverted-U–shaped dopamine actions on human working memory and cognitive control". Biological Psychiatry. 69 (12): 113–125. doi:10.1016/j.biopsych.2011.03.028. PMC 3111448. PMID 21531388.
- Cools, Roshan (2006). "Dopaminergic modulation of cognitive function-implications for L-DOPA treatment in Parkinson's disease". Neuroscience & Biobehavioral Reviews. 30 (1): 1–23. doi:10.1016/j.neubiorev.2005.03.024. PMID 15935475. S2CID 329869.
- Cools, Roshan; Barker, Roger A.; Sahakian, Barbara J. (2001). "Enhanced or impaired cognitive function in Parkinson's disease as a function of dopaminergic medication and task demands". Cerebral Cortex. 11 (12): 1136–1143. doi:10.1093/cercor/11.12.1136. PMID 11709484.
