= Christian Keysers =

French-German neuroscientist (born 1973)

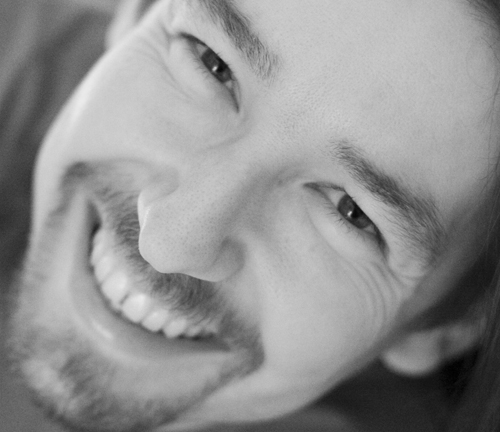
- Born: Christian Keysers; 27 June 1973 (age 53)
- Occupation: Scientist
- Employer: Netherlands Institute for Neuroscience

Christian Keysers is a French and German neuroscientist.

== Education and career ==
He finished his school education at the European School, Munich and studied psychology and biology at the University of Konstanz, the Ruhr University Bochum, University of Massachusetts Boston, the Shepens eye research Institute of the Harvard Medical School as well as with Marvin Minsky at the Massachusetts Institute of Technology. He then started his research career at the University of St Andrews by investigating cells in the temporal cortex with David Perrett, and described cells that respond when the monkey views particular faces in a way that correlates with conscious perception. After that, he moved to the University of Parma where he was part of the team that discovered auditory mirror neurons in the frontal cortex of the macaque monkey. He then expanded the notion of mirror neurons to emotions and sensations, by showing that your somatosensory cortex is active not only when you are being touched, but also if you see someone else being touched, and that the insular cortex is active not only if people feel disgusted, but also if they see someone else being disgusted. Together this indicated a general principle in which people process the actions, sensations and emotions of others by vicariously activating their own actions, sensations and emotions. Jointly, this work laid the foundation of the neuroscientific investigation of empathy. In 2004, Keysers and collaborator Gazzola opened the Social Brain Lab at the University of Groningen where they provided evidence for abnormal activity in somatosensory, motor and limbic brain structures in patients with abnormal empathy and that rats experience distress when they witnessed another animal in distress. This showed that rats can experience emotional contagion, a predecessor of empathy

In 2010, Keysers moved to the Netherlands Institute for Neuroscience (NIN) where he is currently a department head and leads the Social Brain Lab together with neuroscientist Valeria Gazzola. He is also a full professor at the University of Amsterdam. His team uncovered a mechanism responsible for emotional contagion by showing that rats have neurons in the cingulate cortex, a region involved in nociception, that respond both when a rat experiences pain and when it witnesses another animal experience pain, providing the first systematic evidence for the presence of emotional mirror neurons in the mammalian brain. Deactivating this brain region greatly reduced emotional contagion. The team also showed that rats are averse to harming other rats, and that this also depends on the same region of the cingulate cortex.

He has published a book called 'The Empathic Brain'.

== Awards and grants ==
Keysers has received the European Research Council consolidator grant, the Marie Skłodowska-Curie Actions Excellence Grant of the European Commission, and the VICI grant of the Netherlands Organisation for Scientific Research. He is a recipient of the Marie Curie Excellence Award and is a member of the Academia Europaea and a fellow of the Association for Psychological Science.
