= Young Academy of Europe =

- Abbreviation: YAE
- Formation: 2012; 14 years ago
- Founders: Francesca Di Lodovico, Christian Doeller, Vicenzo Greco, Nicole Grobert, Oliver Heiri, Alban Kellerbauer, Ariel Knafo, Andre Mischke, Joerg Pelzer, Magnus Rueping, Thomas Schaefer, Raymond Schiffelers, Leif Schroeder, Petra Sijpesteijn, Simone Turchetti
- Members: Ca. 200 Fellows (FYAE)
- Official language: English
- Board of directors: Chair: Gemma Modinos, Vice-Chair: Moniek Tromp, Outgoing Chair: Mangala Srinivas, Treasurer: Zeila Zanolli, Secretary: Katell Laveant, Selection Committee Chair: Arild Husby, Selection Committee Vice-Chair: Giulia Grancini, Selection Committee Vice-Chair: Paweł Korpal, Recruitment Chair: Alina-Mihaela Badescu, Recruitment Vice-Chair: Katalin Solymosi, Communications Chair: Senem Aydın-Düzgit, Activities Chair: Scott Bremer
- Website: www.yacadeuro.org

The Young Academy of Europe (YAE) is a pan-European non-governmental academy of top young scientists and scholars.

The YAE was founded in 2012, with a mission to provide input to scientific exchange and science policy across all member states of the European Union or an Associated Country. YAE members are experts and leaders in their respective fields, who seek to provide a ‘younger’ perspective about the future of science and academia in Europe.

The ‘younger’ perspective provided by the YAE aims to resolve a tension between the fact that traditional academies are composed of scientists and scholars aged 50+, whilst scientists and scholars typically produce their most influential work in their thirties. Specifically, the YAE aims at improving the conditions in which young scientists and scholars across Europe will work and operate in the future, and thus contribute to policy and societal change. It endorses a network of top young researchers across all disciplines and across all countries of the European Research Area (ERA) in the pursuit to shape science policy with the perspective of a young generation.

The Young Academy of Europe was formally established as an independent association of top young researchers in Europe at a constitutive annual meeting hosted by COST in Brussels on 7/8 December 2012. This event followed from previous consultations of ERC Starting Grant grant holders in 2010/2011, and a kick-off meeting with 11 ERC grantholders from various member states, held in Paris in September 2011. At this meeting, possible routes towards establishing a Young Academy of Europe were discussed, including the definitions of its aims and activities.

YAE closely collaborates with national young academies, the Academia Europaea, the Initiative for Science in Europe, and other similar organizations and bodies.

The Academy awards every year the André Mischke YAE Prize for Science and Policy.
