= Evolutionary linguistics =

Sociobiological approaches to linguistics

Evolutionary linguistics or Darwinian linguistics is a sociobiological approach to the study of language. Evolutionary linguists consider linguistics as a subfield of sociobiology and evolutionary psychology. The approach is also closely linked with evolutionary anthropology, cognitive linguistics and biolinguistics. Studying languages as the products of nature, it is interested in the biological origin and development of language. Evolutionary linguistics is contrasted with humanistic approaches, especially structural linguistics.

A main challenge in this research is the lack of empirical data: there are no archaeological traces of early human language. Computational biological modelling and clinical research with artificial languages have been employed to fill in gaps of knowledge. Although biology is understood to shape the brain, which processes language, there is no clear link between biology and specific human language structures or linguistic universals.

For lack of a breakthrough in the field, there have been numerous debates about what kind of natural phenomenon language might be. Some researchers focus on the innate aspects of language. It is suggested that grammar has emerged adaptationally from the human genome, bringing about a language instinct; or that it depends on a single mutation which has caused a language organ to appear in the human brain. This is hypothesized to result in a crystalline grammatical structure underlying all human languages. Others suggest language is not crystallized, but fluid and ever-changing. Others, yet, liken languages to living organisms. Languages are considered analogous to a parasite or populations of mind-viruses. There is so far little scientific evidence for any of these claims, and some of them have been labelled as pseudoscience.

== History ==
=== 1863–1945: social Darwinism ===
Although pre-Darwinian theorists had compared languages to living organisms as a metaphor, the comparison was first taken literally in 1863 by the historical linguist August Schleicher who was inspired by Charles Darwin's On the Origin of Species. At the time there was not enough evidence to prove that Darwin's theory of natural selection was correct. Schleicher proposed that linguistics could be used as a testing ground for the study of the evolution of species. A review of Schleicher's book Darwinism as Tested by the Science of Language appeared in the first issue of Nature journal in 1870. Darwin reiterated Schleicher's proposition in his 1871 book The Descent of Man, claiming that languages are comparable to species, and that language change occurs through natural selection as words 'struggle for life'. Darwin believed that languages had evolved from animal mating calls. Darwinists considered the concept of language creation as unscientific.

August Schleicher and his friend Ernst Haeckel were keen gardeners and regarded the study of cultures as a type of botany, with different species competing for the same living space. Similar ideas became later advocated by politicians who wanted to appeal to working class voters, not least by the national socialists who subsequently included the concept of struggle for living space in their agenda. Highly influential until the end of World War II, social Darwinism was eventually banished from human sciences, leading to a strict separation of natural and sociocultural studies.

This gave rise to the dominance of structural linguistics in Europe. There had long been a dispute between the Darwinists and the French intellectuals with the topic of language evolution famously having been banned by the Paris Linguistic Society as early as in 1866. Ferdinand de Saussure proposed structuralism to replace evolutionary linguistics in his Course in General Linguistics, published posthumously in 1916. The structuralists rose to academic political power in human and social sciences in the aftermath of the student revolts of Spring 1968, establishing the Sorbonne as an international centrepoint of humanistic thinking.

=== From 1959 onwards: genetic determinism ===
In the United States, structuralism was however fended off by the advocates of behavioural psychology; a linguistics framework nicknamed as 'American structuralism'. It was eventually replaced by the approach of Noam Chomsky who published a modification of Louis Hjelmslev's formal structuralist theory, claiming that syntactic structures are innate. An active figure in peace demonstrations in the 1950s and 1960s, Chomsky rose to academic political power following Spring 1968 at the MIT.

Chomsky became an influential opponent of the French intellectuals during the following decades, and his supporters successfully confronted the post-structuralists in the Science Wars of the late 1990s. The shift of the century saw a new academic funding policy where interdisciplinary research became favoured, effectively directing research funds to biological humanities. The decline of structuralism was evident by 2015 with Sorbonne having lost its former spirit.

Chomsky eventually claimed that syntactic structures are caused by a random mutation in the human genome, proposing a similar explanation for other human faculties such as ethics. But Steven Pinker argued in 1990 that they are the outcome of evolutionary adaptations.

=== From 1976 onwards: Neo-Darwinism ===
At the same time when the Chomskyan paradigm of biological determinism defeated humanism, it was losing its own clout within sociobiology. It was reported likewise in 2015 that generative grammar was under fire in applied linguistics and in the process of being replaced with usage-based linguistics; a derivative of Richard Dawkins's memetics. It is a concept of linguistic units as replicators. Following the publication of memetics in Dawkins's 1976 nonfiction bestseller The Selfish Gene, many biologically inclined linguists, frustrated with the lack of evidence for Chomsky's Universal Grammar, grouped under different brands including a framework called Cognitive Linguistics (with capitalised initials), and 'functional' (adaptational) linguistics (not to be confused with functional linguistics) to confront both Chomsky and the humanists. The replicator approach is today dominant in evolutionary linguistics, applied linguistics, cognitive linguistics and linguistic typology; while the generative approach has maintained its position in general linguistics, especially syntax; and in computational linguistics.

== View of linguistics ==
Evolutionary linguistics is part of a wider framework of Universal Darwinism. In this view, linguistics is seen as an ecological environment for research traditions struggling for the same resources. According to David Hull, these traditions correspond to species in biology. Relationships between research traditions can be symbiotic, competitive or parasitic. An adaptation of Hull's theory in linguistics is proposed by William Croft. He argues that the Darwinian method is more advantageous than linguistic models based on physics, structuralist sociology, or hermeneutics.

== Approaches ==
Evolutionary linguistics is often divided into functionalism and formalism, concepts which are not to be confused with functionalism and formalism in the humanistic reference. Functional evolutionary linguistics considers languages as adaptations to human mind. The formalist view regards them as crystallised or non-adaptational.

=== Functionalism (adaptationism) ===
The adaptational view of language is advocated by various frameworks of cognitive and evolutionary linguistics, with the terms 'functionalism' and 'Cognitive Linguistics' often being equated. It is hypothesised that the evolution of the animal brain provides humans with a mechanism of abstract reasoning which is a 'metaphorical' version of image-based reasoning. Language is not considered as a separate area of cognition, but as coinciding with general cognitive capacities, such as perception, attention, motor skills, and spatial and visual processing. It is argued to function according to the same principles as these.

It is thought that the brain links action schemes to form–meaning pairs which are called constructions. Cognitive linguistic approaches to syntax are called cognitive and construction grammar. Also deriving from memetics and other cultural replicator theories, these can study the natural or social selection and adaptation of linguistic units. Adaptational models reject a formal systemic view of language and consider language as a population of linguistic units.

The bad reputation of social Darwinism and memetics has been discussed in the literature, and recommendations for new terminology have been given. What correspond to replicators or mind-viruses in memetics are called linguemes in Croft's theory of Utterance Selection (TUS), and likewise linguemes or constructions in construction grammar and usage-based linguistics; and metaphors, frames or schemas in cognitive and construction grammar. The reference of memetics has been largely replaced with that of a Complex Adaptive System. In current linguistics, this term covers a wide range of evolutionary notions while maintaining the Neo-Darwinian concepts of replication and replicator population.

Functional evolutionary linguistics is not to be confused with functional humanistic linguistics.

=== Formalism (structuralism) ===
Advocates of formal evolutionary explanation in linguistics argue that linguistic structures are crystallised. Inspired by 19th century advances in crystallography, Schleicher argued that different types of languages are like plants, animals and crystals. The idea of linguistic structures as frozen drops was revived in tagmemics, an approach to linguistics with the goal to uncover divine symmetries underlying all languages, as if caused by the Creation.

In modern biolinguistics, the X-bar tree is argued to be like natural systems such as ferromagnetic droplets and botanic forms. Generative grammar considers syntactic structures similar to snowflakes. It is hypothesised that such patterns are caused by a mutation in humans.

The formal–structural evolutionary aspect of linguistics is not to be confused with structural linguistics.

== Evidence ==
There was some hope of a breakthrough with the discovery of the FOXP2 gene. There is little support, however, for the idea that FOXP2 is 'the grammar gene' or that it had much to do with the relatively recent emergence of syntactical speech. The idea that people have a language instinct is disputed. Memetics is sometimes discredited as pseudoscience and neurological claims made by evolutionary cognitive linguists have been likened to pseudoscience. All in all, there does not appear to be any evidence for the basic tenets of evolutionary linguistics beyond the fact that language is processed by the brain, and brain structures are shaped by genes.

== Criticism ==
Evolutionary linguistics has been criticised by advocates of (humanistic) structural and functional linguistics. Ferdinand de Saussure commented on 19th century evolutionary linguistics:

"Language was considered a specific sphere, a fourth natural kingdom; this led to methods of reasoning which would have caused astonishment in other sciences. Today one cannot read a dozen lines written at that time without being struck by absurdities of reasoning and by the terminology used to justify these absurdities"

Mark Aronoff, however, argues that historical linguistics had its golden age during the time of Schleicher and his supporters, enjoying a place among the hard sciences, and considers the return of Darwinian linguistics as a positive development. Esa Itkonen nonetheless deems the revival of Darwinism as a hopeless enterprise:

"There is ... an application of intelligence in linguistic change which is absent in biological evolution; and this suffices to make the two domains totally disanalogous ... [Grammaticalisation depends on] cognitive processes, ultimately serving the goal of problem solving, which intelligent entities like humans must perform all the time, but which biological entities like genes cannot perform. Trying to eliminate this basic difference leads to confusion."

Itkonen also points out that the principles of natural selection are not applicable because language innovation and acceptance have the same source which is the speech community. In biological evolution, mutation and selection have different sources. This makes it possible for people to change their languages, but not their genotype.

== See also ==
- Biolinguistics
- Evolutionary psychology of language
- FOXP2
- Origin of language
- Historical linguistics
- Phylogenetic tree
- Universal Darwinism
