= Women, Fire, and Dangerous Things =

1987 non-fiction book by George Lakoff

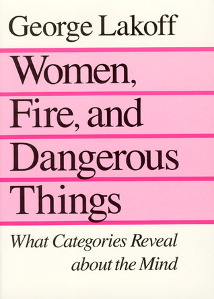
- Author: George Lakoff
- Subject: Cognitive linguistics
- Publisher: University of Chicago Press
- Publication date: 1987
- Pages: 632
- ISBN: 0-226-46803-8
- OCLC: 802823375

Women, Fire, and Dangerous Things: What Categories Reveal about the Mind is a 1987 non-fiction book by George Lakoff, an American cognitive linguist. Published by the University of Chicago Press, the book puts forward a model of cognition argued on the basis of semantics. The book emphasizes the centrality of metaphor, defined as the mapping of cognitive structures from one domain onto another, in the cognitive process. Women, Fire, and Dangerous Things explores the effects of cognitive metaphors, both culturally specific and human-universal, on the grammar per se of several languages, and the evidence of the limitations of the classical logical-positivist or Anglo-American School philosophical concept of the category usually used to explain or describe the scientific method.

The book's title was inspired by the noun class system of the Dyirbal language, in which the "feminine" category includes nouns for women, water, fire, violence, and certain animals. The book builds on earlier work in prototype theory by psychologist Eleanor Rosch in the 1970s, which showed that people tend to recognize certain members of a category as more "typical" than others (e.g., a robin is a more prototypical bird than a penguin). Lakoff applies these insights to linguistic semantics, arguing that categories are often structured around central prototypes with radial extensions.

== Synopsis ==
Lakoff critiques the classical theory of categorization, which assumes that all category members share a set of defining features, that category boundaries are strict, and that membership is all-or-none.

Instead, he argues that categories exhibit typicality effects, with some members more central than others, and that their boundaries are often fuzzy. He also contends that categories are shaped by Idealized Cognitive Models (ICMs) which are structured mental representations that can be culturally specific. Metaphor and metonymy are also posited as central mechanisms in structuring thought and language, not just rhetorical devices.

The book integrates findings from anthropology, psychology, and linguistics to support its claims. It introduces the concept of radial categories, in which related senses of a word or category form a network radiating from a central prototype.

== Influence ==
Women, Fire, and Dangerous Things is widely regarded as a manifesto for embodied cognition in linguistics, situating language as a product of human experience and bodily interaction with the world. The book's emphasis on metaphor as a core structuring principle of thought influenced research in conceptual metaphor theory, cognitive grammar, and conceptual blending.

The work also positioned cognitive linguistics in opposition to the then-dominant generative grammar paradigm and the symbolic computational model prevalent in early cognitive science. Lakoff argued that meaning cannot be reduced to abstract, amodal symbols divorced from human perception and cultural context.

== See also ==
- Image schema
- Structuralism
- Taxonomy (general)
- Prototype theory
- Conceptual metaphor
- Embodied cognition
