= Image schema =

Recurring structure in cognitive processes

Figure 1 - containment image schema

An image schema (both schemas and schemata are used as plural forms) is a recurring structure within our cognitive processes which establishes patterns of understanding and reasoning. As an understudy to embodied cognition, image schemas are formed from our bodily interactions, from linguistic experience, and from historical context. The term is introduced in Mark Johnson's book The Body in the Mind; in case study 2 of George Lakoff's Women, Fire and Dangerous Things: and further explained by Todd Oakley in The Oxford handbook of cognitive linguistics; by Rudolf Arnheim in Visual Thinking; by the collection From Perception to Meaning: Image Schemas in Cognitive Linguistics edited by Beate Hampe and Joseph E. Grady.

In contemporary cognitive linguistics, an image schema is considered an embodied prelinguistic structure of experience that motivates conceptual metaphor mappings. Learned in early infancy they are often described as spatiotemporal relationships that enable actions and describe characteristics of the environment. They exist both as static and dynamic version, describing both states and processes, compare Containment vs. Going_In/Out, and they are learned from all sensorimodalities.

Evidence for image schemas is drawn from a number of related disciplines, including work on cross-modal cognition in psychology, from spatial cognition in both linguistics and psychology, cognitive linguistics, and from neuroscience. The influences of image schemas is not only seen in cognitive linguistics and developmental psychology, but also in interface design and more recently, the theory has become of increased interest in artificial intelligence and cognitive robotics to help ground meaning.

== Johnson: From image schemas to abstract reasoning via metaphor ==
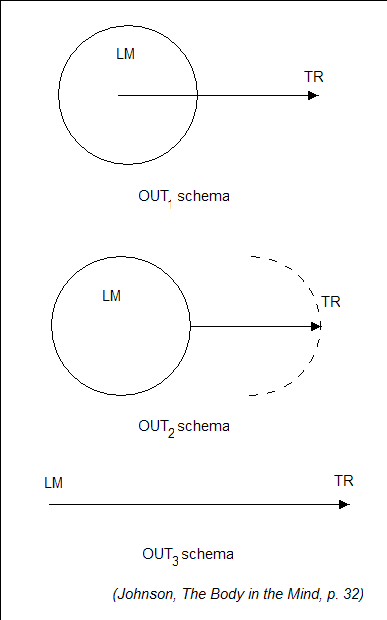
Figure 2 - containment image schema (as applied to the English word out)

Image schemas are dynamic embodied patterns—they take place in and through time. Moreover, they are multi-modal patterns of experience, not simply visual. For instance, consider how the dynamic nature of the containment schema is reflected in the various spatial senses of the English word out. Out may be used in cases where a clearly defined trajector (TR) leaves a spatially bounded landmark (LM), as in:

(1a) John went out of the room.
(1b) Mary got out of the car.
(1c) Spot jumped out of the pen.

In the most prototypical of such cases the landmark is a clearly defined container. However, out may also be used to indicate those cases where the trajector is a mass that spreads out, effectively expanding the area of the containing landmark:

(2a) She poured out the beans.
(2b) Roll out the carpet.
(2c) Send out the troops.

Finally, out is also often used to describe motion along a linear path where the containing landmark is implied and not defined at all:

(3) The train started out for Chicago.

Experientially basic and primarily spatial image schemas such as the Containment schema and its derivatives the Out schemas lend their logic to non-spatial situations. For example, one may metaphorically use the term out to describe non-spatial experiences:

(4) Leave out that big log when you stack the firewood. (Schema used directly and non-metaphorically.)
(4a) I don't want to leave any relevant data out of my argument. (Schema metaphorically projected onto argumentation.)
(4b) Tell me your story again, and don't leave out any details. (Schema metaphorically projected onto story-telling.)
(4c) She finally came out of her depression. (Schema metaphorically projected onto emotional life.)

Johnson argues that more abstract reasoning is shaped by such underlying spatial patterns. For example, he notes that the logic of containment is not just a matter of being in or out of the container. For example, if someone is in a deep depression, we know it is likely to be a long time before they are well. The deeper the trajector is in the container, the longer it will take for the trajector to get out of it. Similarly, Johnson argues that transitivity and the law of the excluded middle in logic are underlaid by preconceptual embodied experiences of the Containment schema.

== Lakoff: Image schemas in Brugman's The story of Over ==
In case study two of his book Women, Fire and Dangerous Things, Lakoff re-presented the analysis of the English word over done by Claudia Brugman in her (1981) master's thesis. Similar to the analysis of out given by Johnson, Lakoff argued that there were six basic spatial schemas for the English word over. Moreover, Lakoff gave a detailed accounting of how these schemas were interrelated in terms of what he called a radial category structure. For example, these six schemas could be both further specified by other spatial schemas such as whether the trajector was in contact with the landmark or not (as in the plane flew over the mountain vs. he climbed over the mountain). Furthermore, Lakoff identified a group of "transformational" image schemata such as rotational schemas and path to object mass, as in Spider-Man climbed all over the wall. This analysis raised profound questions about how image schemas could be grouped, transformed, and how sequences of image schemas could be chained together in language, mind, and brain.

== Relationships to similar theories ==
Johnson indicates that his analysis of out drew upon a 1981 doctoral dissertation by Susan Lindner in linguistics at UCSD under Ronald Langacker, and more generally by the theory of cognitive grammar put forth by him. For the force group of image schemas Johnson also drew on an early version of the force dynamic schemas put forth by Len Talmy, as used by linguists such as Eve Sweetser. Other influences include Max Wertheimer's gestalt structure theory and Kant's account of schemas in categorization, as well as studies in experimental psychology on the mental rotation of images.

In addition to the dissertation on over by Brugman, Lakoff's use of image schema theory also drew extensively on Talmy and Langacker's theories of spatial relations terms. Other theories making use of similar conceptual primitives to capture meaning include Jean M. Mandler's spatial primitives, Anna Wierzbicka's semantic primes, Leonard Talmy's conceptual primitives, Roger Schank conceptual dependency theory and Andrea A. diSessa's phenomenological primitives (p-prims).

Image schemas have also been proposed to be descriptors of Gibsonian affordances. An object like a cup affords the image schema Containment to liquids and an abstract concept like transportation offer the affordance of moving something from one point to another as an image-schematic combination of Source-Path-Goal and Containment (alternatively Support).

== Formal specification of image schemas and role in artificial intelligence ==
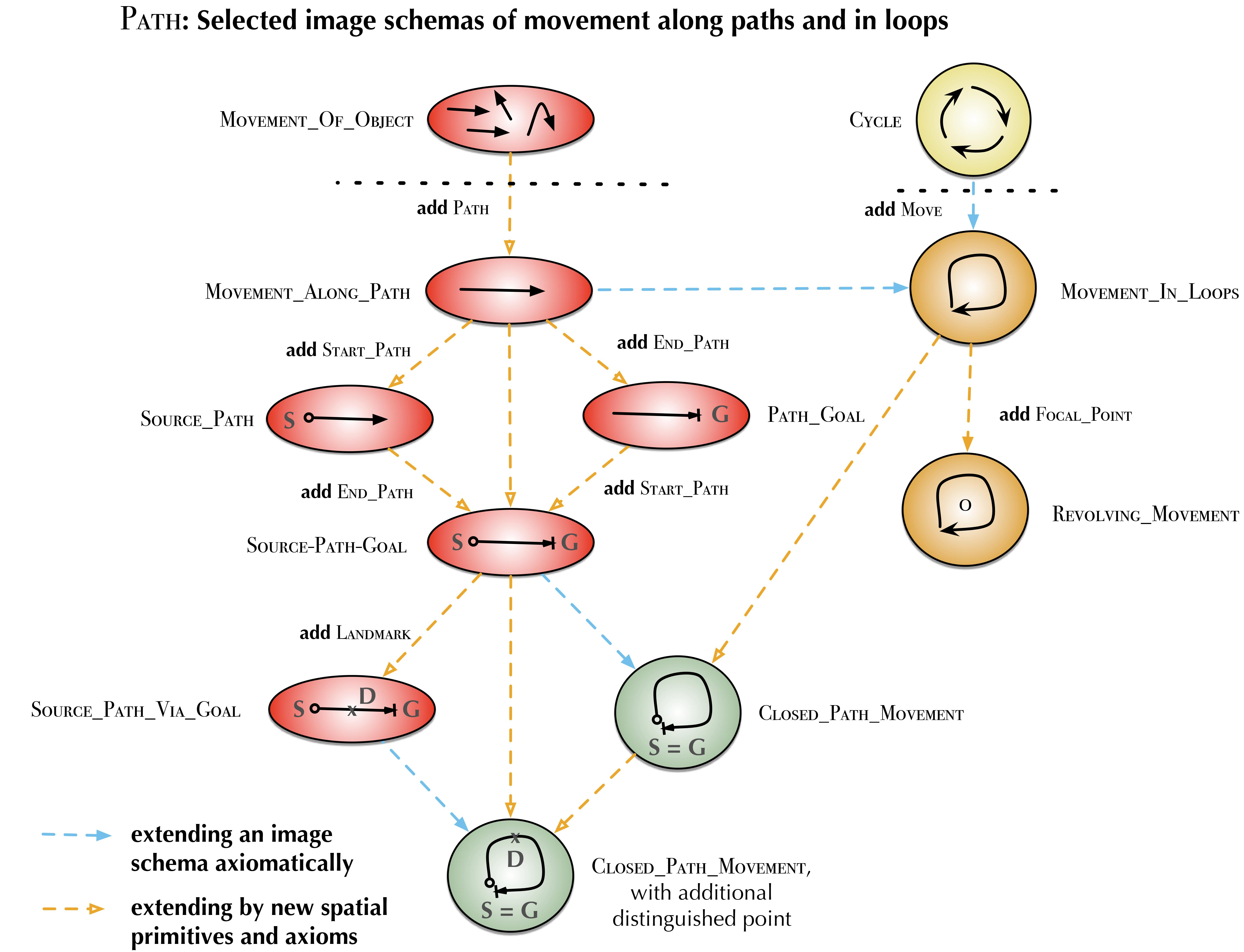
Some members of the Source-Path-Goal family.

While originally a theory for cognitive linguistics, the theory of image schemas and the underlying ideas behind embodied cognition have become of increased interest in artificial intelligence and cognitive robotics to help solve issues with natural language comprehension and the application of affordances. The research on formal accounts (e.g.) of these abstract patterns date back several decades and has been proposed as a way to deal with geographical information science, natural language comprehension, automatic ontology generation and computational conceptual blending.

As a direct relation to embodied cognition, and more specifically embodied construction grammar, formal approaches to image schemas often limit the research area by looking at image schemas exclusively as spatiotemporal relationships. This provides a feasible foundation for knowledge representation to represent each individual image schema as well as their interconnection as relationships in a 3D space. One formal language to describe them is the ISL (Image Schema Language), a logic language combined by different formal calculi and first-order logic that builds on creating hierarchical families of logical micro-theories that is able to represent different degrees of specification of the image schemas.

In artificial intelligence, image schemas are also used as an inspiration to advance natural language comprehension of metaphors, conceptual blending and creative language use. This is extended to also include non-linguistic reasoning such as commonsense reasoning (e.g. see Davis' Egg cracking problem and the approach made to describe it image-schematically) and the formal structure of events prototypical as some of the biggest challenges in AI.

== Lists of image schemas ==
While Johnson provided an initial list of image schemas in The Body in the Mind (p. 126), his diagrams for them are scattered throughout his book and he only diagrammed a portion of those image schemas he listed. In his work, Lakoff also used several additional schemas.

=== Schemas discussed by Johnson ===
Spatial motion group

Containment
Path
Source-Path-Goal
Blockage
Center-Periphery
Cycle
Cyclic Climax

Force Group

Compulsion
Counterforce
Diversion
Removal of Restraint
Enablement
Attraction
Link
Scale

Balance Group

Axis Balance
Point Balance
Twin-Pan Balance
Equilibrium

=== Schemas listed, but not discussed, by Johnson ===
Contact
Surface
Full-Empty
Merging
Matching
Near-Far
Mass-Count
Iteration
Object
Splitting
Part-Whole
Superimposition
Process
Collection

=== Additional schemas discussed by Lakoff ===
Transformational group

Linear path from moving object (one-dimensional trajector)
Path to endpoint (endpoint focus)
Path to object mass (path covering)
Multiplex to mass (possibly the same as Johnson's undefined Mass-Count)
Reflexive (both part-whole and temporally different reflexives)
Rotation

Spatial group

Above
Across
Covering
Contact
Vertical Orientation
Length (extended trajector)

=== Schemas proposed and discussed by others ===
Rough-smooth/Bumpy-smooth (Rohrer; Johnson and Rohrer)
Straight (Cienki)

=== Mandler and Canovas' image schema hierarchy ===
1. Spatial primitives. The first building blocks that allow us to understand what we perceive: PATH, CONTAINER, THING, CONTACT, etc.
2. Image schemas. Representations of simple spatial events using the primitives: PATH TO THING, THING INTO CONTAINER, etc.
3. Schematic integrations. The first conceptual representations to include non-spatial elements, by projecting feelings or non-spatial perceptions to blends structured by image schema

== See also ==
- Affordances
- Artificial consciousness
- Cognitive architecture
- Commonsense reasoning
- Conceptual space
- Construction grammar
- Embodied philosophy
- Schema (psychology)
