= Mental space =

Theoretical construct corresponding to a possible world

The mental space is a theoretical construct proposed by Gilles Fauconnier corresponding to possible worlds in truth-conditional semantics. The main difference between a mental space and a possible world is that a mental space does not contain a faithful representation of reality, but an idealized cognitive model. Building of mental spaces and establishment of mappings between those mental spaces are the two main processes involved in construction of meaning. It is one of the basic components in Gilles Fauconnier and Mark Turner's blending theory, a theory within cognitive semantics.

== Base space and built space ==
Base space, also known as reality space, presents the interlocutors' shared knowledge of the real world. Space builders are elements within a sentence that establish spaces distinct from, yet related to the base space constructed. Space builders can be expressions like prepositional phrases, adverbs, connectives, and subject-verb combinations that are followed by an embedded sentence. They require hearers to establish scenarios beyond the present point of time. A built space depicts a situation that only holds true for that space itself, but may or may not be true in reality. The base space and built spaces are occupied by elements that map onto each other. These elements include categories that may refer to specific entities in those categories. According to Fauconnier's Access Principle, specific entities of a category in a space can be described by its counterpart category in another space even if it differs from the specific entity in the other space. An example of a built space can be seen in the example " Mary wants to buy a book". In this case, the built space is not that of reality, but Mary's desire space. Though the book in reality space refers to any book in general, it can still be used to describe the book in Mary's desire space, which may or may not be a specific book.

== Foundation and expansion space ==
‘if A then B’ sentences create another two spaces called foundation space and expansion space in addition to the base space. The foundation space is a hypothetical space relative to the base space set up by the space builder "if". The expansion space is set up by the space builder "then". If the conditions in the foundation space hold, the expansion space follows.

== See also ==
- Semiotics – Study of signs
