= Usage-based models of language =

Linguistics approach / theory

Usage-based models of language are linguistic approaches within a broader functional or cognitive framework that emerged in the late 1980s. These models assume a profound relationship between linguistic structure and usage.

== History ==
The term "usage-based" was coined by Ronald Langacker in 1987. Usage-based models of language have become a significant trend in linguistics since the early 2000s. Influential proponents of usage-based linguistics include Michael Tomasello, Joan Bybee and Morten Christiansen.

=== Difference from formal models ===
Usage-based models challenge the dominant focus of 20th- century linguistics on formalism-generativism, which considers language an isolated system removed from its use in human interaction and cognition. Instead, usage-based models propose that linguistic information is expressed via context-sensitive mental processing and mental representations, which can succinctly account for the complexity of actual language use at all levels (phonetics and phonology, morphology and syntax, pragmatics and semantics). Broadly speaking, a usage-based model of language accounts for language acquisition and processing, synchronic and diachronic patterns, and both low-level and high-level structure in language by looking at actual language use.

Together with related approaches, such as construction grammar, emergent grammar, and language as a complex adaptive system, usage-based linguistics belongs to the wider framework of evolutionary linguistics. It studies the lifespan of linguistic units (e.g. words, suffixes), arguing that they can survive language change through frequent usage or by participating in usage-based generalizations if their syntactic, semantic or pragmatic features overlap with other similar constructions. There is disagreement as to whether the approach is different from memetics or essentially the same.

== Disciplinary roots ==
West coast cognitive functionalism

West Coast cognitive functionalism (WCCF) played a major role in the creation of the usage-based enterprise. Firstly, a crucial point in WCCF was Eleanor Rosch’s paper on semantic categories in human cognition, which studied fuzzy semantic categories with central and peripheral concepts. Subsequently, Robin Lakoff (1987) applied these concepts to linguistic studies. For usage-based models of language, these discoveries legitimized interest in the peripheral phenomena and inspired the examination of the ontological status of the rules themselves. Secondly, WCCF focuses on the effects of social/ textual context and cognitive processes on human thought, instead of established systems and representations, which motivated the study of external sources in usage-based language research. For example, in analyzing the differences between the grammatical notions of subject vs. topic, Li and Thompson (1976), found that the repetition of certain topics by a speech community resulted in the surfacing and crystallization of formal properties into syntactic entities, namely the subject. This notion of syntax and morphology being an outcome of pragmatic and cognitive factors was influential in the development of usage-based models. Thirdly, the WCCF methodology of linguistic typology is similarly practised in usage-based models, in collecting data from real communicative contexts and analyzing them for typological regularities. This highlights an important aspect of usage-based research, the study of methods for the integration of synchrony and diachrony.

Langacker’s Cognitive Grammar

The term ‘usage-based’ was coined by Ronald Langacker in 1987, while doing research on Cognitive Grammar. Langacker identified commonly recurring linguistic patterns (patterns such as those associated with Wh- fronting, subject-verb agreement, the use of present participles, etc.) and represented these supposed rule-governed behaviours on a hierarchical structure. The Cognitive Grammar model represented grammar, semantics and lexicon as associated processes that were laid on a continuum, which provided a theoretical framework that was significant in studying the usage-based conception of language. Consequently, a usage-based model accounts for these rule-governed language behaviours by providing a representational scheme that is entirely instance-based, and able to recognize and uniquely represent each familiar pattern, which occurs with varying strengths at different instances. His usage-based model draws on the cognitive psychology of schemata, which are flexible hierarchical structures that are able to accommodate the complexity of mental stimuli. Similarly, as humans perceive linguistic abstractions as multilayered, ranging from patterns that occur across whole utterances to those that occur in phonetic material, the usage-based model acknowledges the differing levels of granularity in speakers’ knowledge of their language. Langacker's work emphasizes that both abstract structure and instance-based detail are contained in language, differing in granularity but not in basic principles.

Bybee's Dynamic Usage-based framework

Bybee’s work was influential in the creation of usage-based models of language. Bybee’s model makes predictions about and explains synchronic, diachronic and typological patterns within languages, such as which variants will occur in which contexts, what forms they will take, and what their diachronic consequences will be. Using the linguistic phenomenon of splits (when a word starts to show subtle polysemy, and morphological possibilities for the originally single form ensue), Bybee shows that even irreducibly irregular word-forms are non-arbitrary when the context they occur in is taken into consideration in the very representation of morphology. She also shows that even seemingly regular allomorphy is context-sensitive. The phenomenon of splits also aligns with the idea that linguistic forms cannot be studied as isolated entities, but rather in relation to the strength of their attachment to other entities.

=== Schmid's Entrenchment-and-Conventionalization model ===
Hans-Jörg Schmid’s "Entrenchment-and-Conventionalization" Model offers a comprehensive summary of usage-based thinking. With reference to many sub-disciplines and concepts in linguistics, he shows how usage mediates between entrenchment, the establishment of linguistic habits in individuals via repetition and associations, and conventionalization, a continuous feedback cycle which builds shared collective linguistic knowledge. All three components connect linguistic utterance types with their respective situative settings and extralinguistic associations.

== Frequency explanation ==
Advocates of usage-based linguistics, including Joan Bybee and Martin Haspelmath, argue that statistics of language usage depend on frequency. For instance, it is argued that the English verb tell always has two arguments ('tell something to someone') unlike the verb sell, which more frequently only has a direct object in actual language usage ('sell something'). It is hypothesized that such differences in the recurrence of the indirect object depend on statistical learning based on the language usage encountered by the individual. Jae Jung Song argues that the frequency explanation is circular—certain patterns are often used by people because they are frequent—and that the explanation of frequency issues must be found outside themselves.

== Constructions: Form-meaning pairings ==
Constructions have direct pairing of form to meaning without intermediate structures, making them appropriate for usage-based models. The usage-based model adopts constructions as the basic unit of form-meaning correspondence. A construction is commonly regarded as a conventionalized string of words. A key feature of a grammar based on constructions is that it can reflect the deep intertwining of lexical items and grammatical structure.

From a grammarian perspective, constructions are groupings of words with idiosyncratic behaviour to a certain extent. They mostly take on an unpredictable meaning or pragmatic effect, or are formally special. From a broader perspective, constructions can also be seen as processing units or chunks, such as sequences of words (or morphemes) which have been used often enough to be accessed together. This implies that common word sequences are sometimes constructions even if they do not have idiosyncrasies of meaning or form. Additionally, chunks or conventionalized sequences tend to develop special pragmatic implications that can lead to special meaning over time. They can also develop idiosyncrasies of form in a variety of ways.

- It drives me crazy.
- The death of his wife the following year drove him mad.
- This room drives me up the wall.

Adjectives shown here include crazy, mad, and up the wall, which are semantically related to the word drive. Exemplar models propose that memory for linguistic experience is similar to memory for other types of experience. Every token of linguistic experience impacts cognitive representation, and when stored representations are accessed, the representations change. Additionally, memory storage can store detailed information about processed tokens during linguistic experience, including their form and the contexts in which they were used. In this model, general categories and grammar units can emerge from linguistic experiences stored in memory, as exemplars are categorized by similarity to each other. Contiguous experiences such as meaning and acoustic shape are also recorded as linked to each other.

Constructions as chunks

By these means, repeated sequences become more fluent. Within a chunk, sequential links are graded in strength based on the frequency of the chunk or perhaps the transitions between the elements of a chunk. A construction is a chunk even though it may contain schematic slots; that is, the elements of a chunk can be interrupted.

Memory storage requires links to connect idiomatic phrases together. In chunking, repeated sequences are represented together as units which can be accessed directly. Through this, repeated sequences become more fluent. Sequential links are graded in strength based on the frequency of the chunk or transitions between elements within a chunk. Additionally, the individual elements of a chunk can link to elements in other contexts. The example of ‘drive someone crazy’ forms a chunk; however, the items that compose it are not analyzable individually as words that occur elsewhere in cognitive representation. As chunks are used more frequently, words can lose their associations with exemplars of the same word. This is known as de-categorialization.

== See also ==
- Applied linguistics
- Construction grammar
- Evolutionary linguistics
- Linguistic typology
- Ronald Langacker
