= Frame semantics (linguistics) =

Linguistic theory

Frame semantics is a theory of linguistic meaning developed by Charles J. Fillmore that extends his earlier case grammar. It relates linguistic semantics to encyclopedic knowledge. The basic idea is that one cannot understand the meaning of a single word without access to all the essential knowledge that relates to that word. For example, one would not be able to understand the word "sell" without knowing anything about the situation of commercial transfer, which also involves, among other things, a seller, a buyer, goods, money, the relation between the money and the goods, the relations between the seller and the goods and the money, the relation between the buyer and the goods and the money and so on. Thus, a word activates, or evokes, a frame of semantic knowledge relating to the specific concept to which it refers (or highlights, in frame semantic terminology).

The idea of the encyclopedic organisation of knowledge itself is old and was discussed by Age of Enlightenment philosophers such as Denis Diderot and Giambattista Vico. Fillmore and other evolutionary and cognitive linguists like John Haiman and Adele Goldberg, however, make an argument against generative grammar and truth-conditional semantics. As is elementary for Lakoffian–Langackerian Cognitive Linguistics, it is claimed that knowledge of language is no different from other types of knowledge; therefore there is no grammar in the traditional sense, and language is not an independent cognitive function. Instead, the spreading and survival of linguistic units is directly comparable to that of other types of units of cultural evolution, like in memetics and other cultural replicator theories.

== Use in cognitive linguistics and construction grammar ==
The theory applies the notion of a semantic frame also used in artificial intelligence, which is a collection of facts that specify "characteristic features, attributes, and functions of a denotatum, and its characteristic interactions with things necessarily or typically associated with it." A semantic frame can also be defined as a coherent structure of related concepts that are related such that without knowledge of all of them, one does not have complete knowledge of any one; they are in that sense types of gestalt. Frames are based on recurring experiences, therefore the commercial transaction frame is based on recurring experiences of commercial transactions.

Words not only highlight individual concepts, but also specify a certain perspective from which the frame is viewed. For example "sell" views the situation from the perspective of the seller and "buy" from the perspective of the buyer. This, according to Fillmore, explains the observed asymmetries in many lexical relations.

While originally only being applied to lexemes, frame semantics has now been expanded to grammatical constructions and other larger and more complex linguistic units and has more or less been integrated into construction grammar as the main semantic principle. Semantic frames are also becoming used in information modeling, for example in Gellish, especially in the form of 'definition models' and 'knowledge models'.

Frame semantics has much in common with the semantic principle of profiling from Ronald W. Langacker's cognitive grammar.

The concept of frames has been several times considered in philosophy and psycholinguistics, namely supported by Lawrence W. Barsalou, and more recently by Sebastian Löbner. They are viewed as a cognitive representation of the real world. From a computational linguistics viewpoint, there are semantic models of a sentence.

== Applications ==
Google originally started a frame semantic parser project that aims to parse the information on Wikipedia and transfer it into Wikidata by coming up with relevant relations using artificial intelligence.

== See also ==
- Conceptual space
- Figurative system of human knowledge
- FrameNet
- Formal semantics (natural language)
- Frame language
- Metaphorical framing
- Prototype theory
- Universal Darwinism
