= Dirk Geeraerts =

Dirk Geeraerts (born 24 October 1955) is a Belgian linguist. He is professor emeritus of theoretical linguistics at the University of Leuven, Belgium. He is the founder of the research unit Quantitative Lexicology and Variational Linguistics (QLVL). His main research interests involve the overlapping fields of lexical semantics, lexicology, and lexicography, with a theoretical focus on cognitive semantics. His involvement with cognitive linguistics dates from the 1980s, when in his PhD thesis he was one of the first in Europe to explore the possibilities of a prototype-theoretical model of categorization. As the founder of the journal Cognitive Linguistics and as the editor (with Hubert Cuyckens) of the Oxford Handbook of Cognitive Linguistics, he played an instrumental role in the international expansion of cognitive linguistics. Geeraerts is one of the outspoken advocates of the implementation of empirical methodologies, such as corpus linguistics in cognitive linguistic research. He also argues for the involvement of more pragmatic elements such as contextual factors, lectal variation, and language history that influence the construal of word meanings and the choice of lexical items for concepts.

== Books ==
His publications include the following monographs:

- D. Geeraerts, Paradigm and Paradox (1985). Leuven: Leuven University Press.
- D. Geeraerts, Woordbetekenis (1986). Leuven: Acco.
- D. Geeraerts, Wat er in een woord zit (1989) Leuven: Peeters.
- D. Geeraerts, S. Grondelaers & P. Bakema, The Structure of Lexical Variation (1994). Berlin: Mouton de Gruyter.
- D. Geeraerts, Diachronic Prototype Semantics (1997). Oxford: OUP.
- D. Geeraerts, S. Grondelaers & D. Speelman, Convergentie en divergentie in de Nederlandse woordenschat (2000). Amsterdam: Meertens.
- D. Geeraerts, Words and Other Wonders. Papers on Lexical and Semantic Topics (2006). Berlin: Mouton de Gruyter.
- D. Geeraerts, Theories of Lexical Semantics (2010). Oxford: OUP.
- D. Geeraerts, Conceptual Structure and Conceptual Variation (2017). Shanghai: Foreign Language Education Press.
- D. Geeraerts, Ten Lectures on Cognitive Sociolinguistics (2018). Leiden: Brill.
- D. Geeraerts, D. Speelman, K. Heylen, M. Montes, S. De Pascale, K. Franco, M. Lang (2024). Lexical Variation and Change. A Distributional Semantic Approach . Oxford: OUP.

== Honors ==
He is a member of the Koninklijke Academie voor Nederlandse Taal en Letteren (KANTL) and the Academia Europaea. His 60th birthday was celebrated by the publication of Change of Paradigms-New Paradoxes (J. Daems et al. 2015, De Gruyter Mouton). His retirement saw the publication of a special issue of the journal Nederlandse Taalkunde (2022:2), and another Festschrift: G. Kristiansen et al. 2021, Cognitive Sociolinguistics Revisited (De Gruyter Mouton).
