= Polish Cognitive Linguistics Association =

Polish Cognitive Linguistics Association (PCLA) is a non-profit science organization that sponsors conferences and publications in the field of Cognitive linguistics and is an affiliate of International Cognitive Linguistics Association.

In 2015 PCLA had 97 members representing various Polish and international academic institutions. Among the honorary members of PCLA is Ronald Langacker, one of the pioneers of cognitive linguistics.
