= Eve Sweetser =

Professor of linguistics

Eve Eliot Sweetser is a professor of linguistics at the University of California, Berkeley. She received her Ph.D. in Linguistics from UC Berkeley in 1984, and has been a member of the Berkeley faculty since that time. She has served as Director of Berkeley's undergraduate Cognitive Science Program and is Director of the Celtic Studies Program.

Sweetser has published articles on topics including modality, polysemy, metaphor, conditional constructions, grammatical meaning, performativity, gesture, and Medieval Welsh poetics. Some of her more accessible work focuses on gesture, but her other research interests include historical linguistics, semantics, metaphor and iconicity, subjectivity and viewpoint, and the Celtic language family.

== Partial bibliography ==
- (1990) From etymology to pragmatics: metaphorical and cultural aspects of semantic structure Eve Sweetser. Cambridge [England]; New York: Cambridge University Press.
- (1991) From Etymology to Pragmatics: Metaphorical and Cultural Aspects of Semantic Structure. Eve E. Sweetser. Cambridge: Cambridge University Press, Cambridge Studies in Linguistics, reprint edition. ISBN 0-521-42442-9.
- (1996a) Spaces, Worlds, and Grammar. Gilles Fauconnier & Eve Sweetser, editors. Chicago & London: The University of Chicago Press. ISBN 0-226-23924-1 (paperback).
- (1996b) "Changes in figures and changes in grounds: A note on change predicates, mental spaces, and scalar norms." Cognitive Studies: Bulletin of the Japanese Cognitive Science Society, 3:3 (Sept. 1996 – Special Issue on Cognitive Linguistics), pp. 75–86. (Japanese journal title: Ninchi Kagaku – Tokushu: Ninchi Gengogaku)
- (1997a) A Celtic florilegium: studies in memory of Brendan O Hehir edited by Kathryn A. Klar, Eve E. Sweetser, and Claire Thomas.
- (1997b) Lexical and syntactical constructions and the construction of meaning edited by Marjolijn Verspoor, Kee Dong Lee, Eve Sweetser.
- (2005) Mental spaces in grammar: conditional constructions Barbara Dancygier and Eve Sweetser.
- (2006a) With the Future Behind Them: Convergent Evidence From Aymara Language and Gesture in the Crosslinguistic Comparison of Spatial Construals of Time Rafael E. Núñez, Eve Sweetser. Cognitive Science 30: 1–49.
- (2006b) "Looking at space to study mental spaces: Co-speech gesture as a crucial data source in cognitive linguistics". In Monica Gonzalez-Marquez, Irene Mittleberg, Seana Coulson and Michael Spivey (eds.), Methods in Cognitive Linguistics. Amsterdam: John Benjamins. 203–226.
- (2006c) "Putting the 'same' meaning together from different pieces". In S. Marmaridou and K. Nikiforidou (eds.), Reviewing Linguistic Thought: Perspectives into the 21st Century. Berlin: Mouton de Gruyter.
- (2006d) "Negative spaces: Levels of negation and kinds of spaces". In Stéphanie Bonnefille & Sébastien Salbayre (eds.), Proceedings of the conference "Negation: Form, figure of speech, conceptualization". Publication du groupe de recherches Anglo-américaines de l'Université de Tours. Tours: Publications universitaires François Rabelais.
- (2006e) "Personal and interpersonal gesture spaces: Functional contrasts in language and gesture". In A. Tyler, Y. Kim, and M. Takada (Eds.), Language in the Context of Use: Cognitive and Discourse Approaches to Language and Language Learning. Berlin: Mouton de Gruyter.
- (2008) Style and Patterns of Blending. Sweetser, Eve. Style and Patterns of Blending (October 19, 2008). 9th Conference on Conceptual Structure, Discourse, and Language (CSDL9). Available at SSRN: http://ssrn.com/abstract=1293687
- (2009a) Myriam Bouveret and Eve Sweetser. 'Multi-frame semantics, metaphoric extensions and grammar". BLS 35.
- (2009b) Karen Sullivan and Eve Sweetser. 2009. "Is 'Generic is Specific' a Metaphor?" in Fey Parrill, Vera Tobin and Mark Turner (eds.), Meaning, Form and Body. (Selected papers from the 2008 CSDL meeting). Stanford CA: CSLI Publications.
- (2009c) "What does it mean to compare Language and Gesture? Modalities and Contrasts". In Jiansheng Guo et al. (eds.), Crosslinguistic approaches to the psychology of language: Studies in the tradition of Dan Isaac Slobin. New York: Psychology Press. 357–366.
