= Cognitive approaches to grammar =

Cognitive approaches to grammar are theories of grammar that relate grammar to mental processes and structures in human cognition. While Chomsky's theories of generative grammar are the most influential in most areas of linguistics, other theories also deal with the cognitive aspects of grammar.

The approach of Noam Chomsky and his fellow generative grammarians is that of an autonomous mental faculty that it is governed by mental processes operating on mental representations of different kinds of symbols that apply only within this faculty.

Another cognitive approach to grammar is that which is proposed by proponents of cognitive linguistics, which holds that grammar is not an autonomous mental faculty with processes of its own, but that it is intertwined with all other cognitive processes and structures. The basic claim here is that grammar is conceptualization. Some of the theories that fall within this paradigm are construction grammar, cognitive grammar, and word grammar.
