= Anankastic =

Anankastic may refer to:

- Anankastic conditional, a grammatical construction
- Obsessive-compulsive personality disorder, also called "anankastic personality disorder"
- Perfectionism (psychology), sometimes called anakastia in clinical settings
