= Hans-Jörg Schmid =

German linguist

- Occupation: Linguist

Academic background
- Education: LMU Munich; Technical University of Munich; University of Exeter

Academic work
- Discipline: Linguistics
- Institutions: LMU Munich

Hans-Jörg Schmid is a German linguist. He is a professor at LMU Munich, where he has held the Chair of Modern English Linguistics since 2005. He has made contributions to cognitive linguistics, lexical semantics, word-formation, pragmatics and linguistic theory.

== Education ==
Schmid studied English and Physical Education at LMU Munich and Technical University of Munich. In 1987, he graduated with a teacher diploma, but returned to LMU Munich to complete a PhD in English Linguistics, Psycholinguistics and English Literature under the supervision of Leonhard Lipka in 1992. In 1998, he completed his second doctorate (Habilitation) also at LMU Munich.

== Career ==
Schmid held posts at TU Dresden and Ruhr University Bochum and became Chair in English Linguistics at University of Bayreuth from 2000 to 2005. Since 2005, he has held the Chair of Modern English Linguistics at LMU Munich.

== Editorial roles ==
Schmid served as Editor of the journal Pragmatics & Cognition from 2017 to 2021. Since January 2025, he has served as Editor-in-Chief of the journal Cognitive Linguistics, published by De Gruyter Brill.

== Main contributions ==
Together with Friedrich Ungerer, Schmid published the first introduction to the field of Cognitive Linguistics (Longman, 1996) world-wide, which was translated into Chinese, Japanese and Korean. A second edition followed in 2006.

In 2000, he introduced the notion of shell nouns (e.g. fact, idea, problem), defined as a set of abstract nouns which function as conceptual shells for complex propositional content retrievable from the context. The notion has inspired research in various fields of applied and theoretical linguistics and on numerous languages.

From the 2010s onwards, he has developed the Entrenchment-and-Conventionalization Model, a usage-based, complex-adaptive model of language which integrates cognitive, pragmatic and sociolinguistic aspects to explain language structure, linguistic variation and language change.

== Publications ==
Schmid has published six monographs, (co-)edited seven volumes and published more the 70 articles in journals and edited volumes.
