= Seana Coulson =

American cognitive scientist

- Occupation: Professor of Cognitive Science
- Awards: Innovative Research Grant (2006-2007, 2014-2015, 2020-2021, 2022-2023) 2009 NSF Perception, Action & Cognition 2002 Hellman Fellowship

Academic background
- Education: Wellesley College (B.A) University of California, San Diego (M.S, Ph.D)

Academic work
- Institutions: University of California, San Diego

Seana Coulson is a cognitive scientist known for her research on the neurobiology of language and studies of how meaning is constructed in human language, including experimental pragmatics, concepts, semantics, and metaphors. She is a professor in the Cognitive Science department at University of California, San Diego, where her Brain and Cognition Laboratory focuses on the cognitive neuroscience of language and reasoning.

Coulson is best known for her research involving human use of conceptual blending, an unconscious process in human language that combines unrelated concepts into a single consistent idea.

== Biography and awards ==
Coulson earned her B.A. in philosophy at Wellesley College in 1988, graduating Magna Cum Laude. She worked as a Production Editor for Garland Publishing in New York City from 1988 to 1989. She then worked as a Research Assistant from 1989 to 1990 in the Department of Psychology at Hunter College, where she collaborated with Virginia Valian on research involving the use of anchor points in language learning.

In 1990, she began her graduate education in Cognitive Science at University of California, San Diego, earning her M.S. in 1992 and Ph.D. in 1997. Her dissertation, Semantic Leaps: Frame Shifting and Conceptual Blending, was published as a monograph in 2001, and is her most cited work.

In 1999, she returned to University of California, San Diego as an assistant professor in the Cognitive Science department. In 2002, she earned a University of California Hellman Fellowship award, a fellowship for junior faculty across the University of California system. Her award was for her work titled "Language Comprehension and the Space Structuring Model: Electrophysiological Investigations". In June 2004, Coulson and her graduate student, Christopher Lovett, were featured in an article for magazine The Scientist. The article, "Humor and Handedness", discussed her use of jokes as a high-level language input to investigate brain response differences between left- and right-handed individuals.

In 2009, Coulson was awarded an NSF grant from the Division of Behavioral and Cognitive Science. Her abstract, "Understanding Multi-Modal Discourse: Cognitive Resources and Speech-Gesture Integration", was awarded under the Perception, Action & Cognition program. She was promoted to Full Professor at UCSD in 2012.

Coulson has earned the Innovative Research Grant, a yearly grant from The Kavli Institute for Brain and Mind, four times. For 2006-2007, she collaborated on two projects titled "Overcoming overlearning" and "Lesion-symptom mapping and pragmatic language comprehension". For 2014–2015, she collaborated on a project titled "A Novel Test of the Grounded Cognition Hypothesis in Grapheme-Color Synesthetes". For 2020–2021, she collaborated on two projects titled "Investigating the Role of Rhythmic Cortical Activity in Processing of Hierarchically Organized Linguistic and Non-linguistic Sequences in Humans and Rats" and "Auditory deviance detection in single cells, local field potentials, and extracranial EEG". Most recently, Coulson and other UCSD Cognitive Science department members Ana Chkaidze, Anastasia Kiyonga, and Lera Boroditsky were awarded an Innovative Research Grant for 2022-2023. Their proposed collaborative project was titled "What are thoughts made of? Dusting neural fingerprints of internal representations using phenomenology and information-based neuroimaging".

== Research ==
Coulson's research program was influenced by French linguist Gilles Fauconnier, one of the founders of the theory of conceptual blending. She credits her publication of Semantic Leaps (2001) as a product of 10 years of conversations with Fauconnier. Coulson continues to publish research expanding upon the framework of conceptual blending through use of measuring event-related potential's (ERPs) with electroencephalography (EEG). Through this methodology, Coulson uses psycho-linguistically grounded stimuli to reveal stereotyped electrophysiological responses. Coulson has used ERP methods to investigate many linguistic concepts and has published on topics such as iconic gestures, joke comprehension, and understanding irony.

Several of Coulson's publications using ERP involve investigating the role of the N400, an observed response in EEG signals where negativity peaks after about 400 milliseconds following a stimulus onset, often involved in picture recognition or word prediction. Coulson and co-authors have found that the amplitude of N400 responses may be modulated by natural language stimuli. For example, N400 responses were found to be smaller when hearing a joke compared to a non-funny control phrase, and larger when interpreting a metaphor as compared to the literal meaning of a word.

Coulson has also worked on research investigating synaethesia in adults. Her work has advanced how scientists understand perceptual organization syntesthetes, including the contextual congruity and potential bi-directionality of colors and numbers.

== Representative bibliography ==
=== Books ===
- Coulson, S. (2001). Semantic leaps: frame-shifting and conceptual blending in meaning construction. United Kingdom: Cambridge University Press.
- Coulson, S. & Lewandowska-Tomaszczyk, B. (Eds.) (2005). The Literal and the Nonliteral in Language and Thought. Peter Lang.
- Gonzalez-Marquez, M, Mittelberg, I, Coulson, S, and Spivey, M. (Eds.) (2007). Methods in Cognitive Linguistics. John Benjamins.

=== Articles ===
- Coulson, S., King, J. W., & Kutas, M. (1998). Expect the unexpected: Event-related brain response to morphosyntactic violations. Language and Cognitive Processes, 13(1), 21–58, doi:10.1080/016909698386582
- Coulson, S., & Oakley, T. (2005). Blending and coded meaning: Literal and figurative meaning in cognitive semantics. Journal of Pragmatics, 37(10), 1510–1536. doi:10.1016/j.pragma.2004.09.010
- Coulson, S., & Van Petten, C. (2002). Conceptual integration and metaphor: An event-related potential study. Memory & Cognition, 30(6), 958–968. doi:10.3758/BF03195780
- Davis, J. D., Winkielman, P., & Coulson, S. (2017). Sensorimotor simulation and emotion processing: Impairing facial action increases semantic retrieval demands. Cognitive, Affective, & Behavioral Neuroscience, 17(3), 652–664. doi:10.3758/s13415-017-0503-2
- Van Petten, C., Coulson, S., Rubin, S., Plante, E., & Parks, M. (1999). Time course of word identification and semantic integration in spoken language. Journal of Experimental Psychology: Learning, Memory, and Cognition, 25(2), 394–417. doi:10.1037/0278-7393.25.2.394
