= CXG =

CXG may refer to:

- Construction grammar (CxG), a family of theories in the field of cognitive and evolutionary linguistics
- Crazy Ex-Girlfriend, a 2015 American romantic musical comedy-drama television series
