= Cognitive phonology =

Cognitive phonology is usually thought of as the study of the 'sound systems' of languages. It is an attempt to classify various correspondences between morphemes and phonetic sequences and is a part of cognitive grammar. One attractive feature of cognitive phonology is that other aspects of grammar are directly accessible due to its subordinate relationship with cognitive grammar; thus making relationships between phonology and various aspects of syntax, semantics and pragmatics feasible.
