= Idealized cognitive model =

In cognitive linguistics, an idealized cognitive model (ICM) is the phenomenon in which knowledge represented in a semantic frame is often a conceptualization of experience that is not congruent with reality. It has been proposed by scholars such as George Lakoff and Gilles Fauconnier.

== Bibliography ==
- George Lakoff (1987) Cognitive models and prototype theory, published at pp. 63–100 in Ulric Neisser (Ed.) Concepts and Conceptual Development: Ecological and Intellectual Factors in Categorization New York, Cambridge University Press.
- Croft, William and Cruse, D. Alan (2004) Cognitive Linguistics, Cambridge: Cambridge University Press. pp. 28– 32
