= Force dynamics =

Semantic category

Example of a force dynamics diagram

Force dynamics is a semantic category that describes the way in which entities interact with reference to force. Force Dynamics gained a good deal of attention in cognitive linguistics due to its claims of psychological plausibility and the elegance with which it generalizes ideas not usually considered in the same context. The semantic category of force dynamics pervades language on several levels. Not only does it apply to expressions in the physical domain like leaning on or dragging, but it also plays an important role in expressions involving psychological forces (e.g. wanting or being urged). Furthermore, the concept of force dynamics can be extended to discourse. For example, the situation in which speakers A and B argue, after which speaker A gives in to speaker B, exhibits a force dynamic pattern.

== Context ==
Introduced by cognitive linguist Leonard Talmy in 1981, force dynamics started out as a generalization of the traditional notion of the causative, dividing causation into finer primitives and considering the notions of letting, hindering, and helping. Talmy further developed the field in his 1985, 1988 and 2000 works.

Talmy places force dynamics within the broader context of cognitive semantics. In his view, a general idea underlying this discipline is the existence of a fundamental distinction in language between closed-class (grammatical) and open-class (lexical) categories. This distinction is motivated by the fact that language uses certain categories of notions to structure and organize meaning, while other categories are excluded from this function. For example, Talmy remarks that many languages mark the number of nouns in a systematic way, but that nouns are not marked in the same way for color. Force Dynamics is considered to be one of the closed-class notional categories, together with such generally recognized categories as number, aspect, mood, and evidentiality.

Aspects of force dynamics have been incorporated into the theoretical frameworks of Mark Johnson (1987), Steven Pinker (1997) and Ray Jackendoff (1990) (see Deane 1996 for a critical review of Jackendoff’s version of Force Dynamics). Force dynamics plays an important role in several recent accounts of modal verbs in various languages (including Brandt 1992, Achard 1996, Boye 2001, and Vandenberghe 2002). Other applications of force dynamics include use in discourse analysis (Talmy 1988, 2000), lexical semantics (Deane 1992, Da Silva 2003) and morphosyntactical analysis (Chun & Zubin 1990, Langacker 1999:352-4).

== Theoretical outline ==
=== Basic concepts ===
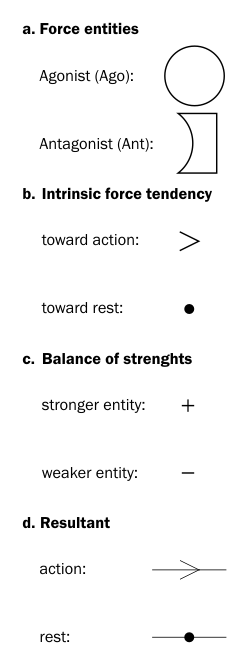
Figure 1 – Basic elements of the diagrammatic system commonly used to represent Force Dynamic patterns.

Expressions can exhibit a force dynamic pattern or can be force-dynamically neutral. A sentence like The door is closed is force-dynamically neutral, because there are no forces opposing each other. The sentence The door cannot open, on the other hand, exhibits a force dynamic pattern: apparently the door has some tendency toward opening, but there is some other force preventing it from being opened (e.g., it may be jammed).

A basic feature of a force-dynamic expression is the presence of two force-exerting elements. Languages make a distinction between these two forces based on their roles. The force entity that is in focus is called the agonist and the force entity opposing it is the Antagonist (see a, figure 1). In the example, the door is the agonist and the force preventing the door from being opened is the Antagonist.

Force entities have an intrinsic force tendency, either toward action or toward rest. For the agonist, this tendency is marked with an arrowhead (action) or with a large dot (rest) (see b, figure 1). Since the antagonist by definition has an opposing tendency, it need not be marked. In the example, the door has a tendency toward action.

A third relevant factor is the balance between the two forces. The forces are out of balance by definition; if the two forces are equally strong, the situation is not interesting from a force-dynamic point of view. One force is therefore stronger or weaker than the other. A stronger force is marked with a plus sign, a weaker force with a minus sign (c, figure 1). In the example, the Antagonist is stronger, since it actually holds back the door.

The outcome of the Force-Dynamic scenario depends on both the intrinsic tendency and the balance between the forces. The result is represented by a line beneath Agonist and Antagonist. The line has an arrowhead if the outcome is action and a large dot if the outcome is rest (d, figure 1). In the example, the door stays closed; the Antagonist succeeds in preventing it from being opened. The sentence 'The door cannot open' can be Force-Dynamically represented by the diagram at the top of this page.

Using these basic concepts, several generalizations can be made. The force dynamic situations in which the Agonist is stronger are expressed in sentences like ‘X happened despite Y’, while situations in which the Antagonist is stronger are expressed in the form of ‘X happened because of Y’. In the latter, a form of causation that Talmy termed extended causation is captured.

=== More complexity ===
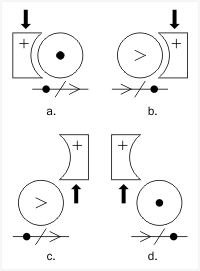
Figure 2 – force dynamic diagrams with a shifting Antagonist.

More possibilities arise when another variable is introduced: change over time. This variable is exemplified by such expressions as A gust of wind made the pages of my book turn. In force dynamic terms, the situation can be described as the entering of an antagonist (the wind) that is stronger in force than the agonist (the pages) and changes the force tendency of the pages from a state of rest to a state of action (turning). In force dynamic diagrams, this motion (‘change over time’) of the Antagonist is represented by an arrow.

The diagrams in Figure 2 to the right combine a shifting antagonist with agonists of varying force tendencies. The following sentences are examples for these patterns:

a. A gust of wind made the pages of my book turn.
b. The appearance of the headmaster made the pupils calm down.
c. The breaking of the dam let the water flow from the storage lake.
d. The abating of the wind let the sailboat slow down.

In this series of scenarios, various kinds of causation are described. Furthermore, a basic relationship between the concepts of ‘causing something to happen’ and ‘letting something happen’ emerges, definable in terms of the balance between the force entities and the resultants of the interaction.

Force entities do not have to be physical entities. Force dynamics is directly applicable to terms involving psychological forces like to persuade and to urge. The force dynamic aspect of the sentence Herbie did not succeed in persuading Diana to sing another song can be graphically represented as easily as the earlier example sentence The door cannot open (and, incidentally, by the same diagram).

In addition, force entities do not have to be physically separate. A case in point is reflexive force dynamic constructions of the type Chet was dragging himself instead of walking. It is perfectly possible to represent this in a Force Dynamic diagram (representing Chet’s will as the Agonist keeping the body — the Antagonist — in motion). Thus, even though Chet is one person, his will and his body are conceptualized separately.

=== Psychological basis ===
The key elements of force dynamics are very basic to human cognition. Deane (1996:56) commented that “[f]rom a cognitive perspective, Talmy’s theory is a striking example of a psychologically plausible theory of causation. Its key elements are such concepts as the (amount of) force exerted by an entity, the balance between two such forces, and the force vector which results from their interaction. Such concepts have an obvious base in ordinary motor activities: the brain must be able to calculate the force vector produced by muscular exertion, and calculate the probable outcome when that force is exerted against an object in the outside world.”

In cognitive linguistic terms, force dynamic expressions reflect a conceptual archetype because of their conceptual basality (Langacker 1999:24). In this view, expressions involving psychological forces reflect an extension of the category of force dynamics from the physical domain to the psychological domain.

== Limitations and criticism ==
From the perspective of lexical semantics, some people have argued that force dynamics fails to be explanatory. For example, Goddard (1998:262–266) raised the objection that "a visual representation cannot — in and of itself — convey a meaning. (…) From a semiotic point of view, a diagram never stands alone; it always depends on a system of verbal captions, whether these are explicit or implied." He goes on to attack the verbal definition of causation Talmy provides, claiming that it is circular and obscure. Furthermore, Goddard objects to the use of the "semantically obscure concept of force". However, Goddard's objections lose some of their strength in light of the fact that Force Dynamics does not present itself as a complete semantic description of the constructions involving Force Dynamic concepts.

Another objection regarding force dynamics is the question, raised by Goddard (1998:81), of how different representational devices are supposed to interact with one another. As the field of cognitive linguistics is still in a state of theoretical flux, no systematic account addresses this issue yet. However, it is an objection many cognitive linguists are aware of. Some cognitive linguists have replied to such objections by pointing out that the goal of Cognitive Linguistics is not to construct a formal system in which theorems are proved, but rather to better understand the cognitive basis of language (cf. Newman 1996:xii).

Jackendoff (1990, 1996:120–3), in the process of incorporating aspects of force dynamics into his theory of conceptual semantics, has proposed a reconfiguration of some of its basic notions. In Jackendoff’s view, this reconfiguration "conforms better to the syntax of force-dynamic verbs" (1996:121).
