= The Act of Creation =

1964 book by Arthur Koestler

- First UK edition
- Author: Arthur Koestler
- Language: English
- Subject: Psychology
- Publisher: Hutchinson (UK); Macmillan (US)
- Publication date: 1964
- Publication place: United Kingdom
- Media type: Print
- Pages: 751

The Act of Creation is a 1964 book by Arthur Koestler. It is a study of the processes of discovery, invention, imagination and creativity in humour, science, and the arts. It lays out Koestler's attempt to develop an elaborate general theory of human creativity.

From describing and comparing many different examples of invention and discovery, Koestler concludes that they all share a common pattern which he terms "bisociation" – a blending of elements drawn from two previously unrelated matrices of thought into a new matrix of meaning by way of a process involving comparison, abstraction and categorisation, analogies and metaphors. He regards many different mental phenomena based on comparison (such as analogies, metaphors, parables, allegories, jokes, identification, role-playing, acting, personification, anthropomorphism etc.), as special cases of "bisociation".

== Book One: The Art of Discovery and the Discoveries of Art ==
The Act of Creation is divided into two books. In the first book, Koestler proposes a global theory of creative activity encompassing humour, scientific inquiry, and art. Koestler's fundamental idea is that any creative act is a bisociation (not mere association) of two (or more) apparently incompatible frames of thought. Employing a spatial metaphor, Koestler calls such frames of thought matrices: "any ability, habit, or skill, any pattern of ordered behaviour governed by a 'code' of fixed rules." Koestler argues that the diverse forms of human creativity all correspond to variations of his model of bisociation.

In jokes and humour, the audience is led to expect a certain outcome compatible with a particular matrix (e.g. the narrative storyline); a punch line, however, replaces the original matrix with an alternative to comic effect. The structure of a joke, then, is essentially that of bait-and-switch. In scientific inquiry, the two matrices are fused into a new larger synthesis. The recognition that two previously disconnected matrices are compatible generates the experience of eureka. Finally, in the arts and in ritual, the two matrices are held in juxtaposition to one another. Observing art is a process of experiencing this juxtaposition, with both matrices sustained.

According to Koestler, many bisociative creative breakthroughs occur after a period of intense conscious effort directed at the creative goal or problem, in a period of relaxation when rational thought is abandoned, like during dreams and trances. Koestler affirms that all creatures have the capacity for creative activity, frequently suppressed by the automatic routines of thought and behaviour that dominate their lives.

== Book Two: Habit and Originality ==
The second book of The Act of Creation aims to develop a biological and psychological foundation for the theory of creation proposed in book one. Koestler found the psychology of his day (behaviorism, cognitivism) portraying man merely as an automaton, disregarded the creative abilities of the mind. Koestler draws on theories of play, imprinting, motivation, perception, Gestalt psychology, and others to lay a theoretical foundation for his theory of creativity.

== Literature ==
- Reed Merrill: Arthur Koestler. In: Irene R. Makaryk (Ed.): Encyclopedia of contemporary literary theory. University of Toronto Press, 1993, ISBN 0-8020-6860-X, pp. 390–392.

== See also ==
- Analogy
- Conceptual blending
- Conceptual metaphor theory
- Creativity
- Gregory Bateson
- Invention
- Smile
