= Spanish Cognitive Linguistics Association =

The Spanish Cognitive Linguistics Association (in Spanish: Asociación Española de Lingüística Cognitiva, AELCo/SCOLA) was founded in Alicante in 1998. Its main goal is to encourage research related to the study of language from the viewpoint of Cognitive Linguistics in Spain.

== International conferences ==
AELCo/SCOLA organises international conferences (Congresos internacionales) every two years since 1998 at different universities in Spain. Conferences have been held at

- University of Alicante 1998
- Complutense University of Madrid 2000
- University of Valencia 2002
- University of Zaragoza 2004
- University of Murcia 2006
- University of Jaume I, Castellón 2008
- University of Castilla-La Mancha (Toledo) 2010
- University of Almería 2012
- University of Extremadura (Badajoz) 2014
- University of Alcalá 2016
- University of Córdoba 2018
- University of La Rioja 2022
- University of Granada 2024

The 2026 congress is scheduled to be held at the University of Murcia.

== Journals ==
The Journal of the Association is the Review of Cognitive Linguistics published by John Benjamins from 2010 onwards, with an impact factor 0.595. It replaced the Annual Review of Cognitive Linguistics, published by the same publisher in 2003-2009.
