= Anankastic conditional =

Grammatical construction

An anankastic conditional is a grammatical construction of the form

If you want X, you have to do Y.

where Y is required in order to get X. For example:

If you wanna be my lover, you gotta get with my friends.

Not all conditionals of this form have an anankastic interpretation:

If you want to eat chocolate, you should try thinking about something else.

where thinking about something else is not required in order to eat chocolate, but is rather advice on how to avoid eating chocolate.

The term comes from the Greek ἀναγκαστικός "compulsory", from ἀνάγκη "necessity".

Anankastic conditionals have been argued to pose problems for compositional semantics. Other semanticists have argued that anankastic conditionals can be interpreted the same way as "regular, hypothetical, indicative conditionals".
