= Leonard Talmy =

American professor of cognitive linguistics and philosophy

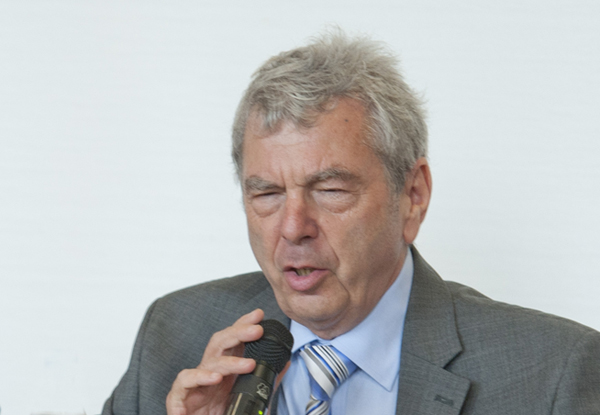
Professor Leonard Talmy, recipient of the Gutenberg Research Award 2012

Leonard Talmy is Professor Emeritus of linguistics and philosophy and Director Emeritus of the Center for Cognitive Science at the University at Buffalo in New York. Born on June 17, 1942, he received his Ph.D. in Linguistics at the University of California, Berkeley, in 1972.

== Biography ==
Talmy has helped found and develop the area of cognitive semantics. His research has covered typologies and universals of semantic structure; the interaction between semantic structure and lexical, morphological, and syntactic structure; the relation of this to discourse, diachrony, culture, and evolution; and the implications of all this material for conceptual organization and cognitive theory.

His work was the basis for the first, second, and third "Talmyan Semantics Conference" in China in 2019, 2020, and 2021. He was the recipient of the 2012 Gutenberg Research Award and 10,000 Euro prize from the Johannes Gutenberg University of Mainz, Germany, for outstanding contributions to research in the area of linguistics. In 2011, he was honored as one of the three "Founding Fathers" of cognitive linguistics at the 10th Biannual Conference of the International Cognitive Linguistics Association. He was elected a Fellow of the Cognitive Science Society in its 2002 inaugural selection of Fellows.

== See also ==
- Force dynamics
- Figure-ground
- Cognitive linguistics

== Books ==
- Toward a Cognitive Semantics (2000) -- two volumes
- The Targeting System of Language (The MIT Press, January 2018)

== Published articles ==
- "The Relation of Grammar to Cognition"
- "Force Dynamics in Language and Cognition"
- "How Language Structures Space"
- "Fictive Motion in Language and `Ception'"
- "Lexicalization Patterns"
- "The Representation of Spatial Structure in Spoken and Signed Languages: a Neural Model"
- "Recombinance in the Evolution of Language"

Most of his published work can be found on his academic website.
