= Grammatical construction =

Syntactic string of words

In linguistics, a grammatical construction is any syntactic string of words ranging from sentences over phrasal structures to certain complex lexemes, such as phrasal verbs.

Grammatical constructions form the primary unit of study in construction grammar theories. In construction grammar, cognitive grammar, and cognitive linguistics, a grammatical construction is a syntactic template that is paired with conventionalized semantic and pragmatic content. In generative frameworks, constructions are generally treated as epiphenomenal, being derived by the general syntactic rules of the language in question.

== See also ==
- Construction grammar
- Formal grammar
