= Mark Turner (cognitive scientist) =

American cognitive scientist (born 1954)

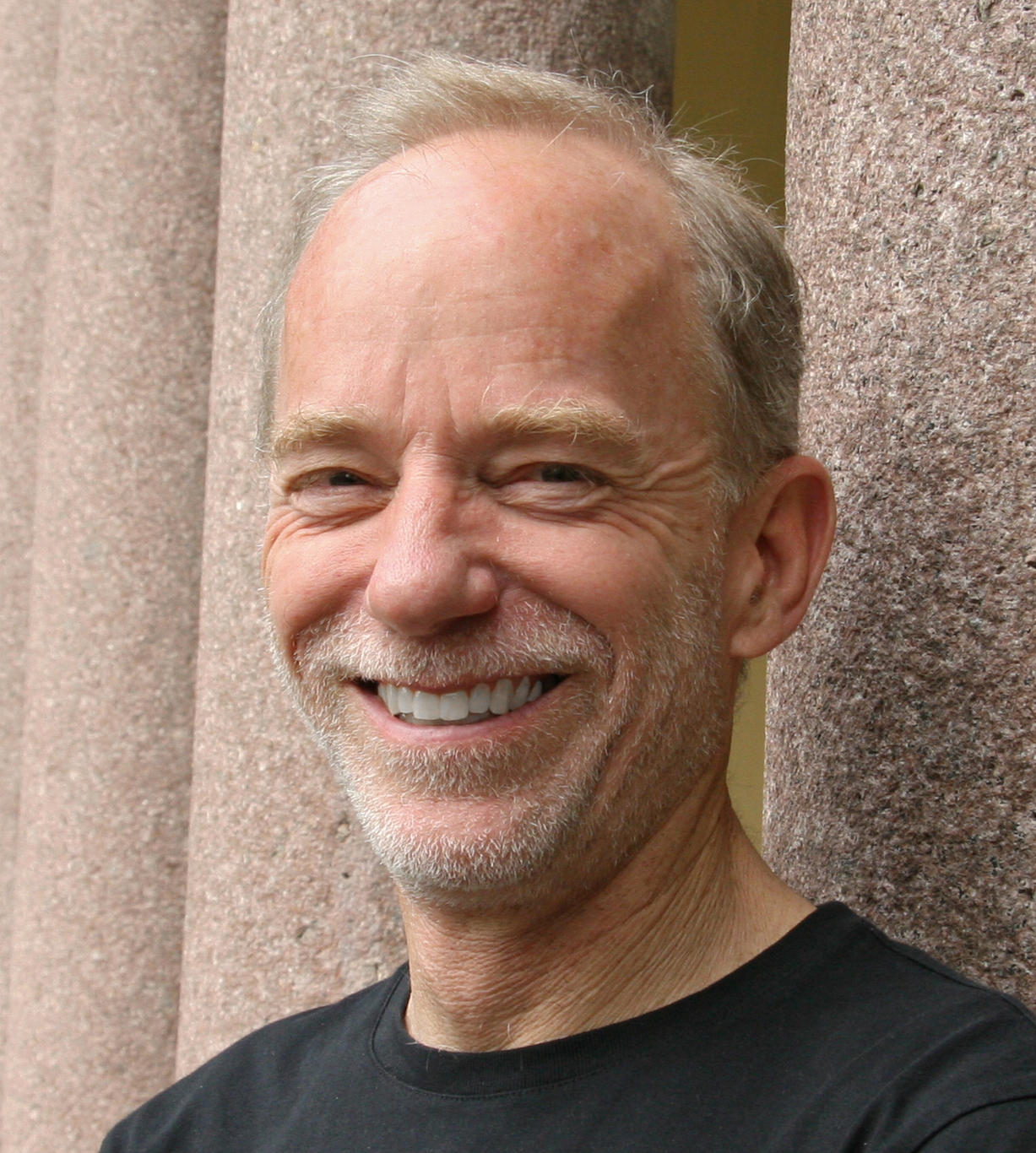
- Born: 1954 (age 71–72); United States
- Education: University of California, Berkeley
- Spouse: Megan Whalen Turner
- Awards: Anneliese Maier Research Prize (Alexander von Humboldt Foundation) (2015); Prix du Rayonnement de la langue et de la littérature françaises (Académie française) (1996)
- Scientific career
- Fields: cognitive science, linguistics, decision-making, reasoning, communication, media, marketing
- Workplaces: Case Western Reserve University
- Website: markturner.org

Mark Turner (born 1954) is a cognitive scientist, linguist, and author. He is Institute Professor and Professor of Cognitive Science at Case Western Reserve University. He has won an Anneliese Maier Research Prize from the Alexander von Humboldt Foundation (2015) and a Grand Prix (Prix du Rayonnement de la langue et de la littérature françaises) from the French Academy (1996) for his work in these fields. Turner and Gilles Fauconnier founded the theory of conceptual blending, presented in textbooks and encyclopedias. Turner is also the director of the Cognitive Science Network (CSN) and co-director of the Distributed Little Red Hen Lab.

His wife is the writer Megan Whalen Turner.

== Books ==
- Death is the Mother of Beauty: Mind, Metaphor, Criticism (University of Chicago Press, 1987)
- More Than Cool Reason: A Field Guide to Poetic Metaphor (with George Lakoff, University of Chicago Press, 1989)
- Reading Minds: The Study of English in the Age of Cognitive Science (Princeton University Press, 1991)
- The Literary Mind: The Origins of Thought and Language (Oxford University Press, 1996)
- Cognitive Dimensions of Social Science: The Way We Think About Politics, Economics, Law, and Society (Oxford University Press, 2001)
- The Way We Think: Conceptual Blending and the Mind's Hidden Complexities (with Gilles Fauconnier, Basic Books, 2002)
- The Artful Mind: Cognitive Science and the Riddle of Human Creativity (Oxford University Press, 2006)
- Clear and Simple as the Truth: Writing Classic Prose Second Edition (with Francis-Noël Thomas, Princeton University Press, 2011) ISBN 978-0-691-14743-7.
- The Origin of Ideas: Blending, Creativity, and the Human Spark (Oxford University Press, 2014)
- Copilots for Linguists: AI, Constructions, and Frames (with Tiago Torrent, Thomas Hoffmann, and Arthur Lorenzi, (Cambridge University Press, 2023)

== See also ==
- Conceptual blending
- Conceptual metaphor
- Cognitive linguistics
- Cognitive rhetoric
- Cognitive philology
- Metaphor
