= International Cognitive Linguistics Association =

International linguistic organization

The International Cognitive Linguistics Association (ICLA) is a linguistics association that sponsors conferences, major journals and books for relevant research in the field of linguistics. It is involved in the publication of research, a website and discussion forum, fosters regional affiliates, and provides a community for researchers in cognitive linguistics and others interested in such research The ICLA is affiliated, among others, with the UK Cognitive Linguistics Association (UK-CLA) the Slavic Cognitive Linguistics Association (SLCA) and Polish Cognitive Linguistics Association.

The association is multi-disciplinary and inter-disciplinary in order to include human cognitive and cultural models. It has links with cognitive and social psychology, evolutionary and cultural anthropology, sociology, philosophy, and human interaction.

== Conferences ==
The ICLA holds official ICLA conferences. The first ICLA conference was held in June 1989 in Duisburg, Germany. Subsequent conferences were held at universities such as the University of California, Free University of Amsterdam, Stockholm University, and there is an upcoming event in 2011, Xi'an, China.
