= Oswald Ducrot =

French linguist (1930–2024)

Oswald Ducrot (27 November 1930 – 8 June 2024) was a French linguist. He was a professor and research fellow at CNRS. He was recently a professor (directeur d'études) at the Ecole des Hautes Etudes en Sciences Sociales (EHESS) in Paris.

He was the author of a number of works, particularly on enunciation. He developed a theory of argumentation in language with Jean-Claude Anscombre.

Ducrot died on 8 June 2024, at the age of 93.

== Bibliography ==
- with Tzvetan Todorov, Dictionnaire encyclopédique des sciences du langage, Seuil, 1972; 1979
- La preuve et le dire, Maison Mame, 1973
- Le structuralisme en linguistique, Seuil, Points, 1973 (d'abord publié dans un Collectif sur le structuralisme en 1968).
- Dire et ne pas dire. Principes de sémantique linguistique, Hermann, 3e éd. augm., 1998
- Le Dire et le Dit, Minuit, 1980
- Les Echelles argumentatives, Minuit, 1980
- et al. Les Mots du discours, Minuit, 1980
- with Jean-Claude Anscombre, L'argumentation dans la langue, Mardaga, 1983
- Logique, structure, énonciation. Lectures sur le langage, Minuit, 1989
- with Jean-Marie Schaeffer, Nouveau Dictionnaire encyclopédique des sciences du langage, Seuil, 1999
- with Marion Carel, La semántica argumentativa. Una introducción a la teoría de los bloques semánticos. Translated and edited by María Marta García Negroni and Alfredo Lescano. Buenos Aires, Colihue Universidad, 2005.
