= Prototype theory =

Theory of categorization in psychology

Prototype theory is a theory of categorization in cognitive science, particularly in psychology and cognitive linguistics, in which there is a graded degree of belonging to a conceptual category, and some members are more central than others. It emerged in 1971 with the work of psychologist Eleanor Rosch, and it has been described as a "Copernican Revolution" in the theory of categorization for its departure from the traditional Aristotelian categories. It has been criticized by those that still endorse the traditional theory of categories, like linguist Eugenio Coseriu and other proponents of the structural semantics paradigm.

In prototype theory, any given concept in any given language has a real world example that best represents this concept. For example: when asked to give an example of the concept furniture, a couch is more frequently cited than, say, a wardrobe. Prototype theory has also been applied in linguistics, as part of the mapping from phonological structure to semantics.

In formulating prototype theory, Rosch drew in part from previous insights in particular the formulation of a category model based on family resemblance by Wittgenstein (1953), and by Roger Brown's How shall a thing be called? (1958).

== Overview and terminology ==
The term prototype, as defined in psychologist Eleanor Rosch's study "Natural Categories", was initially defined as denoting a stimulus, which takes a salient position in the formation of a category, due to the fact that it is the first stimulus to be associated with that category. Rosch later defined it as the most central member of a category.

Rosch and others developed prototype theory as a response to, and radical departure from, the classical theory of concepts, which defines concepts by necessary and sufficient conditions. Necessary conditions refers to the set of features every instance of a concept must present, and sufficient conditions are those that no other entity possesses. Rather than defining concepts by features, the prototype theory defines categories based on either a specific artifact of that category or by a set of entities within the category that represent a prototypical member. The prototype of a category can be understood in lay terms by the object or member of a class most often associated with that class. The prototype is the center of the class, with all other members moving progressively further from the prototype, which leads to the gradation of categories. Every member of the class is not equally central in human cognition. As in the example of furniture above, couch is more central than wardrobe. Contrary to the classical view, prototypes and gradations lead to an understanding of category membership not as an all-or-nothing approach, but as more of a web of interlocking categories which overlap.

Further development of prototype theory by psychologist James Hampton, and others replaced the notion of prototypes being the most typical exemplar, with the proposal that a prototype is a bundle of correlated features. These features may or may not be true of all members of the class (necessary or defining features), but they will all be associated with being a typical member or the class. By this means, two aspects of concept structure can be explained. Some exemplars are more typical of a category than others, because they are a better fit to the concept prototype, having more of the features. Importantly, Hampton's prototype model explains the vagueness that can occur at the boundary of conceptual categories. While some may think of pictures, telephones or cookers as atypical furniture, others will say they are not furniture at all. Membership of a category can be a matter of degree, and the same features that give rise to typicality structure are also responsible for graded degrees of category membership.

In Cognitive linguistics it has been argued that linguistic categories also have a prototype structure, like categories of common words in a language.

== Categories ==
=== Basic level categories ===
The other notion related to prototypes is that of a basic level in cognitive categorization. Basic categories are relatively homogeneous in terms of sensory-motor affordances — a chair is associated with bending of one's knees, a fruit with picking it up and putting it in your mouth, etc. At the subordinate level (e.g. [dentist's chairs], [kitchen chairs] etc.) few significant features can be added to that of the basic level; whereas at the superordinate level, these conceptual similarities are hard to pinpoint. A picture of a chair is easy to draw (or visualize), but drawing furniture would be more difficult.

Psychologists Eleanor Rosch, Carolyn Mervis and colleagues defined the basic level as that level that has the highest degree of cue validity and category validity. Thus, a category like [animal] may have a prototypical member, but no cognitive visual representation. On the other hand, basic categories in [animal], i.e. [dog], [bird], [fish], are full of informational content and can easily be categorized in terms of Gestalt and semantic features. Basic level categories tend to have the same parts and recognizable images.

Clearly semantic models based on attribute-value pairs fail to identify privileged levels in the hierarchy. Functionally, it is thought that basic level categories are a decomposition of the world into maximally informative categories. Thus, they

- maximize the number of attributes shared by members of the category, and
- minimize the number of attributes shared with other categories

However, the notion of Basic-ness as a Level can be problematic. Linguistically, types of bird (swallow, robin, gull) are basic level - they have mono-morphemic nouns, which fall under the superordinate BIRD, and have subordinates expressed by noun phrases (herring gull, male robin). Yet in psychological terms, bird behaves as a basic level term. At the same time, atypical birds such as ostrich and penguin are themselves basic level terms, having very distinct outlines and not sharing obvious parts with other birds.

More problems arise when the notion of a prototype is applied to lexical categories other than the noun. Verbs, for example, seem to defy a clear prototype: [to run] is hard to split up in more or less central members.

In her 1975 paper, Rosch asked 200 American college students to rate, on a scale of 1 to 7, whether they regarded certain items as good examples of the category furniture. These items ranged from chair and sofa, ranked number 1, to a love seat (number 10), to a lamp (number 31), all the way to a telephone, ranked number 60.

While one may differ from this list in terms of cultural specifics, the point is that such a graded categorization is likely to be present in all cultures. Further evidence that some members of a category are more privileged than others came from experiments involving:

1. Response Times: in which queries involving prototypical members (e.g. is a robin a bird) elicited faster response times than for non-prototypical members.
2. Priming: When primed with the higher-level (superordinate) category, subjects were faster in identifying if two words are the same. Thus, after flashing furniture, the equivalence of chair-chair is detected more rapidly than stove-stove.
3. Exemplars: When asked to name a few exemplars, the more prototypical items came up more frequently.

Subsequent to Rosch's work, prototype effects have been investigated widely in areas such as colour cognition, and also for more abstract notions: subjects may be asked, e.g. "to what degree is this narrative an instance of telling a lie?". Similar work has been done on actions (verbs like look, kill, speak, walk [Pulman:83]), adjectives like "tall", etc.

Another aspect in which Prototype Theory departs from traditional Aristotelian categorization is that there do not appear to be natural kind categories (bird, dog) vs. artifacts (toys, vehicles).

A common comparison is the use of prototype or the use of exemplars in category classification. Medin, Altom, and Murphy found that using a mixture of prototype and exemplar information, participants were more accurately able to judge categories. Participants who were presented with prototype values classified based on similarity to stored prototypes and stored exemplars, whereas participants who only had experience with exemplar only relied on the similarity to stored exemplars. Smith and Minda looked at the use of prototypes and exemplars in dot-pattern category learning. They found that participants used more prototypes than they used exemplars, with the prototypes being the center of the category, and exemplars surrounding it.

== Distance between concepts ==
The notion of prototypes is related to Wittgenstein's (later) discomfort with the traditional notion of category. This influential theory has resulted in a view of semantic components more as possible rather than necessary contributors to the meaning of texts. His discussion on the category game is particularly incisive:

Consider for example the proceedings that we call 'games'. I mean board games, card games, ball games, Olympic games, and so on. What is common to them all? Don't say, "There must be something common, or they would not be called 'games'"--but look and see whether there is anything common to all. For if you look at them you will not see something common to all, but similarities, relationships, and a whole series of them at that. To repeat: don't think, but look! Look for example at board games, with their multifarious relationships. Now pass to card games; here you find many correspondences with the first group, but many common features drop out, and others appear. When we pass next to ball games, much that is common is retained, but much is lost. Are they all 'amusing'? Compare chess with noughts and crosses. Or is there always winning and losing, or competition between players? Think of patience. In ball games there is winning and losing; but when a child throws his ball at the wall and catches it again, this feature has disappeared. Look at the parts played by skill and luck; and at the difference between skill in chess and skill in tennis. Think now of games like ring-a-ring-a-roses; here is the element of amusement, but how many other characteristic features have disappeared! And we can go through the many, many other groups of games in the same way; can see how similarities crop up and disappear. And the result of this examination is: we see a complicated network of similarities overlapping and criss-crossing: sometimes overall similarities, sometimes similarities of detail.

Wittgenstein's theory of family resemblance describes the phenomenon when people group concepts based on a series of overlapping features, rather than by one feature which exists throughout all members of the category. For example, basketball and baseball share the use of a ball, and baseball and chess share the feature of a winner, etc., rather than one defining feature of "games". Therefore, there is a distance between focal, or prototypical members of the category, and those that continue outwards from them, linked by shared features.

Peter Gärdenfors has elaborated a possible partial explanation of prototype theory in terms of multi-dimensional feature spaces called conceptual spaces, where a category is defined in terms of a conceptual distance. More central members of a category are "between" the peripheral members. He postulates that most natural categories exhibit a convexity in conceptual space, in that if x and y are elements of a category, and if z is between x and y, then z is also likely to belong to the category.

== Combining categories ==
Within language we find instances of combined categories, such as tall man or small elephant. Combining categories was a problem for extensional semantics, where the semantics of a word such as red is to be defined as the set of objects having this property. This does not apply as well to modifiers such as small; a small mouse is very different from a small elephant.

These combinations pose a lesser problem in terms of prototype theory. In situations involving adjectives (e.g. tall), one encounters the question of whether or not the prototype of [tall] is a 6 foot tall man, or a 400-foot skyscraper. The solution emerges by contextualizing the notion of prototype in terms of the object being modified. This extends even more radically in compounds such as red wine or red hair which are hardly red in the prototypical sense, but the red indicates merely a shift from the prototypical colour of wine or hair respectively. The addition of red shifts the prototype from the one of hair to that of red hair. The prototype is changed by additional specific information, and combines features from the prototype of red and wine.

== Dynamic structure and distance ==
Mikulincer, Mario & Paz, Dov & Kedem, Perry focused on the dynamic nature of prototypes and how represented semantic categories actually changes due to emotional states. The 4 part study assessed the relationships between situational stress and trait anxiety and the way people organize the hierarchical level at which semantic stimuli are categorized, the way people categorize natural objects, the narrowing of the breadth of categories and the proneness to use less inclusive levels of categorization instead of more inclusive ones.

== Critique ==
Prototype theory has been criticized by those that still endorse the classic theory of categories, like linguist Eugenio Coseriu and other proponents of the structural semantics paradigm.

=== Exemplar theory ===
Douglas L. Medin and Marguerite M. Schaffer showed by experiment that a context theory of classification which derives concepts purely from exemplars (cf. exemplar theory) worked better than a class of theories that included prototype theory.

=== Graded categorization ===
Linguists, including Stephen Laurence writing with Eric Margolis, have suggested problems with the prototype theory. In their 1999 paper, they raise several issues. One of which is that prototype theory does not intrinsically guarantee graded categorization. When subjects were asked to rank how well certain members exemplify the category, they rated some members above others. For example, robins were seen as being "birdier" than ostriches, but when asked whether these categories are "all-or-nothing" or have fuzzier boundaries, the subjects stated that they were defined, "all-or-nothing" categories. Laurence and Margolis concluded that "prototype structure has no implication for whether subjects represent a category as being graded" (p. 33).

=== Compound concepts ===
A guppy is not a prototype pet, nor a prototype fish, but it is a prototype pet-fish. This challenges the idea that prototypes are created from their constituent parts.

Daniel Osherson and Edward Smith raised the issue of pet fish for which the prototype might be a guppy kept in a bowl in someone's house. The prototype for pet might be a dog or cat, and the prototype for fish might be trout or salmon. However, the features of these prototypes do not present in the prototype for pet fish, therefore this prototype must be generated from something other than its constituent parts.

James Hampton found that prototypes for conjunctive concepts such as pet fish are produced by a compositional function operating on the features of each concept. Initially all features of each concept are added to the prototype of the conjunction. There is then a consistency check - for example pets are warm and cuddly but fish cannot be. Fish are often eaten for dinner, but pets are never. Hence the conjunctive prototype fails to inherit features of either concept that are incompatible with the other concept. A final stage in the process looks for knowledge of the class in long term memory, and if the class is familiar may add extra features - a process called "extensional feedback". The model was tested by showing how apparently logical syntactic conjunctions or disjunctions, such as "A sport which is also a game" or "Vehicles that are not Machines", or "Fruits or Vegetables" fail to conform to Boolean set logic. Chess is considered to be a sport which is a game, but is not considered to be a sport. Mushrooms are considered to be either a fruit or a vegetable, but when asked separately very few people consider them to be a vegetable and no-one considers them to be a fruit.

Antonio Lieto and Gian Luca Pozzato have proposed a typicality-based compositional logic (TCL) that is able to account for both complex human-like concept combinations (like the PET-FISH problem) and conceptual blending. Their framework shows how concepts expressed as prototypes can account for the phenomenon of prototypical compositionality in concept combination.

== See also ==
- Francis Galton – British eugenist, polymath, and behavioural geneticist (1822–1911)
- Composite portrait – Galton's technique for creating a generic image of all members of a photographed group
- Exemplar theory – Psychological categorization proposal
- Family resemblance – Philosophical idea popularized by Ludwig Wittgenstein
- Folksonomy – Classification based on users' tags
- Frame semantics – Linguistic theory
- Intuitive statistics
- Platonic ideal – Philosophical theory attributed to Plato
- Semantic feature-comparison model
- Similarity (philosophy) – Relation of resemblance between objects
