= William Croft (linguist) =

American linguist (born 1956)

William Croft (born November 13, 1956) is an American professor of linguistics at the University of New Mexico, United States. From 1994 to 2005 he was successively research fellow, lecturer, reader and professor in Linguistics at the University of Manchester, UK.

He is the inventor of and advocate for radical construction grammar, which among other things uses box-diagrams to compare and contrast the grammatical features of different natural languages.

William Croft is a member of Save the Redwoods League's Board of Councillors.

== Partial bibliography ==
- —— (1991). Syntactic Categories and Grammatical Relations: The Cognitive Organization of Information. Chicago: University of Chicago Press. ISBN 978-0-226-12090-4.
- —— (2001). Explaining language change: an evolutionary approach. Harlow: Longman. ISBN 978-0-582-35677-1.
- —— (2001). Radical Construction Grammar: Syntactic theory in typological perspective. Oxford: Oxford University Press. ISBN 978-0-19-829954-7.
- —— (2003). Typology and Universals. Cambridge Textbooks in Linguistics (2nd ed.). Cambridge: Cambridge University Press. ISBN 978-0-521-00499-2.
  - —— (1990). Typology and Universals. Cambridge Textbooks in Linguistics (1st ed.). Cambridge: Cambridge University Press. ISBN 978-0-521-36583-3.
- ——; Cruse, D. A. (2004). Cognitive Linguistics. Cambridge Textbooks in Linguistics. ISBN 978-0-521-66770-8.
- —— (2012). Verbs: aspect and causal structure. Oxford: Oxford University Press. ISBN 978-0-19-924858-2.
