= Conceptual blending =

Theory of cognition

In cognitive linguistics and artificial intelligence, conceptual blending, also called conceptual integration or view application, is a theory of cognition developed by Gilles Fauconnier and Mark Turner. According to this theory, elements and vital relations from diverse scenarios are "blended" in a subconscious process, which is assumed to be ubiquitous to everyday thought and language. Much like memetics, it is an attempt to create a unitary account of the cultural transmission of ideas.

== History ==
The development of this theory began in 1993 and a representative early formulation is found in the online article "Conceptual Integration and Formal Expression". Turner and Fauconnier cite Arthur Koestler's 1964 book The Act of Creation as an early forerunner of conceptual blending: Koestler had identified a common pattern in creative achievements in the arts, sciences and humor that he had termed "bisociation of matrices." A newer version of blending theory, with somewhat different terminology, was presented in Turner and Fauconnier's 2002 book, The Way We Think. Conceptual blending, in the Fauconnier and Turner formulation, is one of the theoretical tools used in George Lakoff and Rafael Núñez's Where Mathematics Comes From, in which the authors assert that "understanding mathematics requires the mastering of extensive networks of metaphorical blends."

== Computational models ==
Conceptual blending is closely related to frame-based theories, but goes beyond these primarily in that it is a theory of how to combine frames (or frame-like objects). An early computational model of a process called "view application", which is closely related to conceptual blending (which did not exist at the time), was implemented in the 1980s by Shrager at Carnegie Mellon University and PARC, and applied in the domains of causal reasoning about complex devices and scientific reasoning. More recent computational accounts of blending have been developed in areas such as mathematics. Some later models are based upon structure mapping, which did not exist at the time of the earlier implementations. Recently, within the context of non-monotonic extensions of AI reasoning systems (and in line with the frame-based theories), a general framework able to account for both complex human-like concept combinations (like the PET-FISH problem) and conceptual blending has been tested and developed in both cognitive modelling and computational creativity applications.

== Philosophical status of the theory ==
In his book The Literary Mind, conceptual blending theorist Mark Turner states that

Conceptual blending is a fundamental instrument of the everyday mind, used in our basic construal of all our realities, from the social to the scientific.

Insights obtained from conceptual blends represent the products of creative thinking. However conceptual blending theory is not a complete account of creativity, since it does not address the question of where the inputs to a blend originate. In other words, while conceptual blending provides a useful terminology for describing creative products, it offers little explanation for the source of inspiration.

== Network model ==
=== Characteristics of blending ===
As described by Fauconnier and Turner, mental spaces are small conceptual containers used to structure processes behind human reasoning and communication. They are constantly created as people think and talk to serve a specific purpose depending on the context. The basic structure of an integration network consists of at least four distinct, interconnected spaces, which can be modified at any point as a discourse unfolds. Fauconnier and Turner also propose that mental spaces are generated in working memory and linked to knowledge stored in long-term memory. The elements within these mental spaces are thought to correspond to the activation of specific groups of neurons.

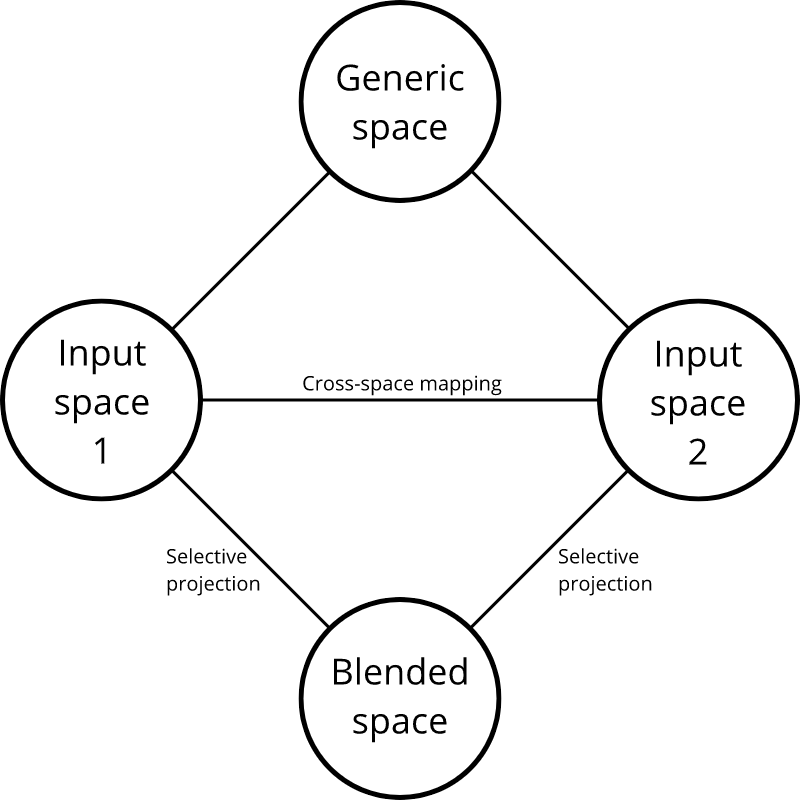
The network model

The different types of mental spaces proposed are as follows:

- Generic space – captures a common structure present across all input spaces.
- Input space – provides the specific contents of a situation or idea.
- Blended space – integrates a general structure from the generic space along with selected elements from input spaces chosen, mapped onto it through selective projection.
- Cross-space mapping – represents connections between counterparts in the input spaces, such as metaphoric relationships between matching structures.

In more complex integration networks, multiple input and blended spaces may be involved.

=== Blending ===
The process of blending results in the creation of an emergent structure within the blended space. This new structure, which does not exist directly in any of the input spaces, is essential for achieving a particular goal. The emergent structure is generated through three key operations:

- Composition – establishes relations between elements that become observable only when elements from separate input spaces are combined.
- Completion – adds further meaning to the blended space by incorporating associations linked to elements in the input spaces.
- Elaboration – develops the blend dynamically, as though it were being run like a mental simulation.

Additionally, selective projection highlights that not all elements from the input spaces are carried over into the blend.

=== Example of a blend – Buddhist monk ===
To illustrate how the blend works, Fauconnier and Turner present the riddle of the Buddhist monk, which was originally discussed by Arthur Koestler in his book The Act of Creation (1964):

A Buddhist monk begins at dawn one day walking up a mountain, reaches the top at sunset, meditates at the top for several days until one dawn when he begins to walk back to the foot of the mountain, which he reaches at sunset. Making no assumptions about his starting or stopping or about his pace during the trips, prove that there is a place on the path which he occupies at the same hour of the day on the two separate journeys.

Solving the riddle requires imagining a scenario in which the monk ascends and descends the mountain on the same day. Although this situation is impossible in reality, it serves as a hypothetical construct that enables the solution. Framed in this way, it becomes clear that there must be a point on the path and a moment in time when the monk "meets" himself. This meeting serves as proof that such a place exists, as the riddle requires.

In terms of blending theory:

- The monk’s ascent on one day is represented as one input space, while his descent on another day is represented as a second input space.
- The cross-space mapping connects the monk in the ascent input with the monk in the descent input, illustrating how counterparts can be aligned.
- The generic space contains shared elements, such as the mountain path, which is common to both inputs.
- The blended space is where integration occurs. Some elements, like the day and the mountain path, are merged into unified structures, while others, such as the monks themselves, are projected separately.

Because the projection preserves both the time of day and the direction of motion, the blend contains two distinct monks. Within this blended space, it is possible to run the scenario dynamically, leading to the moment when the monk meets himself.

=== Four main types of integration network ===
==== Simplex ====
In a simplex network, one of the input spaces contains organising frames, and the other includes specific elements. In this type of integration network, the roles associated with the frame from one input space are projected onto the blended space together with the values as elements from the other input space. Then they are integrated into a new structure.

==== Mirror ====
A mirror network is characterised by a shared organising frame present in each of the mental spaces. The Buddhist Monk riddle is an example of this network.

==== Single-scope ====
A single-scope network consists of two input spaces which have different organising frames. In this situation, only one frame is projected into the blended space.

==== Double-scope ====
In a double-scope network, there are two different organising frames in input spaces, and the blended space contains parts of each of those frames from both input spaces.

=== Vital relations ===
Vital relations describe some of the connections between the elements of the different input spaces. For example, in the Buddhist Monk riddle, time is treated as a vital relation which is compressed in the blended space, and as a result, the monk can simultaneously walk up and down the mountain. Some of the other types of vital relations include cause-effect, change, space, identity, role and part-whole.

== Criticism ==
The main criticism against the conceptual blending theory was proposed by Raymond W. Gibbs Jr. (2000), who pointed out the lack of testable hypotheses which are necessary if the theory is to predict any behaviour. He has explained that the blending theory cannot be treated as a single theory but rather as a framework. Since there is no one fundamental hypothesis to test, many various hypotheses should be tested instead which can be problematic for the theory. Gibbs has also suggested that inferring information about language processes from the analysis of the products of these processes may not be a correct approach. Furthermore, he has proposed that other linguistic theories are equally effective in explaining the various cognitive phenomena. These criticisms were answered directly by Fauconnier.

The theory has also been criticised for unnecessary complexity. The minimal network model requires at least four mental spaces; however, David Ritchie (2004) argues that many of the proposed blends could be explained by simpler integration processes. He has also argued that some examples of blends such as the Buddhist Monk may have an alternative interpretation.

== See also ==
- Working memory
- Analogy
- Blended space
- Conceptual metaphor
- Ideasthesia
