= Construction grammar =

Family of theories within the field of cognitive linguistics

Construction grammar (often abbreviated CxG) is a family of theories within the field of cognitive linguistics which posit that constructions, or learned pairings of linguistic patterns with meanings, are the fundamental building blocks of human language. Constructions include words (aardvark, avocado), morphemes (anti-, -ing), fixed expressions and idioms (by and large, jog X's memory), and abstract grammatical rules such as the passive voice (The cat was hit by a car) or the ditransitive (Mary gave Alex the ball). Any linguistic pattern is considered to be a construction as long as some aspect of its form or its meaning cannot be predicted from its component parts, or from other constructions that are recognized to exist. In construction grammar, every utterance is understood to be a combination of multiple different constructions, which together specify its precise meaning and form.

Advocates of construction grammar argue that language and culture are not designed by people, but are 'emergent' or automatically constructed in a process which is comparable to natural selection in species or the formation of natural constructions such as nests made by social insects. Constructions correspond to replicators or memes in memetics and other cultural replicator theories. Construction grammar is associated with concepts from cognitive linguistics that aim to show in various ways how human rational and creative behaviour is automatic and not planned.

== History ==
Construction grammar was first developed in the 1980s by linguists such as Charles Fillmore, Paul Kay, and George Lakoff, in order to analyze idioms and fixed expressions. Lakoff's 1977 paper "Linguistic Gestalts" put forward an early version of CxG, arguing that the meaning of an expression was not simply a function of the meanings of its parts. Instead, he suggested, constructions themselves must have meanings.

Another early study was "There-Constructions," which appeared as Case Study 3 in George Lakoff's Women, Fire, and Dangerous Things. It argued that the meaning of the whole was not a function of the meanings of the parts, that odd grammatical properties of Deictic There-constructions followed from the pragmatic meaning of the construction, and that variations on the central construction could be seen as simple extensions using form-meaning pairs of the central construction.

Fillmore et al.'s (1988) paper on the English let alone construction was a second classic. These two papers propelled cognitive linguists into the study of CxG. Since the late 1990s there has been a shift towards a general preference for the usage-based model. The shift towards the usage-based approach in construction grammar has inspired the development of several corpus-based methodologies of constructional analysis (for example, collostructional analysis).

== Concepts ==
One of the most distinctive features of CxG is its use of multi-word expressions and phrasal patterns as the building blocks of syntactic analysis. One example is the Correlative Conditional construction, found in the proverbial expression The bigger they come, the harder they fall. Construction grammarians point out that this is not merely a fixed phrase; the Correlative Conditional is a general pattern (The Xer, the Yer) with "slots" that can be filled by almost any comparative phrase (e.g. The more you think about it, the less you understand). Advocates of CxG argue these kinds of idiosyncratic patterns are more common than is often recognized, and that they are best understood as multi-word, partially filled constructions.

Construction grammar rejects the idea that there is a sharp dichotomy between lexical items, which are arbitrary and specific, and grammatical rules, which are completely general. Instead, CxG posits that there are linguistic patterns at every level of generality and specificity: from individual words, to partially filled constructions (e.g. drive X crazy), to fully abstract rules (e.g. subject–auxiliary inversion). All of these patterns are recognized as constructions.

In contrast to theories that posit an innate universal grammar for all languages, construction grammar holds that speakers learn constructions inductively as they are exposed to them, using general cognitive processes. It is argued that children pay close attention to each utterance they hear, and gradually make generalizations based on the utterances they have heard. Because constructions are learned, they are expected to vary considerably across different languages.

=== Grammatical construction ===
In construction grammar, as in general semiotics, the grammatical construction is a pairing of form and content. The formal aspect of a construction is typically described as a syntactic template, but the form covers more than just syntax, as it also involves phonological aspects, such as prosody and intonation, sometimes in the form of prosodic constructions. The content covers semantic as well as pragmatic meaning.

The semantic meaning of a grammatical construction is made up of conceptual structures postulated in cognitive semantics: image-schemas, frames, conceptual metaphors, conceptual metonymies, prototypes of various kinds, mental spaces, and bindings across these (called "blends"). Pragmatics just becomes the cognitive semantics of communication—the modern version of the old Ross-Lakoff performative hypothesis from the 1960s.

The form and content are symbolically linked in the sense advocated by Langacker.

Thus a construction is treated like a sign in which all structural aspects are integrated parts and not distributed over different modules as they are in the componential model. Consequentially, not only constructions that are lexically fixed, like many idioms, but also more abstract ones like argument structure schemata, are pairings of form and conventionalized meaning. For instance, the ditransitive schema [S V IO DO] is said to express semantic content X CAUSES Y TO RECEIVE Z, just like kill means X CAUSES Y TO DIE.

In construction grammar, a grammatical construction, regardless of its formal or semantic complexity and make up, is a pairing of form and meaning. Thus words and word classes may be regarded as instances of constructions. Indeed, construction grammarians argue that all pairings of form and meaning are constructions, including phrase structures, idioms, words and even morphemes.

=== Syntax–lexicon continuum ===
Unlike the componential model, construction grammar denies any strict distinction between the two and proposes a syntax–lexicon continuum. The argument goes that words and complex constructions are both pairs of form and meaning and differ only in internal symbolic complexity. Instead of being discrete modules and thus subject to very different processes they form the extremes of a continuum (from regular to idiosyncratic): syntax > subcategorization frame > idiom > morphology > syntactic category > word/lexicon (these are the traditional terms; construction grammars use a different terminology).

=== Grammar as an inventory of constructions ===
In construction grammar, the grammar of a language is made up of taxonomic networks of families of constructions, which are based on the same principles as those of the conceptual categories known from cognitive linguistics, such as inheritance, prototypicality, extensions, and multiple parenting.

Four different models are proposed in relation to how information is stored in the taxonomies:

1. Full-entry model
  In the full-entry model information is stored redundantly at all relevant levels in the taxonomy, which means that it operates, if at all, with minimal generalization.
2. Usage-based model
  The usage-based model is based on inductive learning, meaning that linguistic knowledge is acquired in a bottom-up manner through use. It allows for redundancy and generalizations, because the language user generalizes over recurring experiences of use.
3. Default inheritance model
  According to the default inheritance model, each network has a default central form-meaning pairing from which all instances inherit their features. It thus operates with a fairly high level of generalization, but does also allow for some redundancy in that it recognizes extensions of different types.
4. Complete inheritance model
  In the complete inheritance model, information is stored only once at the most superordinate level of the network. Instances at all other levels inherit features from the superordinate item. The complete inheritance does not allow for redundancy in the networks.

=== Principle of no synonymy ===
Because construction grammar does not operate with surface derivations from underlying structures, it adheres to functionalist linguist Dwight Bolinger's principle of no synonymy, on which Adele Goldberg elaborates in her book.

This means that construction grammarians argue, for instance, that active and passive versions of the same proposition are not derived from an underlying structure, but are instances of two different constructions. As constructions are pairings of form and meaning, active and passive versions of the same proposition are not synonymous, but display differences in content: in this case the pragmatic content.

== Some construction grammars ==
As mentioned above, Construction grammar is a "family" of theories rather than one unified theory. There are a number of formalized Construction grammar frameworks. Some of these are:

=== Berkeley construction grammar ===
Berkeley construction grammar (BCG; formerly also called simply Construction Grammar in uppercase) focuses on the formal aspects of constructions and makes use of a unification-based framework for description of syntax, not unlike head-driven phrase structure grammar. Its proponents/developers include Charles Fillmore, Paul Kay, Laura Michaelis, and to a certain extent Ivan Sag. Immanent within BCG works like Fillmore and Kay 1995 and Michaelis and Ruppenhofer 2001 is the notion that phrasal representations—embedding relations—should not be used to represent combinatoric properties of lexemes or lexeme classes. For example, BCG abandons the traditional practice of using non-branching domination (NP over N' over N) to describe undetermined nominals that function as NPs, instead introducing a determination construction that requires ('asks for') a non-maximal nominal sister and a lexical 'maximality' feature for which plural and mass nouns are unmarked. BCG also offers a unification-based representation of 'argument structure' patterns as abstract verbal lexeme entries ('linking constructions'). These linking constructions include transitive, oblique goal and passive constructions. These constructions describe classes of verbs that combine with phrasal constructions like the VP construction but contain no phrasal information in themselves.

=== Sign-based construction grammar ===
In the mid-2000s, several of the developers of BCG, including Charles Fillmore, Paul Kay, Ivan Sag and Laura Michaelis, collaborated in an effort to improve the formal rigor of BCG and clarify its representational conventions. The result was Sign Based Construction Grammar (SBCG). SBCG is based on a multiple-inheritance hierarchy of typed feature structures. The most important type of feature structure in SBCG is the sign, with subtypes word, lexeme and phrase. The inclusion of phrase within the canon of signs marks a major departure from traditional syntactic thinking. In SBCG, phrasal signs are licensed by correspondence to the mother of some licit construct of the grammar. A construct is a local tree with signs at its nodes. Combinatorial constructions define classes of constructs. Lexical class constructions describe combinatoric and other properties common to a group of lexemes. Combinatorial constructions include both inflectional and derivational constructions. SBCG is both formal and generative; while cognitive-functional grammarians have often opposed their standards and practices to those of formal, generative grammarians, there is in fact no incompatibility between a formal, generative approach and a rich, broad-coverage, functionally based grammar. It simply happens that many formal, generative theories are descriptively inadequate grammars. SBCG is generative in a way that prevailing syntax-centered theories are not: its mechanisms are intended to represent all of the patterns of a given language, including idiomatic ones; there is no 'core' grammar in SBCG. SBCG a licensing-based theory, as opposed to one that freely generates syntactic combinations and uses general principles to bar illicit ones: a word, lexeme or phrase is well formed if and only if it is described by a lexeme or construction. Recent SBCG works have expanded on the lexicalist model of idiomatically combining expressions sketched out in Sag 2012.

=== Goldbergian/Lakovian construction grammar ===
The type of construction grammar associated with linguists like Goldberg and Lakoff looks mainly at the external relations of constructions and the structure of constructional networks. In terms of form and function, this type of construction grammar puts psychological plausibility as its highest desideratum. It emphasizes experimental results and parallels with general cognitive psychology. It also draws on certain principles of cognitive linguistics. In the Goldbergian strand, constructions interact with each other in a network via four inheritance relations: polysemy link, subpart link, metaphorical extension, and finally instance link.

=== Cognitive grammar ===
Sometimes, Ronald Langacker's cognitive grammar framework is described as a type of construction grammar. Cognitive grammar deals mainly with the semantic content of constructions, and its central argument is that conceptual semantics is primary to the degree that form mirrors, or is motivated by, content. Langacker argues that even abstract grammatical units like part-of-speech classes are semantically motivated and involve certain conceptualizations.

=== Radical construction grammar ===
William A. Croft's radical construction grammar is designed for typological purposes and takes into account cross-linguistic factors. It deals mainly with the internal structure of constructions. Radical construction grammar is totally non-reductionist, and Croft argues that constructions are not derived from their parts, but that the parts are derived from the constructions they appear in. Thus, in radical construction grammar, constructions are linked to Gestalts. Radical construction grammar rejects the idea that syntactic categories, roles, and relations are universal and argues that they are not only language-specific, but also construction specific. Thus, there are no universals that make reference to formal categories, since formal categories are language- and construction-specific. The only universals are to be found in the patterns concerning the mapping of meaning onto form. Radical construction grammar rejects the notion of syntactic relations altogether and replaces them with semantic relations. Like Goldbergian/Lakovian construction grammar and cognitive grammar, radical construction grammar is closely related to cognitive linguistics, and like cognitive grammar, radical construction grammar appears to be based on the idea that form is semantically motivated.

=== Embodied construction grammar ===
Embodied construction grammar (ECG), which is being developed by the Neural Theory of Language (NTL) group at ICSI, UC Berkeley, and the University of Hawaiʻi, particularly including Benjamin Bergen and Nancy Chang, adopts the basic constructionist definition of a grammatical construction, but emphasizes the relation of constructional semantic content to embodiment and sensorimotor experiences. A central claim is that the content of all linguistic signs involves mental simulations and is ultimately dependent on basic image schemas of the kind advocated by Mark Johnson and George Lakoff, and so ECG aligns itself with cognitive linguistics. Like construction grammar, embodied construction grammar makes use of a unification-based model of representation. A non-technical introduction to the NTL theory behind embodied construction grammar as well as the theory itself and a variety of applications can be found in Jerome Feldman's From Molecule to Metaphor: A Neural Theory of Language (MIT Press, 2006).

=== Fluid construction grammar ===
Fluid construction grammar (FCG) was designed by Luc Steels and his collaborators for doing experiments on the origins and evolution of language. FCG is a fully operational and computationally implemented formalism for construction grammars and proposes a uniform mechanism for parsing and production. Moreover, it has been demonstrated through robotic experiments that FCG grammars can be grounded in embodiment and sensorimotor experiences. FCG integrates many notions from contemporary computational linguistics such as feature structures and unification-based language processing. Constructions are considered bidirectional and hence usable both for parsing and production. Processing is flexible in the sense that it can even cope with partially ungrammatical or incomplete sentences. FCG is called 'fluid' because it acknowledges the premise that language users constantly change and update their grammars. The research on FCG is conducted at Sony CSL Paris and the AI Lab at the Vrije Universiteit Brussel.

=== Implemented construction grammar ===
Most of the above approaches to construction grammar have not been implemented as a computational model for large scale practical usage in Natural Language Processing frameworks but interest in construction grammar has been shown by more traditional computational linguists as a contrast to the current boom in more opaque deep learning models. This is largely due to the representational convenience of CxG models and their potential to integrate with current tokenizers as a perceptual layer for further processing in neurally inspired models. Approaches to integrate constructional grammar with existing Natural Language Processing frameworks include hand-built feature sets and templates and used computational models to identify their prevalence in text collections, but some suggestions for more emergent models have been proposed, e.g. in the 2023 Georgetown University Roundtable on Linguistics.

== See also ==
- Anankastic conditional
- Construction morphology
- Prosodic construction
- Snowclone
