= Ronald Langacker =

American linguist

- Born: Ronald Wayne Langacker; December 27, 1942 (age 83); Fond du Lac, Wisconsin
- Known for: cognitive linguistics, cognitive grammar, comparative study of Uto-Aztecan languages

Academic background
- Education: University of Illinois at Urbana–Champaign

Ronald Wayne Langacker (born December 27, 1942) is an American linguist and professor emeritus at the University of California, San Diego. He is best known as one of the founders of the cognitive linguistics movement and the creator of cognitive grammar. He has also made significant contributions to the comparative study of Uto-Aztecan languages, publishing several articles on historical Uto-Aztecan linguistics, as well as editing collections of grammar sketches of under-described Uto-Aztecan languages.

== Life ==
Born in Fond du Lac, Wisconsin, Langacker received his Ph.D. from the University of Illinois at Urbana–Champaign in 1966. From 1966 until 2003, he was professor of linguistics at the University of California, San Diego. From 1997 until 1999 he also served as president of the International Cognitive Linguistics Association.

== Career ==
Langacker develops the central ideas of cognitive grammar in his seminal, two-volume Foundations of Cognitive Grammar, which became a major departure point for the emerging field of cognitive linguistics. Cognitive grammar treats human languages as consisting solely of semantic units, phonological units, and symbolic units (conventional pairings of phonological and semantic units). Like construction grammar, and unlike many mainstream linguistic theories, cognitive grammar extends the notion of symbolic units to the grammar of languages. Langacker further assumes that linguistic structures are motivated by general cognitive processes. In formulating his theory, he makes extensive use of principles of gestalt psychology and draws analogies between linguistic structure and aspects of visual perception.

== Partial bibliography ==
- Foundations of Cognitive Grammar, Volume I, Theoretical Prerequisites. Ronald W. Langacker. Stanford, California: Stanford University Press, 1987. ISBN 0-8047-1261-1.
- Concept, Image, and Symbol: The Cognitive Basis of Grammar. Ronald W. Langacker. Berlin & New York: Mouton de Gruyter, 1991. ISBN 3-11-012863-2, ISBN 0-89925-820-4.
- Foundations of Cognitive Grammar, Volume II, Descriptive Application. Ronald W. Langacker. Stanford, California: Stanford University Press, 1991. ISBN 0-8047-1909-8.
- Grammar and Conceptualization. Ronald W. Langacker. Berlin & New York: Mouton de Gruyter, 1999. ISBN 3-11-016603-8.
- Cognitive Grammar: A Basic Introduction. Ronald W. Langacker. New York: Oxford University Press, 2008. ISBN 978-0-19-533196-7.
- Investigations in Cognitive Grammar (Cognitive Linguistics Research) Ronald W. Langacker. Berlin & New York: Mouton de Gruyter, July 15, 2009 ISBN 978-3-11-021434-5

== Quotes/examples ==
- "After I ran over the cat with our car, there was cat all over the driveway." (Concept, Image, and Symbol: The Cognitive Basis of Grammar, p. 73)
- "I can think of a unicorn with daisies growing out of its nostrils, but I don't need a name for it."

== Relevant literature ==
- Bennet, Phil. 2014. "Langacker’s cognitive grammar." The Bloomsbury Companion to Cognitive Linguistics, ed. by Littlemore, Jeannette, and John R. Taylor, eds., 29-48. Bloomsbury Publishing
