= Cognitive linguistics =

Discipline combining linguistics, psychology and cognitive science

Cognitive linguistics is an approach to the study of language that encompasses a number of complementary and sometimes overlapping theories. Their defining characteristic is the guiding assumption that linguistic patterns are patterns of conceptualization. Thus, cognitive linguists consider that the study of language provides insight into other human cognitive functions and vice-versa. In this regard, cognitive linguistics challenges generative grammar's hypothesis that some basic linguistic competence is innate and separate from other cognitive faculties. It also objects to truth-conditional semantics's notion that linguistic meaning can be understood in terms of the truth or falsity of a sentence in relation to an external reality.

Cognitive linguistic theories include George Lakoff and Mark Johnson's conceptual metaphor theory (CMT), Ronald Langacker's cognitive grammar, Charles Fillmore's frame semantics, Leonard Talmy's force dynamics, and Gilles Fauconnier and Mark Turner's conceptual blending.

== Basic principles ==
Cognitive linguistic research shares a set of common principles, commitments or hypotheses about language. The exact number and nature of these varies across authors. However, they share much in common and are in broad agreement with each other. This section presents an integrated version of the basic principles covered in popular textbooks and handbooks.

=== Two main commitments ===
Research in cognitive linguistics follows two main commitments: the generalization commitment and the cognitive commitment.

==== The generalization commitment ====
Cognitive linguistics looks for linguistic principles that apply across all domains of linguistic structure. Traditionally, linguistics has separated the study of language into different areas. For example, morphology is devoted to word structure, syntax investigates how sentences are constructed and semantics is devoted to the study of linguistic meaning. Cognitive linguistic theories recognize and work with these specific areas of linguistics, but they do not imply that these subdivisions represent the cognitive processes that underpin language. Instead, cognitive linguistics emphasizes that, since the primary function of language is to convey meaning, all linguistic domains are involved in semantics.

Cognitive linguistics approach to polysemy is an example of the generalization commitment in action. Traditionally, this phenomenon was considered to be exclusively a matter of lexicography. However, not only words can be polysemous; parts of words like prefixes and suffixes, which are commonly studied in morphology, can have multiple meanings too. Take for example the meaning of the suffix -er in the following list:

  1. lawyer
  2. New Yorker
  3. hair dryer
  4. keeper

In each case, the suffix -er denotes a different semantic role. In 1a it indicates the noun is an AGENT; that is, someone who carries out an action. In 1b it signifies the ORIGIN or place of residence of the noun. In 1c it means that the noun is an INSTRUMENT that serves that specific function. Finally in 1d it is polysemous; it could indicate that the noun is an active AGENT like in 1a, as in "I am my brother's keeper" or it could mean that it is a PATIENT or target of an action as in "She is a keeper". As this example shows, polysemy is not limited to whole words, but instead it generalizes to morphemes. Cognitive linguists argue that this is not an isolated phenomenon and is not exclusive to polysemy, but a general feature of language.

==== The cognitive commitment ====
Cognitive linguistic approaches are committed to the principle that linguistic structure should reflect general cognitive principles not specific to language. This contrasts with the research program outlined by Noam Chomsky for generative grammar, which proposes a universal grammar, a set of cognitive functions specific to language. Both traditions engage with the broader field of cognitive science such as cognitive psychology, cognitive neuroscience, artificial intelligence, anthropology and philosophy, but they differ in their expectations: generative approaches seek evidence of a dedicated language module, while cognitive linguistic approaches expect linguistic abilities to emerge from domain-general cognitive capacities (e.g. categorization, analogy, perceptual experience).

The cognitive commitment is exemplified in how attention, a basic cognitive ability, is involved in the process of linguistic profiling. For instance, a scene can be verbally described in many different ways. Each one is able to profile different aspects of it by changing the focus of attention by means of its linguistic structure. Consider the following sentences:

  1. The pilot crashed the race car.
  2. The race car crashed.
  3. The race car crashed into pieces.
  4. The race car is in pieces.

Assuming all of them describe the same scene, ie. share the same referent, it is clear that each one is emphasizing a different aspect of it. In 2a there is an AGENT, the pilot, and a PATIENT, the race car. This is active profiling since the entire action is being brought to attention. In contrast, 2b is passive profiling where the PATIENT is brought to the fore by taking the place of the subject while the AGENT is omitted. In 2c a change of state is being profiled by the syntactic structure subject-verb-complement, where the complement is profiled as a consequence of the verb. Finally, in 2d the state of the PATIENT is being profiled without reference to the action or the AGENT that brought about that change.

=== Linguistic meaning ===
Because of its commitment to general cognitive principles that apply across all linguistic structures, cognitive linguistics holds the view that linguistic meaning is non-autonomous, perspectival, experiential and dynamic.

- Language is not autonomous – the human mind requires of a host of cognitive functions to develop and use language and there is no cognitive faculty that is properly and exclusively linguistic. Linguistic meaning is encyclopedic as opposed to dictionary-like (especially in the sense that is used in computer science). Words and other linguistic expressions are not paired to their meanings in one-to-one or even one-to-many mappings, but rather linguistic meaning is constructed by drawing from a complex network of knowledge domains that are related to each other through experience.
- Language is experiential – knowledge of language emerges from language use. Therefore, the process of language acquisition happens alongside living in a world with other language users. Taking this into account, some cognitive linguists like G. Lakoff and M. Johnson are particularly influenced by phenomenology, especially of Maurice Merleau-Ponty.
- Language is perspectival – linguistic meaning does not mirror the world; it mirrors the speaker's construal of the world. Grammar is conceptualization; thus structuring a sentence in a particular way is also conceptualizing it in such way.
- Language is dynamic – meaning is not static; it is flexible and adapts to changes in the world and so should linguistic theories.

=== The embodiment thesis ===
Cognitive linguistics subscribes to the paradigm in cognitive science known as embodied cognition. It views thinking as the product of an organism interacting with its environment. Hence, the body shapes the way an organism thinks. To illustrate how this applies to the study of linguistic structures, consider the following idiomatic sentences:

- The girls were in high spirits after their team won.
- The server is up and running.
- I'm down on my luck until I find another gig.
- He hasn't been able to get back on his feet since the divorce.

Analyzed through the perspective of conceptual metaphor theory, what all these examples have in common is that they map the notion of verticality onto positive and negative valence. Concretely, the first two instantiate examples of the orientational metaphor UP is GOOD and the last two of its complement, DOWN is BAD. Thinking this way makes sense for an upright walking organism with most of its sense organs located near its apical end. Given this bodily configuration, an active and favorable physical state will be generally connected with the experience of being upright and being at rest or ill will be more readily associated with lying down. In this way, the basic and concrete experience of existing in space as a human being constitutes the basic conceptual scaffolding for thinking of more abstract and complex subjects.

The embodiment thesis brings forward deeper epistemological implications. The body is not only the means by which an organism interacts (and therefore thinks) with the world; having a body brings a lived world into existence. Enactivism is the philosophical position in cognitive science that argues that the lived world is enacted or brought forward through the natural history of a species interacting with its environment. Enactivism is opposed to cognitivism, a school of thought in psychology that argues that thinking is the manipulation of symbols, understood as abstract representations of a world external and independent from the organism. It is also somewhat critical of connectionism, a paradigm that describes cognition as an emergent behavior of information networks, because it ignores or downplays the importance of considering the embodiment of such networks.

From an enactivist perspective, there is no external reality that language must or even can represent. Linguistic structure is not a mirror of a reality independent of the species that creates it, but a part of the long evolutionary history of the biological, cognitive and social structural couplings of the species with its environment.

=== The relationship between grammar and semantics ===
Cognitive linguistics is divided into two main research areas: cognitive semantics and cognitive approaches to grammar. Unlike other linguistic approaches where these two aspects of language are regarded as independent areas of linguistic research, cognitive linguistics treats the distinction between grammar and semantics as the difference between two separate but complementary research programs and not as a distinction about language itself. Cognitive semantics studies how patterns in language map onto conceptual structures and, in turn, how these come from embodied experience. Prominent theories in this field include conceptual metaphor theory, conceptual blending and prototype theory. In turn, cognitive approaches to grammar study the language system itself. The two most well-known cognitive approaches to grammar are cognitive grammar and construction grammars.

== History ==
The groundwork for cognitive linguistics began in the 1970s as linguists developed meaning-centered approaches to language, pushing back against Chomsky's syntax-focused generative grammar. During this time, functional linguistics developed in parallel with comparable aims to cognitive linguistics. Researchers in language acquisition, influenced by Piaget, further contributed a functional/cognitive approach to language learning which influenced cognitive linguistics.

Throughout the 1980s individual frameworks matured. Fillmore developed Frame Semantics, and worked with others to produce Construction Grammar. Lakoff continued work on metaphor and metonymy. Langacker's ideas developed into Cognitive Grammar. Talmy published papers on how language provides frameworks for constructing mental representations. Gilles Fauconnier, influenced by Oswald Ducrot, introduced the construct of a mental space. He later worked with Mark Turner to further this into the theory of conceptual blending. The 1980s also saw the emergence of connectionist models of language processing, such as those developed by Jeff Elman and Brian MacWhinney. In 1989, the first International Cognitive Linguistics Conference was held in Duisburg, Germany. During this conference, the founding of the International Cognitive Linguistics Association (ICLA) was decided.

In 1990, the journal Cognitive Linguistics launched. During the 1990s cognitive linguistics became recognized as a field of specialization within linguistics, and further spread to Korea, Hungary, Thailand, Croatia, and other nations.

== See also ==
- Cognitive semiotics
- Natural Language Processing
- Neurolinguistics
- Psycholinguistics
- Embodied cognition
- Spanish Cognitive Linguistics Association
- Theory of language
- Usage-based models of language
