= Gilles Fauconnier =

French scientist (1944–2021)

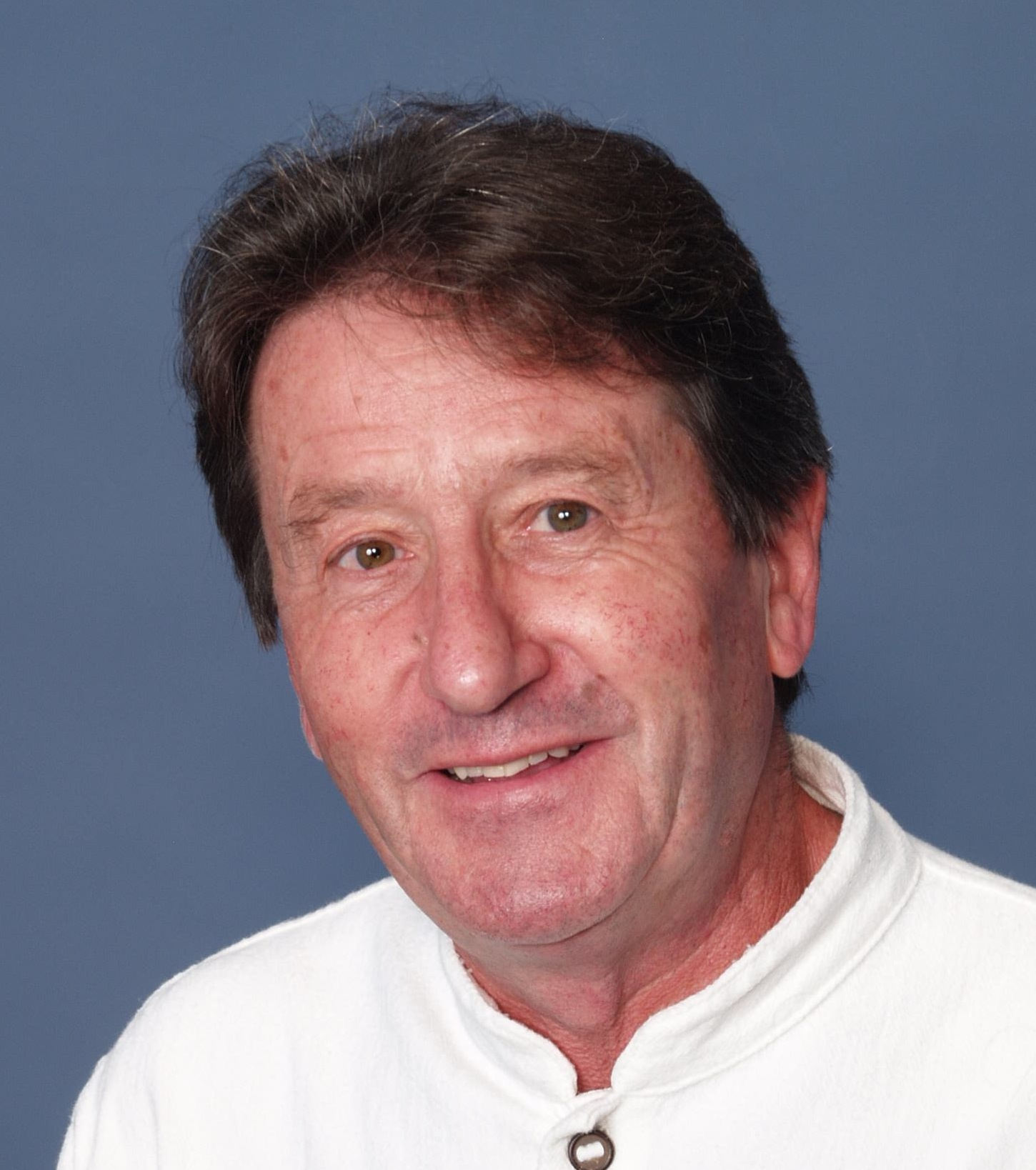
- Born: 19 August 1944
- Died: 3 February 2021 (aged 76)

Academic background
- Doctoral advisor: S.Y. Kuroda

Academic work
- Discipline: cognitive science, linguistics
- Institutions: UC San Diego

Gilles Fauconnier (French pronunciation: [ʒil fokɔˈnje]) (19 August 1944 in Vannes – 3 February 2021 in San Diego) was a French linguist, researcher in cognitive science, and author who was distinguished professor at the University of California, San Diego, in the Department of Cognitive Science. His work with Mark Turner founded the theory of conceptual blending.

His books include:

- The Way We Think: Conceptual Blending and the Mind's Hidden Complexities (with Mark Turner) (2003)
- Conceptual Integration Networks (with Mark Turner) (1998)
- Mappings in Thought and Language (1997)
- Mental Spaces: Aspects of Meaning Construction in Natural Language (1994)

== See also ==
- Cognitive science
- Conceptual blending
