= Cognitive grammar =

Linguistic theory

Cognitive grammar is a cognitive approach to language developed by Ronald Langacker, which hypothesizes that grammar, semantics, and lexicon exist on a continuum instead of as separate processes altogether. This approach to language was one of the first projects of cognitive linguistics. In this system, grammar is not a formal system operating independently of meaning. Rather, grammar is itself meaningful and inextricable from semantics.

Construction grammar is a similar focus of cognitive approaches to grammar. While cognitive grammar emphasizes the study of the cognitive principles that give rise to linguistic organization, construction grammar aims to provide a more descriptively and formally detailed account of the linguistic units that comprise a particular language.

Langacker first explicates the system of cognitive grammar in his seminal, two-volume work Foundations of Cognitive Grammar. Volume one is titled "Theoretical Prerequisites", and it explores Langacker's hypothesis that grammar may be deconstructed into patterns that come together in order to represent concepts. This volume concentrates on the broad scope of language especially in terms of the relationship between grammar and semantics. Volume two is titled "Descriptive Application", as it moves beyond the first volume to elaborate on the ways in which Langacker's previously described theories may be applied. Langacker invites his reader to utilize the tools presented in the first volume of Foundations in a wide range of, mainly English, grammatical situations.

== Theory ==
Cognitive grammar is unorthodox with respect to generative grammars and American structuralism. It primarily diverges from Chomskyan tradition through its assertion that grammar and language are integral and essential parts of cognition, not merely autonomous processes in the brain. Langacker argues not only that cognitive grammar is natural by virtue of its psychological plausibility, but also that it offers conceptual unification and theoretical austerity. It considers the basic units of language to be symbols (i.e. conventional pairings of a semantic structure with a phonological label). Grammar consists of constraints on how these units can be combined to generate larger phrases. The semantic aspects of cognitive grammar are modeled as image schemas rather than propositions, although these schema are only demonstrative, and are not intended to reflect any actual visual operation occurring during the production and perception of language. A consequence of the interrelation between semantic structure and phonological label is that each can invoke the other.

== See also ==
- Gestalt psychology
- Ronald Langacker
- Cognitive linguistics
- George Lakoff
