= Conceptual metaphor =

In cognitive linguistics, relating conceptual domains

In cognitive linguistics, conceptual metaphor, or cognitive metaphor, is the understanding of one idea, or conceptual domain, in terms of another. An example of this is the understanding of quantity in terms of directionality (e.g. "the price of peace is rising") or the understanding of time in terms of money (e.g. "I spent time at work today").

A conceptual domain can be any mental organization of human experience. The regularity with which different languages employ the same metaphors, often perceptually based, has led to the hypothesis that the mapping between conceptual domains corresponds to neural mappings in the brain. This theory gained wide attention in the 1990s and early 2000s, although some researchers question its empirical accuracy.

The conceptual metaphor theory proposed by George Lakoff and his colleagues arose from linguistics but became of interest to cognitive scientists due to its claims about the mind, the brain and their connections to the body. There is empirical evidence supporting the claim that at least some metaphors are conceptual. However, the empirical evidence for some aspects of the theory has been mixed. It is generally agreed that metaphors form an important part of human verbal conceptualization, but there is disagreement about the more specific claims conceptual metaphor theory makes about metaphor comprehension. For instance, metaphoric expressions of the form X is a Y (e.g. My job is a jail) may not activate conceptual mappings in the same way that other metaphoric expressions do. Furthermore, evidence suggests that the links between the body and conceptual metaphor, while present, may not be as extreme as some conceptual metaphor theorists have suggested.

Furthermore, certain claims from early conceptual metaphor theory have not been borne out. For instance, Lakoff asserted that human metaphorical thinking seems to work effortlessly, but psychological research on comprehension (as opposed, for example, to invention) has found that metaphors are actually more difficult to process than non-metaphoric expressions. Furthermore, when metaphors lose their novelty and become conventionalized, they eventually lose their status as metaphors and become processed like ordinary words (an instance of grammaticalization). Therefore, the role of the conceptual metaphor in processing human thinking is more limited than what was claimed by some linguistic theories.

== Background ==
The idea of conceptual metaphors as being the basis of rational thinking, and a detailed examination of the underlying processes, was first extensively explored by George Lakoff and Mark Johnson in their work Metaphors We Live By in 1980. Since then, the field of metaphor studies within the larger discipline of cognitive linguistics has increasingly developed, with several annual academic conferences, scholarly societies, and research labs contributing to the subject area. Some researchers, such as Gerard Steen, have worked to develop empirical investigative tools for metaphor research, including the Metaphor Identification Procedure, or MIP. In Psychology, Raymond W. Gibbs Jr., has investigated conceptual metaphor and embodiment through a number of psychological experiments. Other cognitive scientists, for example Gilles Fauconnier, study subjects similar to conceptual metaphor under the labels "analogy", "conceptual blending" and "ideasthesia".

Conceptual metaphors are useful for understanding complex ideas in simple terms and therefore are frequently used to give insight to abstract theories and models. For example, the conceptual metaphor of viewing communication as a conduit is one large theory explained with a metaphor. So not only is our everyday communication shaped by the language of conceptual metaphors, but so is the very way we understand scholarly theories. These metaphors are prevalent in communication and we do not just use them in language; we actually perceive and act in accordance with the metaphors.

== Criticism and perspectives ==
=== Historical ===
In the Western philosophical tradition, Aristotle is often situated as the first commentator on the nature of metaphor, writing in the Poetics, "A 'metaphorical term' involves the transferred use of a term that properly belongs to something else," and elsewhere in the Rhetoric he says that metaphors make learning pleasant; "To learn easily is naturally pleasant to all people, and words signify something, so whatever words create knowledge in us are the pleasantest." Aristotle's writings on metaphor constitute a "substitution view" of metaphor, wherein a metaphor is simply a decorative word or phrase substituted for a more ordinary one. This has been sometimes called the "Traditional View of Metaphor" and at other times the "Classical Theory of Metaphor". Later in the first century A.D., the Roman rhetorician Quintilian builds upon Aristotle's earlier work of metaphor by focusing more on the comparative function of metaphorical language. In his work Institutio Oratoria, Quintilian states," In totum autem metaphora brevior est similitudo" or "on the whole, metaphor is a shorter form of simile". Other philosophers throughout history have lent their perspectives to the discussion of metaphor as well. Friedrich Nietzsche for example, claimed that language as a whole did not portray reality but instead made a series of bold metaphors. Nietzsche believed that each step of cognition, the transfer of real world information to nerve stimuli, the culmination of nerve stimuli into mental images, the translation of mental images to words, was metaphorical. Modern interpretations of these early theories have also been intensely debated. Janet Soskice, Professor of Philosophical Theology at the University of Cambridge, writes in summary that "it is certain that we shall taste the freshness of their insights only if we free them from the obligation to answer questions that were never theirs to ask". George Lakoff and Mark Johnson, although originally taking a hard-line interpretation of these early authors later concede that Aristotle was working within a different philosophical framework from what we engage with today and that critical interpretations should take this in to account.

=== Modern ===
In his 2007 book The Stuff of Thought, cognitive scientist Steven Pinker lays out several useful classifications for the study of conceptual metaphor. Pinker first contrasts two perspectives on metaphor, what he calls the killjoy theory and the messianic theory. The killjoy theory categorizes metaphors as "dead", that is it asserts that modern day speakers are not aware of the comparison made between source and target domains in the everyday metaphors they use. For example, many are not cognizant that the phrase "to come to a head" refers to the accumulation of pus in a pimple. In contrast, the messianic theory correlates more closely with Lakoff and Johnson's idea of a conceptual metaphor (Lakoff and Johnson indeed do however recognize "dead metaphors"). This view states that users of metaphors are aware of how the metaphor maps onto the domains and use them to relate shared perceptual experiences to more complex thoughts.

Another important distinction made by Pinker is that between literary, or poetic metaphors, and conceptual, or generative metaphors. Poetic metaphors are used for a variety of reasons but ultimately highlight similarities or incongruencies in an expressive manner. Pinker's example of this being the classic Shakespearian line "Juliet is the sun". These metaphors can often appear convoluted or unclear without deeper context. Conceptual metaphors result from some inherent relation between two domains. These metaphors, so innate they are considered cliche, are interestingly able to generate infinite new metaphors. For example, thinking back on the conceptual metaphor ARGUMENT IS WAR, one can build many new metaphors such as "I shot him down" or "he blew my argument to pieces".

Pinker himself settles on a moderate view that falls in between the messianic and killjoy theories on metaphor. Perhaps most interestingly, while Pinker concedes that metaphor is a useful way to combat the limited ability of language to express thought, he postulates that a higher level of abstract thought must still be present. Otherwise, Pinker points out, how could we engage in critique of metaphors or employ metaphors for comedic effect?

Major criticisms of work done on conceptual metaphor stem from the way many researchers conduct their research. Many study metaphors in a "top-down" direction, looking first at a few examples to suggest conceptual metaphors, then examining the structure of those metaphors. Researchers would look at their own lexicon, dictionaries, thesauri, and other corpora to study metaphors in language. Critics say this ignored the way language was actually used and focused too much on the hypothetical metaphors, so many irregularities were overlooked in favor of postulating universal conceptual metaphors. In 2007, Pragglejaz Group came up with a methodology for identifying metaphorical expressions as a response to these criticisms.

== Mappings ==
There are two main roles for the conceptual domains posited in conceptual metaphors:

- Source domain: the conceptual domain from which we draw metaphorical expressions (e.g., love is a journey).
- Target domain: the conceptual domain that we try to understand (e.g., love is a journey).

A mapping is the way in which a source domain tracks onto and describes aspects of the target domain. Mappings describe the mental organization of information in domains, the underlying phenomenon that drives metaphorical usage in language. This conceptualization relates closely to image schemas, mental representations used in reasoning, through the extension of spatial and physical laws to more complex situations.

A primary tenet of this theory is that metaphors are matter of thought and not merely of language: hence, the term conceptual metaphor. The metaphor may seem to consist of words or other linguistic expressions that come from the terminology of the more concrete conceptual domain, but conceptual metaphors underlie a system of related metaphorical expressions that appear on the linguistic surface. Similarly, the mappings of a conceptual metaphor are themselves motivated by image schemas which are pre-linguistic schemas concerning space, time, moving, controlling, and other core elements of embodied human experience.

Conceptual metaphors typically employ a more abstract concept as target and a more concrete or physical concept as their source. For instance, metaphors such as 'the days [the more abstract or target concept] ahead' or 'giving my time' rely on more concrete concepts, thus expressing time as a path into physical space, or as a substance that can be handled and offered as a gift. Different conceptual metaphors tend to be invoked when the speaker is trying to make a case for a certain point of view or course of action. For instance, one might associate "the days ahead" with leadership, whereas the phrase "giving my time" carries stronger connotations of bargaining. Selection of such metaphors tends to be directed by a subconscious or implicit habit in the mind of the person employing them.

The principle of unidirectionality states that the metaphorical process typically goes from the more concrete to the more abstract, and not the other way around. Accordingly, abstract concepts are understood in terms of prototype concrete processes. The term "concrete," in this theory, has been further specified by Lakoff and Johnson as more closely related to the developmental, physical neural, and interactive body (see embodied philosophy). One manifestation of this view is found in the cognitive science of mathematics, where it is proposed that mathematics itself, the most widely accepted means of abstraction in the human community, is largely metaphorically constructed, and thereby reflects a cognitive bias unique to humans that uses embodied prototypical processes (e.g. counting, moving along a path) that are understood by all human beings through their experiences.

== Conduit metaphor ==
The conduit metaphor is a dominant class of figurative expressions used when discussing communication itself (metalanguage). It operates whenever people speak or write as if they "insert" their mental contents (feelings, meanings, thoughts, concepts, etc.) into "containers" (words, phrases, sentences, etc.) whose contents are then "extracted" by listeners and readers. Thus, language is viewed as a "conduit" conveying mental content between people.

Defined and described by linguist Michael J. Reddy, PhD, his proposal of this conceptual metaphor refocused debate within and outside the linguistic community on the importance of metaphorical language.

== Language and culture as mappings ==
In their 1980 work, Lakoff and Johnson closely examined a collection of basic conceptual metaphors, including:

- love is a journey
- life is a journey
- social organizations are plants
- love is war

The latter half of each of these phrases invokes certain assumptions about concrete experience and requires the reader or listener to apply them to the preceding abstract concepts of love or organizing in order to understand the sentence in which the conceptual metaphor is used.

There are numerous ways in which conceptual metaphors shape human perception and communication, especially in mass media and in public policy. Recent experiments by Thibodeau and Boroditsky substantiate this line of thought, termed "framing". In the experiments, conceptual metaphors that compared crime to either a beast or a disease had drastic effects on public policy opinions.

Conceptual metaphors are commonplace in language. George Lakoff and Mark Johnson suggest that metaphors may unconsciously shape the way we think and act in their founding work, Metaphors We Live By (1980). For example, take the commonly used conceptual metaphor, argument is war. This metaphor shapes our language in the way we view argument as a battle to be won. It is not uncommon to hear someone say "He won that argument" or "I attacked every weak point in his argument". The very way argument is conceptualized is shaped by this metaphor of arguments being a war. Argument can be seen in other ways than a battle, but we use this concept to shape the way we think of argument and the way we go about arguing. The same applies for the other conceptual metaphors.

Similarly, Colin Murray Turbayne suggested in his The Myth of Metaphor (1962) that ancient "dead metaphors" have also influenced the evolution over time of modern scientific theories in a subtle manner. As examples of mankind's victimization by dead metaphors, Turbayne points to the incorporation of mechanistic metaphors first developed by Isaac Newton and René Descartes into modern theories developed by philosophers including Immanuel Kant, George Berkeley and David Hume. In his Metaphors for the Mind: The Creative Mind and Its Origins (1991), he also points to the manner in which metaphors first found in Plato's Timaeus have exerted a profound influence upon the development of modern theories of both thought and language in general.

Lakoff and Johnson focus on English, and cognitive scholars writing in English have tended not to investigate the discourse of foreign languages in any great detail to determine the creative ways in which individuals negotiate, resist, and consolidate conceptual metaphors. Andrew Goatly in his book Washing the Brain (2007) considers ideological conceptual metaphors as well as Chinese conceptual metaphors.

James W. Underhill, a modern Humboldtian scholar, attempts to reestablish Wilhelm von Humboldt's concern for the different ways languages frame reality, and the strategies individuals adopt in creatively resisting and modifying existing patterns of thought. Taking on board the Lakoff-Johnson paradigm of conceptual metaphor, he investigates the way in which Czech communists appropriated the concept of the people, the state and struggle, and the way German Communists harnessed concepts of eternity and purity. He also reminds us that, as Klemperer demonstrates, resisting patterns of thought means engaging in conceptual metaphors and refusing the logic that ideologies impose upon them. In multilingual studies (based on Czech, German, French & English), Underhill considers how different cultures reformulate key concepts such as truth, love, hate and war.

== Family roles and ethics ==
George Lakoff makes similar claims on the overlap of conceptual metaphors, culture, and society in his book Moral Politics and his later book on framing, Don't Think of an Elephant!. Lakoff claims that the public political arena in America reflects a basic conceptual metaphor of 'the family.' Accordingly, people understand political leaders in terms of 'strict father' and 'nurturant mother' roles. Two basic views of political economy arise from this desire to see the nation-state act 'more like a father' or 'more like a mother.' He further amplified these views in his latest book, The Political Mind.

Urban theorist and ethicist Jane Jacobs made this distinction in less gender-driven terms by differentiating between a 'Guardian Ethic' and a 'Trader Ethic'. She states that guarding and trading are two concrete activities that human beings must learn to apply metaphorically to all choices in later life. In a society where guarding children is the primary female duty and trading in a market economy is the primary male duty, Lakoff posits that children assign the 'guardian' and 'trader' roles to their mothers and fathers, respectively.

== Linguistics and politics ==
Lakoff, Johnson, and Pinker are among the many cognitive scientists that devote a significant amount of time to current events and political theory, suggesting that respected linguists and theorists of conceptual metaphor may tend to channel their theories into political realms.

Critics of this ethics-driven approach to language tend to accept that idioms reflect underlying conceptual metaphors, but that actual grammar, and the more basic cross-cultural concepts of scientific method and mathematical practice tend to minimize the impact of metaphors. Such critics tend to see Lakoff and Jacobs as 'left-wing figures,' and would not accept their politics as any kind of crusade against an ontology embedded in language and culture, but rather, as an idiosyncratic pastime, not part of the science of linguistics nor of much use. And others further, such as Deleuze and Guattari, Michel Foucault and, more recently, Manuel de Landa would criticize both of these two positions for mutually constituting the same old ontological ideology that would try to separate two parts of a whole that is greater than the sum of its parts.

Lakoff's 1987 work, Women, Fire, and Dangerous Things, answered some of these criticisms before they were even made: he explores the effects of cognitive metaphors (both culturally specific and human-universal) on the grammar per se of several languages, and the evidence of the limitations of the classical logical-positivist or Anglo-American School philosophical concept of the category usually used to explain or describe the scientific method. Lakoff's reliance on empirical scientific evidence, i.e. specifically falsifiable predictions, in the 1987 work and in Philosophy in the Flesh (1999) suggests that the cognitive-metaphor position has no objections to the scientific method, but instead considers the scientific method a finely developed reasoning system used to discover phenomena which are subsequently understood in terms of new conceptual metaphors (such as the metaphor of fluid motion for conducted electricity, which is described in terms of "current" "flowing" against "impedance," or the gravitational metaphor for static-electric phenomena, or the "planetary orbit" model of the atomic nucleus and electrons, as used by Niels Bohr).

Further, partly in response to such criticisms, Lakoff and Rafael E. Núñez, in 2000, proposed a cognitive science of mathematics that would explain mathematics as a consequence of, not an alternative to, the human reliance on conceptual metaphor to understand abstraction in terms of basic experiential concretes.

== Literature ==
The Linguistic Society of America has argued that "the most recent linguistic approach to literature is that of cognitive metaphor, which claims that metaphor is not a mode of language, but a mode of thought. Metaphors project structures from source domains of schematized bodily or enculturated experience into abstract target domains. We conceive the abstract idea of life in terms of our experiences of a journey, a year, or a day. We do not understand Robert Frost's 'Stopping by Woods on a Snowy Evening' to be about a horse-and-wagon journey but about life. We understand Emily Dickinson's 'Because I could not stop for Death' as a poem about the end of the human life span, not a trip in a carriage. This work is redefining the critical notion of imagery. Perhaps for this reason, cognitive metaphor has significant promise for some kind of rapprochement between linguistics and literary study."

== Education ==
Teaching thinking by analogy (metaphor) is one of the main themes of The Private Eye Project. The idea of encouraging use of conceptual metaphors can also be seen in other educational programs touting the cultivation of "critical thinking skills".

The work of political scientist Rūta Kazlauskaitė examines metaphorical models in school-history knowledge of the controversial Polish-Lithuanian past. On the basis of Lakoff and Johnson's conceptual metaphor theory, she shows how the implicit metaphorical models of everyday experience, which inform the abstract conceptualization of the past, truth, objectivity, knowledge, and multiperspectivity in the school textbooks, obstruct an understanding of the divergent narratives of past experience.

== Language learning ==
There is some evidence that an understanding of underlying conceptual metaphors can aid the retention of vocabulary for people learning a foreign language. To improve learners' awareness of conceptual metaphor, one monolingual learner's dictionary, the Macmillan English Dictionary has introduced 50 or so 'metaphor boxes' covering the most salient Lakoffian metaphors in English. For example, the dictionary entry for conversation includes a box with the heading: 'A conversation is like a journey, with the speakers going from one place to another', followed by vocabulary items (words and phrases) which embody this metaphorical schema. Language teaching experts are beginning to explore the relevance of conceptual metaphor to how learners learn and what teachers do in the classroom.

== Mapping in animals ==
A current study showed a natural tendency to systematically map an abstract dimension, such as social status, in our closest and non-linguistic relatives, the chimpanzees. In detail, discrimination performances between familiar conspecific faces were systematically modulated by the spatial location and the social status of the presented individuals, leading to discrimination facilitation or deterioration. High-ranked individuals presented at spatially higher position and low-ranked individuals presented at lower position led to discrimination facilitation, while high-ranked individuals at lower positions and low-ranked individuals at higher position led to discrimination deterioration. This suggests that this tendency had already evolved in the common ancestors of humans and chimpanzees and is not uniquely human, but describes a conceptual metaphorical mapping that predates language.

== See also ==
- Analogy
- Cognitive science of mathematics
- Concept map
- Conceptual blending
- Embodied philosophy
- Ideasthesia
- Image schema
- Invariance principle
- Language acquisition
- Linguistic relativity
- Metaphor
- Metaphorical framing
- Ontology
- Origins of language
- Propaganda
- Scale-free networks
- Thought experiment
