= Primary metaphor =

In cognitive linguistics, a primary metaphor is an ingrained association between certain pairs of distinct concepts. These innate conceptual metaphors inform cognition, and are theorised to arise unconsciously from experienced events which can form "pre-metaphor" patterns. Primary metaphors persist across different languages because basic embodied experiences, which form their basis, are universal.

In these associated pairs of concepts, one can be said to be the "source" concept, which is usually grounded in a measurable experience, while the other is the "target" concept, which is usually more abstract and subjective. They may arise via conflation during early development, before the subject is able to distinguish the two concepts.

One example is the association of "heaviness" with "difficulty". Likewise, there is a correlation between knowing and seeing forming the primary metaphor knowing is seeing. Understanding an expression such as glass ceiling rests on two such primary metaphors.

Evidence for primary metaphors is usually observed in the use of language, though evidence from the visual domain has also been researched.

The term primary metaphor was coined by linguist Joseph Grady.

== See also ==
- Conceptual blending
- Invariance principle
- George Lakoff
- Embodied cognition
