= Conduit metaphor =

Class of figurative expressions used when discussing communication

In linguistics, the conduit metaphor is a dominant class of figurative expressions invoked when linguists discuss communication itself (metalanguage). It operates whenever people speak or write as if they "insert" their mental contents (feelings, meanings, thoughts, concepts, etc.) into "containers" (words, phrases, sentences, etc.) whose contents are then "extracted" by listeners and readers. Thus, in this model, language is viewed as a "conduit" conveying mental content between people.

The conduit metaphor was first defined and described by linguist Michael J. Reddy in 1979. Reddy's proposal of this conceptual metaphor refocused debate within and outside the linguistic community on the importance of metaphorical language.

Fellow linguist George Lakoff stated:

"The contemporary theory that metaphor is primarily conceptual, conventional, and part of the ordinary system of thought and language can be traced to Michael Reddy's now classic essay... With a single, thoroughly analyzed example, he allowed us to see, albeit in a restricted domain, that ordinary everyday English is largely metaphorical, dispelling once and for all the traditional view that metaphor is primarily in the realm of poetic or 'figurative' language. Reddy showed, for a single, very significant case, that the locus of metaphor is thought, not language, that metaphor is a major and indispensable part of our ordinary, conventional way of conceptualizing the world, and that our everyday behavior reflects our metaphorical understanding of experience. Though other theorists had noticed some of these characteristics of metaphor, Reddy was the first to demonstrate them by rigorous linguistic analysis, stating generalizations over voluminous examples."

== Background ==
Reddy's paper drew inspiration from work done by others in several different disciplines, as well as in linguistics. Research on information theory had led Norbert Wiener to publish in 1950 the seminal book on cybernetics, in which he had stated, "Society can only be understood through a study of the messages and communications facilities which belong to it." Social-systems theorist Donald Schön examined the effects of metaphorical speech in matters of public-policy; he suggested that people's conflicting frames of reference were often to blame for communication breakdown. Schön's frame-restructuring solution resembled in some ways Thomas Kuhn's groundbreaking views on the shifting of scientific paradigms through what he called the "translation" process.

Research within linguistics (including the controversial Sapir-Whorf hypothesis and Max Black's arguments against it), coupled with Uriel Weinreich's assertion that "Language is its own metalanguage", prompted Reddy to approach the conduit metaphor's exposition and its possible impact on language and thought with caution.

== Summary of Reddy's paper ==
- The way English speakers discuss communication depends on the semantics of the language itself
- English has a default conceptual framework for communicating (the conduit metaphor)
- The conduit metaphor has a self-reinforcing bias
- A contrasting, more accurate, seldom-used non-metaphorical framework exists (the toolmakers paradigm)
- The resulting frame conflict may negatively impact solutions to social and cultural problems

=== Research into core expressions ===
Reddy collected and studied examples of how English speakers talk about success or failure in communication. The overwhelming majority of what he calls core expressions involved dead metaphors selected from speakers' internal thoughts and feelings. Speakers then "put these thoughts into words" and listeners "take them out of the words." Since words are actually marks or sounds and do not literally have "insides," people talk about language largely in terms of metaphors.

Most English core expressions used in talking about communication assert that actual thoughts and feelings pass back and forth between people through the conduit of words. These core expressions and the few that do not qualify as conduit metaphors are listed in the paper's extensive appendix, which itself has been cited by Andrew Ortony as "a major piece of work, providing linguistics with an unusual corpus, as well as substantiating Reddy's claims about the pervasiveness of the root metaphor."

=== Major framework ===
There are two distinct but similar frameworks in which the conduit metaphor appears. Four types of core expressions constitute the major framework. (In the following example sentences, the operative core expressions are italicized.)

==== Language is a conduit ====
These commonplace examples—

1. You can't get your concept across to the class that way
2. His feelings came through to her only vaguely
3. They never give us any idea of what they expect

—are understood metaphorically. In 1., people do not actually "get across" concepts by talking; in 2., feelings do not really "come through to" people; and in 3., people do not in fact "give" to others their ideas, which are mental states. Listeners assemble from their own mental states a partial replica of the speakers'. These core expressions assert figuratively that language literally transfers people's mental contents to others.

==== Speakers insert thoughts into words ====
These examples—

1. Practice capturing your feelings in complete sentences
2. I need to put each idea into phrases with care
3. Insert that thought further down in the paragraph
4. She forced her meanings into the wrong lyrics
5. Please pack more sensation into fewer stanzas
6. He loads an argument with more viewpoints than it can withstand

—show that in 1., the speaker might be inexperienced in ensnaring meaning; in 2., be clumsy when putting it in; in 3., put it in the wrong place; in 4., compel words to accommodate meanings for which there is not enough room; in 5., fail to put in enough; or in 6., put in too much. These core expressions assert that speakers "insert" mental content into the "containers" represented by words with varying degrees of success.

==== Words contain thoughts ====
These examples indicate that sounds and marks can be "containers" for mental content:

1. The sense of loneliness is in just about every sentence
2. His story was pregnant with meaning
3. The entire paragraph was full of emotion
4. These lines indeed rhyme, but they are devoid of feeling
5. Your words are hollow—you don't mean them.

These core expressions assert that words contain or do not contain mental content, depending on the success or failure of the insertion process.

==== Listeners extract thoughts from words ====
These examples—

1. I couldn't actually extract coherent ideas from that prose.
2. You found some challenging concepts in the essay
3. They wouldn't really get any hatred out of those statements
4. Her remark is truly impenetrable
5. The author's intentions are going to be locked up in that dense chapter forever
6. Hiding the meaning in his sentences is just his style.
7. They're reading things into the poem

—indicate that speakers and writers are responsible to a large extent for the mental content conveyed by language, and that listeners and readers play a more passive role. However, in 7., a reader can add something to the container that was not originally there. Overall, these core expressions assert that listeners must "extract" mental content from words.

=== Minor framework ===
Instead of words, an "idea space" between people's heads can be the container for mental content. The conduit is no longer a sealed pipeline between people, but an open pipe allowing mental content to escape into, or enter from, this space. Three types of core expressions constitute the minor framework of the conduit metaphor.

==== Speakers eject thoughts into idea space ====
These examples—

1. She poured out the sorrow she'd been holding back
2. He finally got those ideas out there

—show that speakers and writers can eject mental content into an external idea space outside people.

==== Idea space contains thoughts ====
These examples—

1. That theory has been floating around for a century
2. His crazy notions made their way immediately into cyberspace
3. Those opinions are on the streets of Brooklyn, not in a classroom

—indicate that mental content has a material existence in an idea space, existing outside people.

==== Listeners extract thoughts from idea space ====
The following examples—

1. I had to absorb Einstein's ideas gradually
2. His deepest emotions went right over her head
3. We couldn't get all that stuff into our brains in one afternoon

—demonstrate that mental content from an idea space may or may not re-enter people.

=== Logical apparatus ===
The italicized words in the above examples are interchangeable with a wide array of terms that label mental content, the containers in which the content may be placed, and the ways in which these containers may be transferred in the conduit-metaphor paradigm.

Reddy developed a logical apparatus for diagramming the conduit metaphor's many permutations in both frameworks. Mental contents (feelings, emotions, ideas, etc.) are represented by RM, which stands for "repertoire member." Containers (words, phrases, sentences, etc.) are represented by S, which stands for "signal." Thus, "I need to put each idea into phrases with care" can be rendered as the core expression put RM into S. Reddy uses this logical apparatus throughout the appendix to his paper to clarify distinctions between metalingual expressions that use the conduit metaphor and the minority that do not.

=== The toolmakers paradigm ===
In order to examine the effects of the objectification of mental content in communication using the conduit metaphor, Reddy proposes an alternate, contrasting, "radical subjectivist" conception of communication called the toolmakers paradigm.

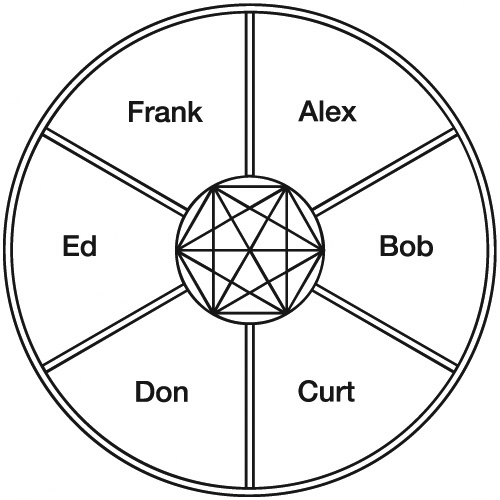

A person's mental content is in fact isolated from others'. This isolation can be represented by a wheel-shaped compound, each wedge-shaped sector of which is an environment (a brain) bounded by two spokes and part of the circumference (right). They all contain differing amounts and types of plants, rocks, water, etc. (repertoire members). The wheel's hub has machinery that can deliver sheets of paper between sectors (communication). People use it to exchange crude blueprints (signals) for making tools, shelters, foods, etc., but they have no other contact whatsoever, and know of others' existence by inferences based on these blueprints.

Living in a forested sector, Alex builds a wooden rake, draws three identical blueprints, and drops them in the slots for Bob, Curt and Don. Bob finds a piece of wood for the handle, but because he lives in a rocky sector, starts making a stone rake head. (Alex had not considered wood to be unavailable or wrong for the rake head, so it was not specified.)

When halfway done, Bob connects his stone head to the handle, realizes it will be heavy, and decides it must be a device for digging up rocks when clearing a field for planting. (He infers that Alex must be either very strong or has only small rocks in his sector.) Bob decides two large prongs will make his tool lighter, thus finishing with a two-bladed pickax. He makes three identical blueprints for his pickax and drops them in the slots for Alex, Curt and Don.

Alex assembles a kind of rock-pick, but must modify the design if a wooden, two-pronged head is to be strong enough. (He cannot see much use for the tool in his largely rock-free sector, sensing that Bob has misunderstood his rake.) Alex draws a second blueprint for the rake head and sends it out as before. Curt crafts a hoe for slicing cleanly through roots to clear out a swamp. Don creates a gaff for fishing.

Blueprint users (language users) in the toolmakers paradigm can converge by inference on accurate replications of others' tools (mental content) after a laborious series of exchanges. Using the same diagram for the conduit-metaphor paradigm instead, the hub is a duplicator that can transfer actual materials and constructions among sectors, ending the isolation. No guesswork or construction is needed: Alex puts the rake in a special chamber, pushes a button, and precise replicas appear instantly in similar chambers for Bob, Curt and Don.

The subjectivist toolmakers paradigm embodies a language requiring real effort to overcome failures in communication, whereas the objectivist conduit-metaphor paradigm embodies one in which very little effort is needed for success.

=== Core expressions are pervasive and unavoidable ===
Although the toolmakers paradigm is available as a more accurate model of communication, the conduit metaphor is pervasive and difficult to avoid in English syntax and semantics. Thinking in terms of another model of communication is generally brief, isolated and fragmentary because of an entrenched system of opposing attitudes and assumptions.

==== Pervasive ====
Reddy's tally of core expressions is about 140. Examining alternative ways of speaking about communication—either metaphorically opposed or neutral to the conduit-metaphor framework—results in a list of 30 to 40 expressions. Thus, 70% of the metalingual apparatus of the English language is based on the conduit metaphor. The influence of the remaining 30% is weakened by several factors.

- They are usually multisyllabic, Latinate abstractions (e.g. "communicate," "disseminate," "notify," "disclose," etc.), which are neither graphic nor metaphorically coherent
- Most can be used with adjuncts such as "in words," thereby losing their neutrality and lending added support to the conduit metaphor. ("Communicate your feelings using simpler words," for example, avoids the conduit metaphor, whereas, "Communicate your feelings in simpler words," does not.)
- Many of these expressions have etymological roots arising directly from the conduit-metaphor framework ("express," "disclose," etc.)

==== Unavoidable ====
Speaking carefully and attentively, it is possible to avoid conduit-metaphor expressions. For example, "Did you get anything out of that article?" might be replaced by, "Were you able to construct anything of interest on the basis of the assigned text?" Eschewing obvious conduit-metaphor expressions when communication is the topic is difficult. "Try to communicate more effectively" differs in impact from "You've got to learn how to put your thoughts into words." Reddy proceeds to show that even if avoidance were possible, it does not necessarily free people from the framework.

=== Semantic pathology via metonymy ===
A semantic pathology arises "whenever two or more incompatible senses capable of figuring meaningfully in the same context develop around the same name." "I'm sorry" is an example of two contextually relevant meanings in collision. A person may expect an apology when the other wishes only to sympathize, or anticipate sympathy but hear an apology instead.

==== Pathology in linguistic theory ====
Many other terms are ambiguous between mental content and the words "containing" it. For instance the word "poem" denotes a particular grouping of the sounds or marks (signals) exchanged between people. However, its use in sentences reveals that it can refer to thoughts or feelings (repertoire members). In this example—

The poem has four lines and forty words

—"poem" refers to a text. The word-sense can be labeled POEM_{1}. However, in this example—

Eliot's poem is so utterly depressing

—"poem" refers to the mental content assembled in its reading. The word-sense in this case can be labeled POEM_{2}. Moreover, this example—

Her poem is so sloppy!

—can be understood as either POEM_{1} or POEM_{2} (polysemy).

The ambiguity of "poem" is intimately related to the conduit metaphor. If words contain ideas, then POEM_{1} contains POEM_{2}. When two entities are commonly found together, one of their names—usually the more concrete—will develop a new sense referring to the other (the process of metonymy). Just as ROSE_{1} (the blossom) developed ROSE_{2} (a shade of pinkish red) by metonymy, so POEM_{1} gave rise to POEM_{2}.

In the toolmakers paradigm, words do not contain ideas, so POEM_{1} cannot contain POEM_{2}; therefore, a distinction between them must be preserved. Although there is only one POEM_{1} in most cases, the differences in mental content among people (and the difficult task of assembling it based on instructions in the text) mean that there are as many POEM_{2}s as there are people. These internal POEM_{2}s will only come to resemble one another after people expend effort comparing their mental content.

If language had been operating historically under the toolmakers paradigm, these two different concepts would not currently be accessed by the same word: talking about mental content and signals as if they were the same would have led to insoluble confusion. The ambiguity of "poem" would thus have been an incurable semantic pathology. However, the conduit metaphor can completely ignore it.

"Poem" is a paradigm case for the entire class of English words denoting signals ("word," "phrase," "sentence," "essay," "novel," "speech," "text," etc.), demonstrating that semantic structures can be completely normal in one view of reality and pathological in another. This lends support to the theory that language and views about reality develop together.

==== Pathology in mathematical information theory ====
Evidence of the biasing power of the conduit metaphor can be found in fields outside of linguistics. Information theory, with its concept-free algorithms and computers as models, would seem to be immune from effects arising from semantic pathology, because the framework shares many attributes with the toolmakers paradigm. Nevertheless, there is evidence that use of the conduit metaphor has hampered investigators' attempts to develop the theory.

Communication is the transfer of information (a selection from a set of alternatives). This set and a language (code) relating the alternatives to physical signals are established. A copy of each (an "a priori shared context") is placed with the sender and receiver. A sequence of the alternatives (the message) is selected for communication to the receiver, but the message itself is not sent. The selected alternatives are related by the code to energy patterns (the signal) that travel quickly and unmodified. Mathematics is used to measure quantitatively how much the received signal narrows down the possible selections from stored alternatives.

The similarity between the frameworks of information theory and the toolmakers paradigm is that

- the shared context corresponds to the repertoire members
- the signal does not contain the message
- the signal carries neither the alternatives nor a replica of the message
- the signal in the former is the blueprint in the latter
- the receiver uses the signal to duplicate the sender's selection process and recreate the message
- if a signal is received and the shared context is damaged or missing, the proper selection cannot be made

This analogy has withstood information theory's utility in simple, technical applications, but in biology, the social sciences, human language and behavior, it has been historically less successful. These attempts foundered by misunderstanding the conceptual framework of the theory rather than its mathematics. Reliance on ordinary language has made the information theory's insights less clear.

The negative impact of ordinary language on information theory's use in other fields can be traced to terms the founders themselves used to label parts of their paradigm, telegraphy. The set of alternatives (repertoire members) were called the "alphabet." While true for telegraphy, Claude Shannon and Warren Weaver used it as a nomenclature referring to any set of alternative states, behaviors, etc. The alphabet confuses the distinction between signals and repertoire members in human communication. Despite Weaver's particular interest in applying the theory to language, this fact went unrecognized.

Shannon and Weaver were also unaware that the choice of the term "message" to represent the selection of alternatives from the repertoire shared the same semantic pathology as "poem."

1. I got your message (MESSAGE_{1}), but had no time to read it
2. Okay, John, I get the message (MESSAGE_{2}); let’s leave him alone

Because MESSAGE_{1} is the signal and MESSAGE_{2} is the repertoire members in communication, the reasoning is faulty. The ambiguity is trivial in the conduit-metaphor framework, but fatal for information theory, which is based on the idea that MESSAGE_{2} cannot be transmitted. Although Shannon and Weaver noted the distinction between "received" and "transmitted" signals based on possible distortion and noise, they wrote the word "message" on the receiving end of their paradigm.

Weaver employed many conduit-metaphor expressions; for example, "How precisely do the transmitted symbols convey the desired meaning?" [italics Reddy's]. He also contrasted two "messages, one of which is heavily loaded with meaning and the other of which is pure nonsense." Weaver wrote as if repertoire members are sent, adding that the sender "changes the message into the signal" [italics Weaver's]. A code specifies how two systems relate, without changing anything; it preserves in the receiver the organizational pattern of the sender. Marks and sounds do not change into electrons, just as thoughts do not change into words.

Shannon correctly wrote, "The receiver ordinarily performs the inverse operation of that done by the transmitter, reconstructing the message from the signal." But conduit metaphors continue to appear in the form of "encode" and "decode," defined as putting the repertoire members into code and taking them out, respectively. In addition, because the theory conceives of information as the ability to copy an organization via nonrandom selections, the term "information content" is itself a misnomer: signals do something but cannot contain anything. The conduit metaphor has thus influenced the thinking of information theorists in a counterproductive way.

Confusion between the message and the signal persisted for two decades as theorists in other fields of inquiry drew on the insights of information theory. Kenneth K. Sereno and C. David Mortensen wrote that "investigators have yet to establish a completely acceptable definition of communication".

"Those models based upon a mathematical conception describe communication as analogous to the operations of an information processing machine: an event occurs in which a source or sender transmits a signal or message through a channel to some destination or receiver." [italics Sereno & Mortensen's]

Additionally, when they state, "The theory was concerned with the problem of defining the quantity of information contained in a message to be transmitted...," information is contained in a transmitted "message". If it refers to MESSAGE_{1}, it is the conduit metaphor asserting that information is contained in the signals. If it is MESSAGE_{2}, it is the repertoire members that are sent in signals, which contain measurable information. The insights of information theory have been challenged by using the conduit metaphor instead of the more accurate toolmakers paradigm, upon which its premises were initially based.

=== Opposition of conflicting paradigms ===
The conduit-metaphor paradigm states that communication failure needs explanation, because success should be automatic: materials are naturally gathered, but misguided people expend energy scattering them. Conversely, the toolmakers paradigm states that partial miscommunication is inherent and can only be fixed by continuous effort and extensive verbal interaction: materials are gathered using energy or they will be naturally scattered.

Reddy explores some of the potential social and psychological effects of believing that communication is a "success without effort" system, whereas it is an "energy must be expended" system. The conduit metaphor objectifies meaning and influences people to talk and think about mental content as if it possessed an external, inter-subjective reality.

=== Cultural and social implications ===
Having discussed the conduit metaphor's impact on theorists within and outside of linguistics, Reddy speculates about its distorting potential in culture and society. He points out that

You'll find better ideas than that in the library

is a conduit metaphor asserting that ideas are in words, which are on pages, which are in books, which are in libraries—with the result that "ideas are in libraries." The implication of this minor-framework core expression is that libraries full of books, tapes, photographs, videos and electronic media contain culture.

In the toolmakers-paradigm perspective, there are no ideas in the words; therefore, none in libraries. Instead, there are patterns of marks, bumps or magnetized particles capable of creating patterns of noise and light. Using these patterns as instructions, people can reconstruct mental content resembling that of those long gone. Since people in the past experienced a different world and used slightly different language instructions, a person unschooled in the language and lacking a full reservoir of mental content from which to draw, is unlikely to reconstruct a cultural heritage.

Because culture does not exist in books or libraries, it must be continually reconstructed in people's brains. Libraries preserve the opportunity to perform this reconstruction, but if language skills and the habit of reconstruction are not preserved, there will be no culture. Thus, Reddy asserts that the only way to preserve culture is to train people to "regrow" it in others.

He stresses that the difference of viewpoint between the conduit metaphor and the toolmakers paradigm is profound. Humanists—those traditionally charged with reconstructing culture and teaching others to reconstruct it—are increasingly rare. Reddy proposes that, despite a sophisticated system for mass communication, there is actually less communication; and moreover, that people are following a flawed manual. The conduit-metaphor influenced view is that the more signals created and preserved, the more ideas "transferred" and "stored." Society is thus often neglecting the human ability to reconstruct thought patterns based on signals. This ability atrophies when "extraction" is seen as a trivial process not requiring instruction past a rudimentary level.

Reddy concludes that the conduit metaphor may continue to have negative technological and social consequences: mass communications systems that largely ignore the internal, human systems responsible for the majority of the work in communicating. Because the logical framework of the conduit metaphor indicates people think in terms of "capturing ideas in words"—despite there being no ideas "within" the ever-increasing stream of words—a burgeoning public may be less culturally informed than expected.

== Post-publication research by others ==
Since the publication of Reddy's paper in 1979, it has garnered a large number of citations in linguistics, as well as a wide spectrum of other fields of inquiry. In 2007, a search at Web of Science revealed 354 citations broken down roughly as follows: 137 in linguistics; 45 in information science; 43 in psychology; 38 in education; 17 in sociology; 15 in anthropology; 10 in law; 9 in business/economics; 8 in neurology; 7 in medicine; 5 in political science; 4 each in the arts, biology, environmental science, and mathematics; and 1 each in architecture, geography, parapsychology and robotics.

== Further online reading ==
- Managerial and organizational communication in terms of the conduit metaphor Stephen R. Axley examines "the theoretical and empirical bases of Reddy's provocative thesis"
- The contemporary theory of metaphor George Lakoff, University of California, San Diego
- Metaphors we live by (excerpt) George Lakoff and Mark Johnson examine metaphor and provide a synopsis of the conduit metaphor
- Programming with agents Michael Travers compares the conduit metaphor and toolmakers paradigms
- Metonymic motivation of the conduit metaphor Celia Martín de León examines the role of metonymy in the conduit metaphor
- The "conduit metaphor" revisited: A reassessment of metaphors for communication Joe Grady of the University of California, Berkeley, criticizes existing analyses of the conduit metaphor
- Exculpation of the conduit metaphor Tomasz P. Krzeszowski examines the conduit metaphor in Language History and Linguistic Modelling : A Festschrift for Jacek Fisiak on His 60th Birthday (Trends in Linguistics. Studies and Monographs, 101) (Vol.1)
- The poetics of mind: figurative thought, language, and understanding Raymond W. Gibbs examines the influence of the conduit metaphor in the context of poetics
- Constructions: a construction grammar approach to argument structure Adele E. Goldberg discusses the conduit metaphor in the context of ditransitive argument structure
