= Metaphors We Live By =

1980 book by George Lakoff and Mark Johnson

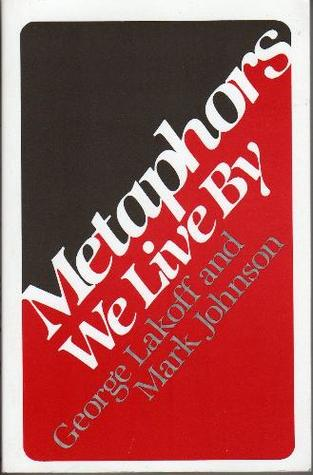
- Author: George Lakoff and Mark Johnson
- Subject: Conceptual metaphor
- Published: 1980
- Publisher: University of Chicago Press
- Pages: 242
- ISBN: 978-0226468013

Metaphors We Live By is a book by George Lakoff and Mark Johnson published in 1980. The book suggests metaphor is a tool that enables people to use what they know about their direct physical and social experiences to understand more abstract things like work, time, mental activity and feelings.

== Concepts ==
The book offered the first extensive exploration of conceptual metaphor and a detailed examination of its underlying processes. Since its publication, the field of metaphor studies within the larger discipline of cognitive linguistics has increasingly developed, with several annual academic conferences, scholarly societies, and research labs contributing to the subject-area. Some researchers, such as Gerard Steen, have worked to develop empirical investigative tools for metaphor research, including the metaphor identification procedure, or MIP. In the field of psychology, Raymond W. Gibbs, Jr., has investigated conceptual metaphor and embodiment through a number of psychological experiments. Other cognitive scientists, for example Gilles Fauconnier, study subjects similar to conceptual metaphor under the labels "analogy", "conceptual blending" and "ideasthesia".

Conceptual metaphors occur in language in everyday speech. Conceptual metaphors shape not just our communication - they may also shape the way we think and act. In George Lakoff and Mark Johnson's work, Metaphors We Live By (1980), we see how everyday language is filled with metaphors we may not always notice. An example of one of the commonly used conceptual metaphors is "argument is war".

== Applications ==
Since its publication, people have used the ideas Lakoff and Johnson proposed to comment on a wide range of topics, from the COVID-19 pandemic in the United States to conspiracy theories.

== Related ==
- Conceptual metaphor – In cognitive linguistics, relating conceptual domains
- Experientialism – Philosophical viewpoint
- Metonymy – Figure of speech
- Linguistic relativity – Hypothesis of language influencing thought
- Synecdoche – Figure of speech
- Subjectivism – Philosophy that accords primacy only to human thought
