= Experientialism =

Philosophical viewpoint

Experientialism is a philosophical view which states that there is no "purely rational" detached God's-eye view of the world which is external to human thought. It was first developed by George Lakoff and Mark Johnson in Metaphors We Live By. Experientialism is especially a response to the objectivist tradition of transcendental truth most prominently formulated by Immanuel Kant which still requires a commitment to what Lakoff and Johnson call "basic realism". Most importantly, this involves acknowledging the existence of a mind-independent external world and the possibility of stable knowledge of that external world. In Women, Fire and Dangerous Things, Lakoff expands on the foundations of experientialism with research into the nature of categories.
