= Metaphor =

Figure of speech of implicit comparison

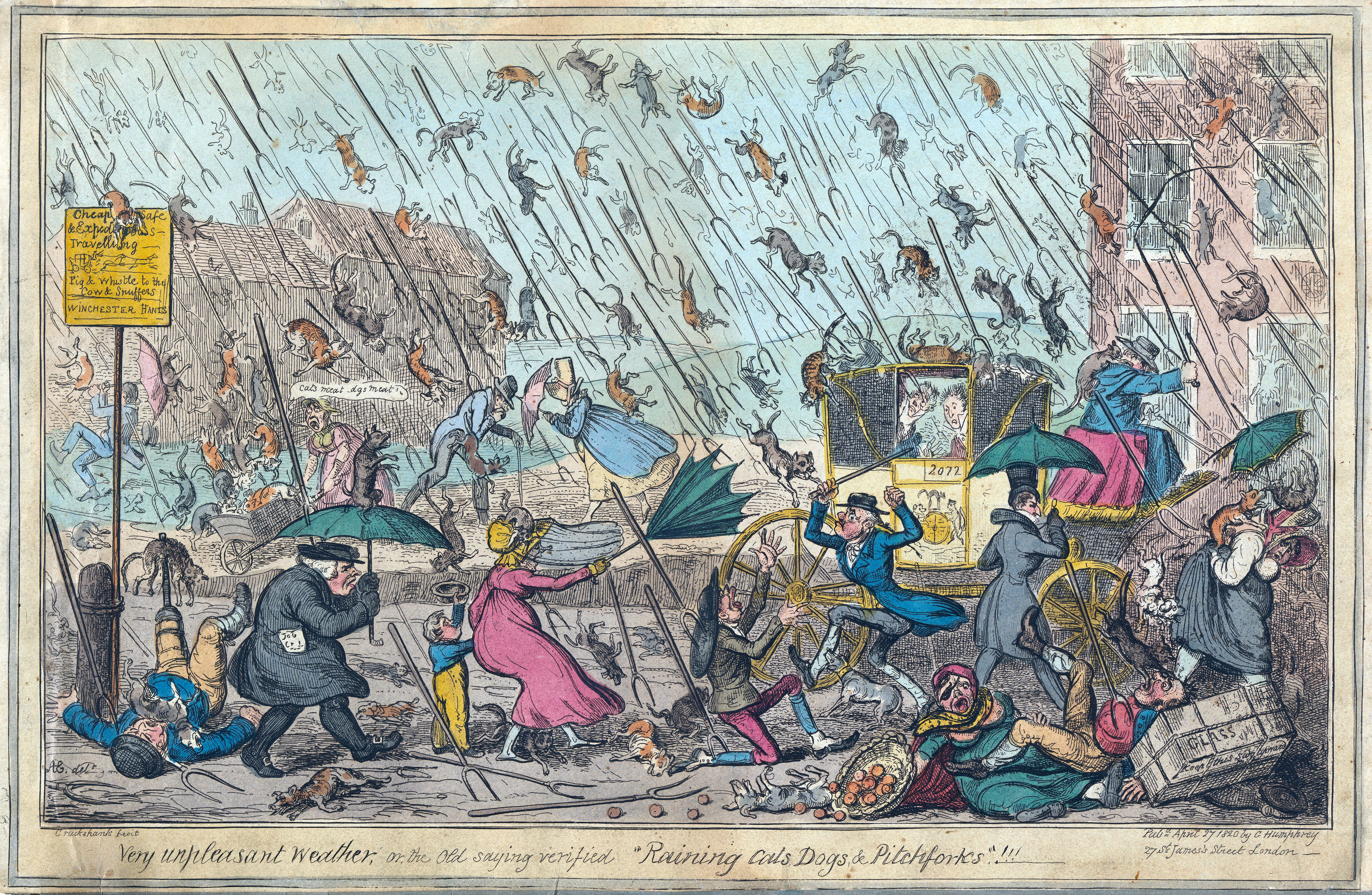
1835 etching by George Cruikshank illustrating the metaphor of describing strong weather as "raining cats, dogs and pitchforks"

A metaphor is a figure of speech that, for literary effect, refers to one thing by mentioning another. Thus, it invites the audience to make a comparison between two normally unrelated entities or ideas, which may provide clarity or identify hidden similarities between them. Metaphors are usually meant to create a likeness or an analogy.

Scholars group metaphors with other types of figurative language, such as hyperbole and metonymy. Metaphors are most similar to similes, except in metaphor the comparison is implied or assumed whereas the extra wording of a simile makes the comparison more obvious or explicit. According to Grammarly, "Figurative language examples include similes, metaphors, personification, hyperbole, allusions, and idioms." One of the most commonly cited examples of a metaphor in English literature comes from the "All the world's a stage" monologue from As You Like It:

All the world's a stage,
And all the men and women merely players;
They have their exits and their entrances
And one man in his time plays many parts,
His Acts being seven ages. At first, the infant...
—William Shakespeare, As You Like It, 2/7

This quotation expresses a metaphor because the world is not literally a stage, and most humans are not literally actors and actresses playing roles. By asserting that the world is a stage, Shakespeare uses points of comparison between the world and a stage to convey an understanding about the mechanics of the world and the behavior of the people within it.

Figurative wording, such as metaphor, does not necessarily imply a non-literal interpretation. A metaphor is a feature of language, whereas literal interpretation concerns the meaning conveyed by a text. In classical biblical hermeneutics, the "literal sense" generally refers to the meaning communicated through the words as they are used in their literary and historical context. This may include metaphor, hyperbole, irony, symbolism, idiom, and poetic language. For example, when Jesus says, "I am the door" in John 10:9, the expression is metaphorical, while the literal sense of the passage may be understood as referring to Jesus as the means of access to salvation. Interpreting the statement as describing Jesus as a physical door would therefore not constitute a more literal interpretation, but could instead be regarded as a misreading of the metaphor.

In the ancient Hebrew Book of Psalms (around 1000 B.C.), one finds vivid and poetic examples of metaphor such as, "The Lord is my rock, my fortress and my deliverer; my God is my rock, in whom I take refuge, my shield and the horn of my salvation, my stronghold" and "The Lord is my shepherd, I shall not want". Some recent linguistic theories view all language in essence as metaphorical. The etymology of a word may uncover a metaphorical usage which has since become obscured with persistent use - such as for example the English word "window", etymologically equivalent to "wind eye".

The word metaphor itself is a metaphor, coming from a Greek term meaning 'transference (of ownership)'. The user of a metaphor alters the reference of the word, "carrying" it from one semantic "realm" to another. The new meaning of the word might derive from an analogy between the two semantic realms, but also from other reasons such as the distortion of the semantic realm - for example in sarcasm.

== Etymology ==
The English word metaphor derives from the 16th-century Old French word métaphore, which comes from the Latin metaphora, 'carrying over', and in turn from the Greek μεταφορά (metaphorá), 'transference (of ownership)', from μεταφέρω (metapherō), 'to carry over, to transfer' and that from μετά (meta), 'behind, along with, across' + φέρω (pherō), 'to bear, to carry'.

== Parts of a metaphor ==
The Philosophy of Rhetoric (1936) by rhetorician I. A. Richards describes a metaphor as having two parts: the tenor and the vehicle. The tenor is the subject to which attributes are ascribed. The vehicle is the object whose attributes are borrowed. In the previous example, "the world" is compared to a stage, describing it with the attributes of "the stage"; "the world" is the tenor, and "a stage" is the vehicle; "men and women" is the secondary tenor, and "players" is the secondary vehicle.

Other writers employ the general terms ground and figure to denote the tenor and the vehicle. Cognitive linguistics uses the terms target and source, respectively.

Psychologist Julian Jaynes coined the terms metaphrand and metaphier, plus two new concepts, paraphrand and paraphier. Metaphrand is equivalent to the metaphor-theory terms tenor, target, and ground. Metaphier is equivalent to the metaphor-theory terms vehicle, figure, and source. In a simple metaphor, an obvious attribute of the metaphier exactly characterizes the metaphrand (e.g. "the ship plowed the seas"). With an inexact metaphor, however, a metaphier might have associated attributes or nuances – its paraphiers – that enrich the metaphor because they "project back" to the metaphrand, potentially creating new ideas – the paraphrands – associated thereafter with the metaphrand or even leading to a new metaphor. For example, in the metaphor "Pat is a tornado", the metaphrand is Pat; the metaphier is tornado. As metaphier, tornado carries paraphiers such as power, storm and wind, counterclockwise motion, and danger, threat, destruction, etc. The metaphoric meaning of tornado is inexact: one might understand that 'Pat is powerfully destructive' through the paraphrand of physical and emotional destruction; another person might understand the metaphor as 'Pat can spin out of control'. In the latter case, the paraphier of 'spinning motion' has become the paraphrand 'psychological spin', suggesting an entirely new metaphor for emotional unpredictability, a possibly apt description for a human being hardly applicable to a tornado. Based on his analysis, Jaynes claims that metaphors not only enhance description, but "increase enormously our powers of perception...and our understanding of [the world], and literally create new objects".

== As a type of comparison ==
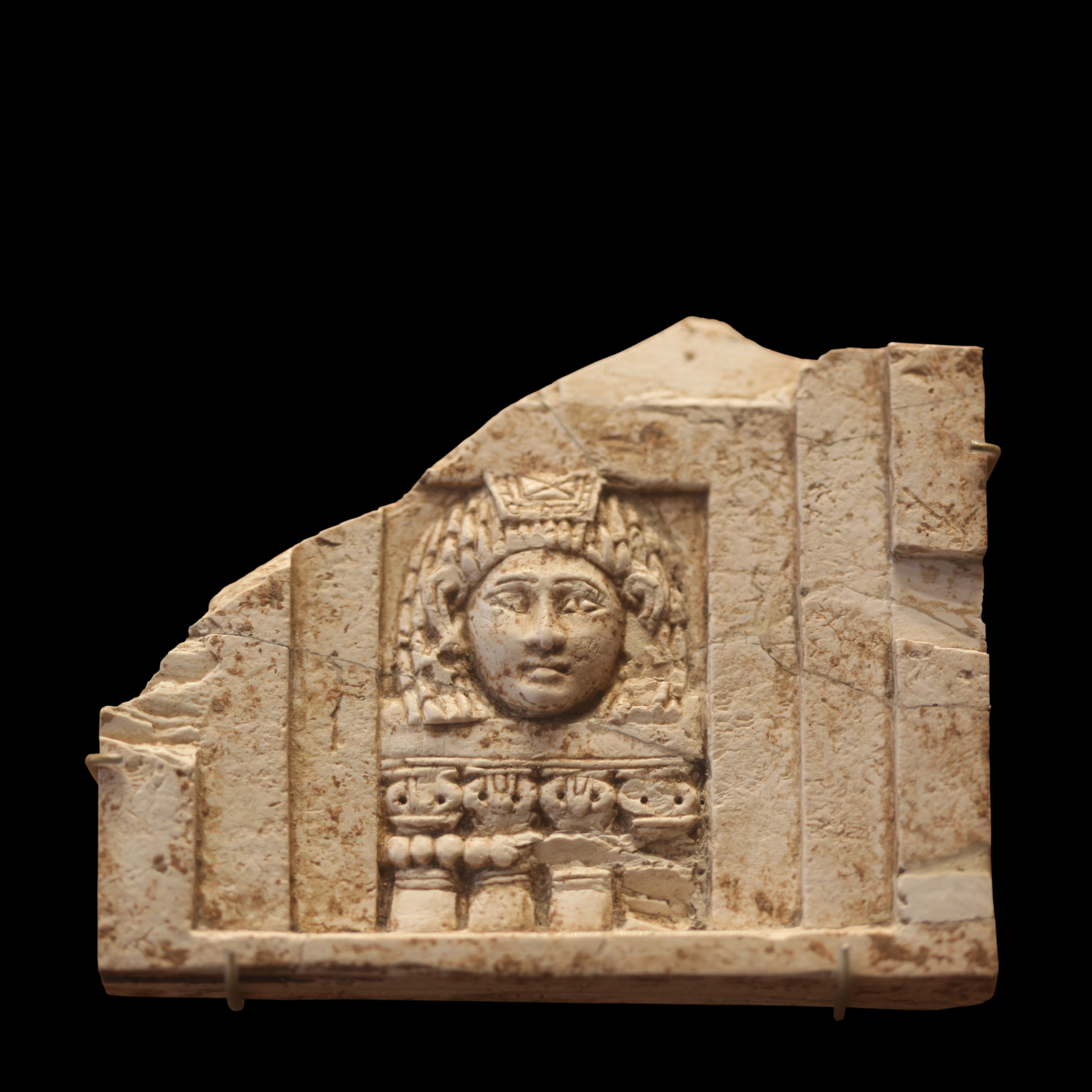
"The Asherah is part of a jigsaw in weaving together the feminine threads of a religious history that could be an important new breakthrough for women, she says." An example of mixed metaphor in print.

Metaphors are most frequently compared with similes. A metaphor asserts the objects in the comparison are identical on the point of comparison, while a simile merely asserts a similarity through use of words such as like or as. For this reason a common-type metaphor is generally considered more forceful than a simile.

=== Theories of metaphor ===
The notion that all metaphors are abbreviated similes is called the naive simile theory. However, this theory has faced widespread objections. John Searle's counterargument against the naive simile theory uses the following metaphor: "Sally is a block of ice." The theory would suggest that the metaphor's meaning (that Sally is rigid, unfriendly, unemotional, and stubborn) comes from the fact that Sally somehow has something in common with a block of ice, in that Sally is "rigid" and "cold". But the terms "rigid" and "cold" are themselves being used figuratively to mean "unemotional" and "unfriendly", something that isn't associated with other terms (such as "lukewarm"). Because of this, another "simile theory" has been proposed, called the figurative simile theory; this theory takes the comparison found in similes figuratively as opposed to a literal similarity between two concepts. Thus, according to this theory, all metaphors are abbreviated figurative similes; the figurative simile theory easily counters Searle's objection to the previous theory by stating that the metaphor's respective simile ("Sally is like a block of ice") is figurative (referring to the figurative connotations of ice). However, the figurative theory still has its flaws, one of them being that many sentences blur the line between literal or metaphorical interpretation, which may lead to some levels of semantic ambiguity.

=== Metaphor category ===
The metaphor category contains these specialized types:

- Allegory: An extended metaphor wherein a story illustrates an important attribute of the subject.
- Antithesis: A rhetorical contrast of ideas by means of parallel arrangements of words, clauses, or sentences.
- Catachresis: A mixed metaphor, sometimes used by design and sometimes by accident (a rhetorical fault).
- Hyperbole: Excessive exaggeration to illustrate a point.
- Parable: An extended metaphor told as an anecdote to illustrate or teach a moral or spiritual lesson, such as in Aesop's fables or Jesus' teaching method as told in the Bible.
- Pun: A verbal device by which multiple definitions of a word or its homophones are used to give a sentence multiple valid readings, typically to humorous effect.
- Similitude: An extended simile or metaphor that has a picture part (Bildhälfte), a reality part (Sachhälfte), and a point of comparison (tertium comparationis). Similitudes are found in the parables of Jesus.

=== Metaphor vs metonymy ===
Metaphor is distinct from metonymy, as the two concepts embody different fundamental modes of thought. Metaphor works by bringing together concepts from different conceptual domains, whereas metonymy uses one element from a given domain to refer to another closely related element. A metaphor creates new links between otherwise distinct conceptual domains, whereas a metonymy relies on pre-existent links within such domains.

For example, in the phrase "lands belonging to the crown", the word crown is a metonymy because some monarchs do indeed wear a crown, physically. In other words, there is a pre-existent link between crown and monarchy. On the other hand, when Ghil'ad Zuckermann argues that the Israeli language is a "phoenicuckoo cross with some magpie characteristics", he is using metaphor. There is no physical link between a language and a bird. The reason the metaphors phoenix and cuckoo are used is that on the one hand hybridic Israeli is based on Hebrew, which, like a phoenix, rises from the ashes; and on the other hand, hybridic Israeli is based on Yiddish, which like a cuckoo, lays its egg in the nest of another bird, tricking it to believe that it is its own egg. Furthermore, the metaphor magpie is employed because, according to Zuckermann, hybridic Israeli displays the characteristics of a magpie, "stealing" from languages such as Arabic and English.

=== Subtypes ===
A dead metaphor is a metaphor in which the sense of a transferred image has become absent. The phrases "to grasp a concept" and "to gather what you've understood" use physical action as a metaphor for understanding. The audience does not need to visualize the action; dead metaphors normally go unnoticed. Some distinguish between a dead metaphor and a cliché. Others use "dead metaphor" to denote both.

A mixed metaphor is a metaphor that leaps from one identification to a second inconsistent with the first, e.g.:

I smell a rat [...] but I'll nip him in the bud"

— Irish politician Boyle Roche

This form is often used as a parody of metaphor itself:

If we can hit that bull's-eye then the rest of the dominoes will fall like a house of cards... Checkmate.

— Futurama character Zapp Brannigan.

An extended metaphor, or conceit, sets up a principal subject with several subsidiary subjects or comparisons. In the above quote from As You Like It, the world is first described as a stage and then the subsidiary subjects men and women are further described in the same context.

An implicit metaphor has no specified tenor, although the vehicle is present. M. H. Abrams offers the following as an example of an implicit metaphor: "That reed was too frail to survive the storm of its sorrows". The reed is the vehicle for the implicit tenor, someone's death, and the storm is the vehicle for the person's sorrows.

Metaphor can serve as a device for persuading an audience of the user's argument or thesis, the so-called rhetorical metaphor.

=== Absolute metaphor ===
The term absolute metaphor describes the special case of a metaphor that has become independent of the facts it illustrates. It was coined by the German philosopher Hans Blumenberg in the context of his collaboration on the project of history of concepts (German: Begriffsgeschichte).

Blumenberg adopted from Immanuel Kant the phrase describing the relation between the physical world and the Unknown (similar to the one between an artifact and its designer), modifying it as the "transfer of reflection on an object of intuition to a completely different concept, to which perhaps no intuition can ever directly correspond." For example, "world is a theater" (theatrum mundi) is an absolute metaphor as it is supposed to compare an ‘impossible-to-define ‘concept ("world") to an apparently unrelated one ("theater").

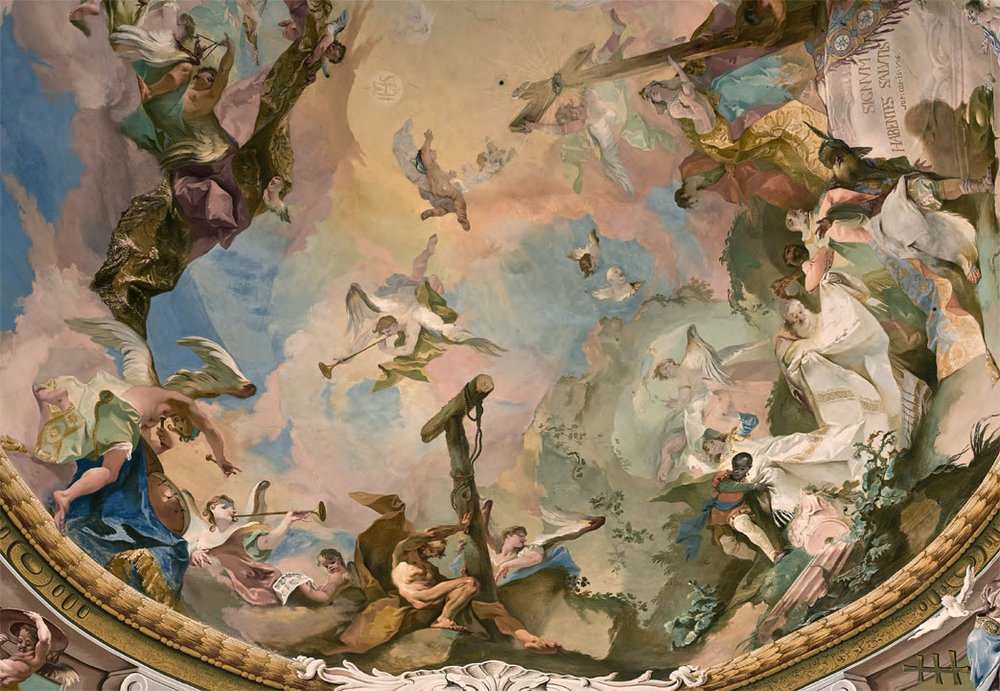
The phrase "world is a theater" is an absolute metaphor

== In rhetoric and literature ==
Aristotle writes in his work the Rhetoric that metaphors make learning pleasant: "To learn easily is naturally pleasant to all people, and words signify something, so whatever words create knowledge in us are the pleasantest." When discussing Aristotle's Rhetoric, Jan Garret stated "metaphor most brings about learning; for when [Homer] calls old age "stubble", he creates understanding and knowledge through the genus, since both old age and stubble are [species of the genus of] things that have lost their bloom". Metaphors, according to Aristotle, have "qualities of the exotic and the fascinating; but at the same time we recognize that strangers do not have the same rights as our fellow citizens".

Educational psychologist Andrew Ortony gives more explicit detail: "Metaphors are necessary as a communicative device because they allow the transfer of coherent chunks of characteristics – perceptual, cognitive, emotional and experiential – from a vehicle which is known to a topic which is less so. In so doing they circumvent the problem of specifying one by one each of the often unnameable and innumerable characteristics; they avoid discretizing the perceived continuity of experience and are thus closer to experience and consequently more vivid and memorable."

=== As style in speech and writing ===
As a characteristic of speech and writing, metaphors can serve the poetic imagination. This allows Sylvia Plath, in her poem "Cut", to compare the blood issuing from her cut thumb to the running of a million soldiers, "redcoats, every one"; and enabling Robert Frost, in "The Road Not Taken", to compare a life to a journey.

Metaphors can be implied and extended throughout pieces of literature.

== Larger applications ==
Sonja K. Foss characterizes metaphors as "nonliteral comparisons in which a word or phrase from one domain of experience is applied to another domain". She argues that since reality is mediated by the language we use to describe it, the metaphors we use shape the world and our interactions to it.

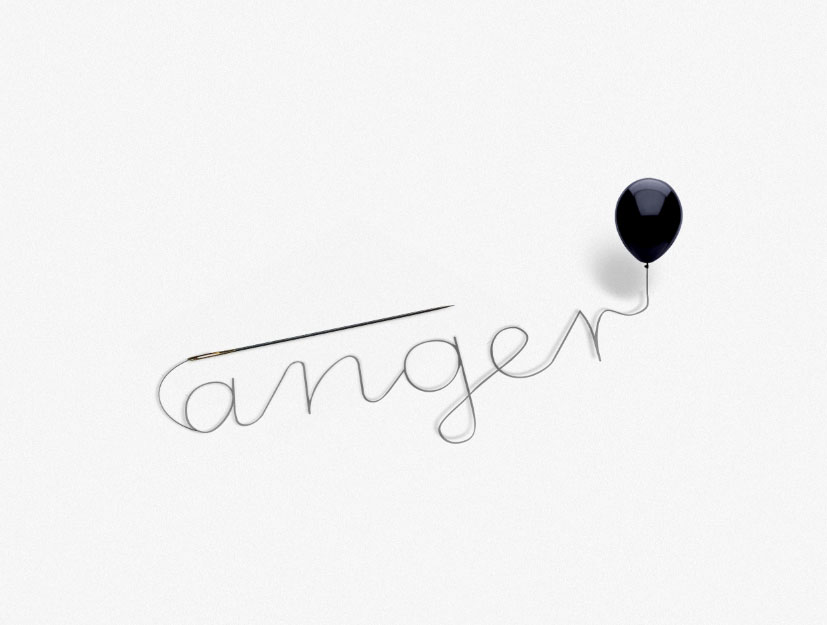
A metaphorical visualization of the word anger

The term "metaphor" can characterise basic or general aspects of experience and cognition:

- A cognitive metaphor is the association of object to an experience outside the object's environment.
- A conceptual metaphor is an underlying association that is systematic in both language and thought.
- A root metaphor is the underlying worldview that shapes an individual's understanding of a situation.
- A nonlinguistic metaphor is an association between two nonlinguistic realms of experience.
- A visual metaphor uses an image to create the link between different ideas.

=== Conceptual metaphors ===
Some theorists have suggested that metaphors are not merely stylistic, but are also cognitively important. In Metaphors We Live By (1980), George Lakoff and Mark Johnson argue that metaphors are pervasive in everyday life, not only in language but also in thought and action. A common definition of metaphor presents it as a comparison that shows how two things, which are not alike in most ways, are similar in another important way. In this context, metaphors contribute to the creation of multiple meanings within polysemic complexes across different languages. Furthermore, Lakoff and Johnson explain that a metaphor is essentially the understanding and experiencing of one kind of thing in terms of another, which they refer to as a "conduit metaphor". According to this view, a speaker can put ideas or objects into containers and then send them along a conduit to a listener, who removes the object from the container to make meaning of it. Thus, communication is conceptualized as something that ideas flow into, with the container being separate from the ideas themselves. Lakoff and Johnson provide several examples of daily metaphors in use, including "argument is war" and "time is money". These metaphors occur widely in various contexts to express personal meanings. In addition, the authors suggest that communication can be viewed as a machine: "Communication is not what one does with the machine, but is the machine itself."

Moreover, experimental evidence shows that "priming" people with material from one area can influence how they perform tasks and interpret language in a metaphorically related area. (Note: "In sum, there are now numerous results from comprehension-oriented studies suggesting that (1) comprehending metaphorical language activates concrete source domain concepts, and that (2) activating particular concrete perceptual or motor knowledge affects subsequent reasoning and language comprehension about a metaphorically connected abstract domain")

Omnipresent metaphor may provide an indicator for researching the functionality of language.

=== As a foundation of our conceptual system ===
Cognitive linguists emphasize that metaphors serve to facilitate the understanding of one conceptual domain—typically an abstraction such as "life", "theories" or "ideas"—through expressions that relate to another, more familiar conceptual domain—typically more concrete, such as "journey", "buildings" or "food". For example: one devours a book of raw facts, tries to digest them, stews over them, lets them simmer on the back-burner, regurgitates them in discussions, and cooks up explanations, hoping they do not seem half-baked.

A convenient short-hand way of capturing this view of metaphor is the following: Conceptual Domain (A) is Conceptual Domain (B), which is what is called a conceptual metaphor. A conceptual metaphor consists of two conceptual domains, in which one domain is understood in terms of another. A conceptual domain is any coherent organization of experience. For example, we have coherently organized knowledge about journeys that we rely on in understanding life.

Lakoff and Johnson greatly contributed to establishing the importance of conceptual metaphor as a framework for thinking in language, leading scholars to investigate the original ways in which writers used novel metaphors and to question the fundamental frameworks of thinking in conceptual metaphors.

From a sociological, cultural, or philosophical perspective, one asks to what extent ideologies maintain and impose conceptual patterns of thought by introducing, supporting, and adapting fundamental patterns of thinking metaphorically. The question is to what extent the ideology fashion and refashion the idea of the nation as a container with borders, and how enemies and outsiders are represented.

Some cognitive scholars have attempted to take on board the idea that different languages have evolved radically different concepts and conceptual metaphors, while others hold to the Sapir-Whorf hypothesis. German philologist Wilhelm von Humboldt (1767–1835) contributed significantly to this debate on the relationship between culture, language, and linguistic communities. Humboldt remains, however, relatively unknown in English-speaking nations. Andrew Goatly, in "Washing the Brain", takes on board the dual problem of conceptual metaphor as a framework implicit in the language as a system and the way individuals and ideologies negotiate conceptual metaphors. Neural biological research suggests that some metaphors are innate, as demonstrated by reduced metaphorical understanding in psychopathy.

James W. Underhill, in Creating Worldviews: Ideology, Metaphor & Language (Edinburgh UP), considers the way individual speech adopts and reinforces certain metaphoric paradigms. This involves a critique of both communist and fascist discourse. Underhill's studies are situated in Czech and German, which allows him to demonstrate the ways individuals are thinking both within and resisting the modes by which ideologies seek to appropriate key concepts such as "the people", "the state", "history", and "struggle".

Though metaphors can be considered to be "in" language, Underhill's chapter on French, English and ethnolinguistics demonstrates that language or languages cannot be conceived of in anything other than metaphoric terms.

Several other philosophers have embraced the view that metaphors may also be described as examples of a linguistic "category mistake" which have the potential of leading unsuspecting users into considerable obfuscation of thought within the realm of epistemology. Included among them is the Australian philosopher Colin Murray Turbayne. In his book The Myth of Metaphor, Turbayne argues that the use of metaphor is an essential component within the context of any language system which claims to embody richness and depth of understanding. In addition, he clarifies the limitations associated with a literal interpretation of the mechanistic Cartesian and Newtonian depictions of the universe as little more than a "machine" – a concept which continues to underlie much of the scientific materialism which prevails in the modern Western world. He argues further that the philosophical concept of "substance" or "substratum" has limited meaning at best and that physicalist theories of the universe depend upon mechanistic metaphors which are drawn from deductive logic in the development of their hypotheses. By interpreting such metaphors literally, Turbayne argues that modern man has unknowingly fallen victim to only one of several metaphorical models of the universe which may be more beneficial in nature.

In his book In Other Shoes: Music, Metaphor, Empathy, Existence Kendall Walton also places the formulation of metaphors at the center of a "Game of Make Believe," which is regulated by tacit norms and rules. These "principles of generation" serve to determine several aspects of the game which include: what is considered to be fictional or imaginary, as well as the fixed function which is assumed by both objects and people who interact in the game. Walton refers to such generators as "props" which can serve as means to the development of various imaginative ends. In "content oriented" games, users derive value from such props as a result of the intrinsic fictional content which they help to create through their participation in the game. As familiar examples of such content oriented games, Walton points to putting on a play of Hamlet or "playing cops and robbers". Walton further argues, however, that not all games conform to this characteristic. In the course of creating fictions through the use of metaphor we can also perceive and manipulate props into new improvised representations of something entirely different in a game of "make-believe". Suddenly the properties of the props themselves take on primary importance. In the process the participants in the game may be only partially conscious of the "prop oriented" nature of the game itself.

=== Nonlinguistic metaphors ===
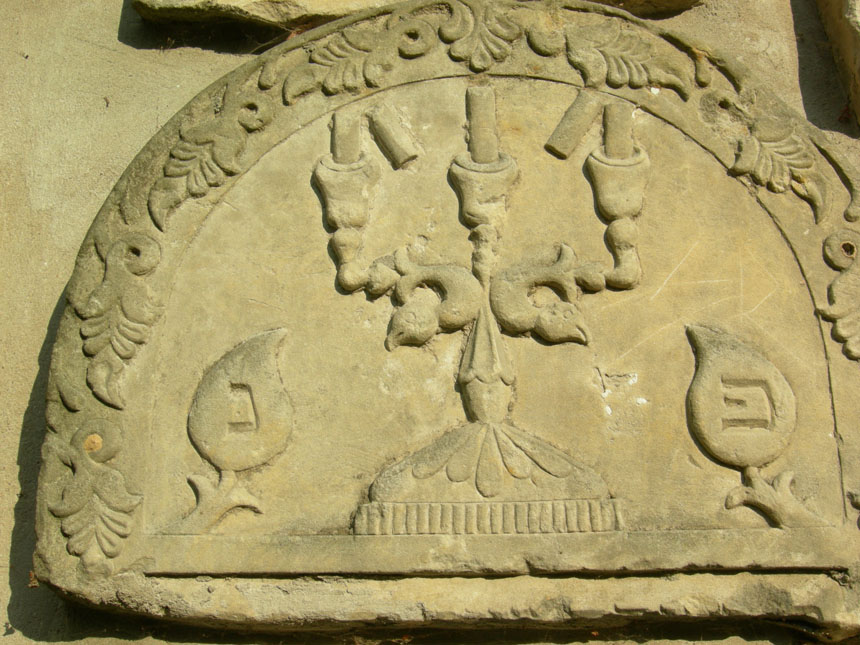
Tombstone of a Jewish woman depicting broken candles, a visual metaphor of the end of life

Metaphors can map experience between two nonlinguistic realms. Musicologist Leonard B. Meyer demonstrated how purely rhythmic and harmonic events can express human emotions.

Art theorist Robert Vischer argued that when we look at a painting, we "feel ourselves into it" by imagining our body in the posture of a nonhuman or inanimate object in the painting. For example, the painting The Lonely Tree by Caspar David Friedrich shows a tree with contorted, barren limbs. Looking at the painting, some recipients may imagine their limbs in a similarly contorted and barren shape, evoking a feeling of strain and distress.

Nonlinguistic metaphors may be the foundation of our experience of visual and musical art, as well as dance and other art forms.

== In historical linguistics ==
In historical onomasiology or in historical linguistics, a metaphor is defined as a semantic change based on a similarity in form or function between the original concept and the target concept named by a word.

For example, mouse: "small, gray rodent with a long tail" → "small, gray computer device with a long cord".

Some recent linguistic theories hold that language evolved from the capability of the brain to create metaphors that link actions and sensations to sounds.

== Historical theories ==
Aristotle discusses the creation of metaphors at the end of his Poetics: "But the greatest thing by far is to be a master of metaphor. It is the one thing that cannot be learnt from others; and it is also a sign of genius, since a good metaphor implies an intuitive perception of the similarity in dissimilars."

Baroque literary theorist Emanuele Tesauro defines the metaphor "the most witty and acute, the most strange and marvelous, the most pleasant and useful, the most eloquent and fecund part of the human intellect". There is, he suggests, something divine in metaphor: the world itself is God's poem and metaphor is not just a literary or rhetorical figure but an analytic tool that can penetrate the mysteries of God and His creation.

Friedrich Nietzsche makes metaphor the conceptual center of his early theory of society in On Truth and Lies in the Non-Moral Sense. Some sociologists have found his essay useful for thinking about metaphors used in society and for reflecting on their own use of metaphor. Sociologists of religion note the importance of metaphor in religious worldviews, and that it is impossible to think sociologically about religion without metaphor.

== Psychological effects ==
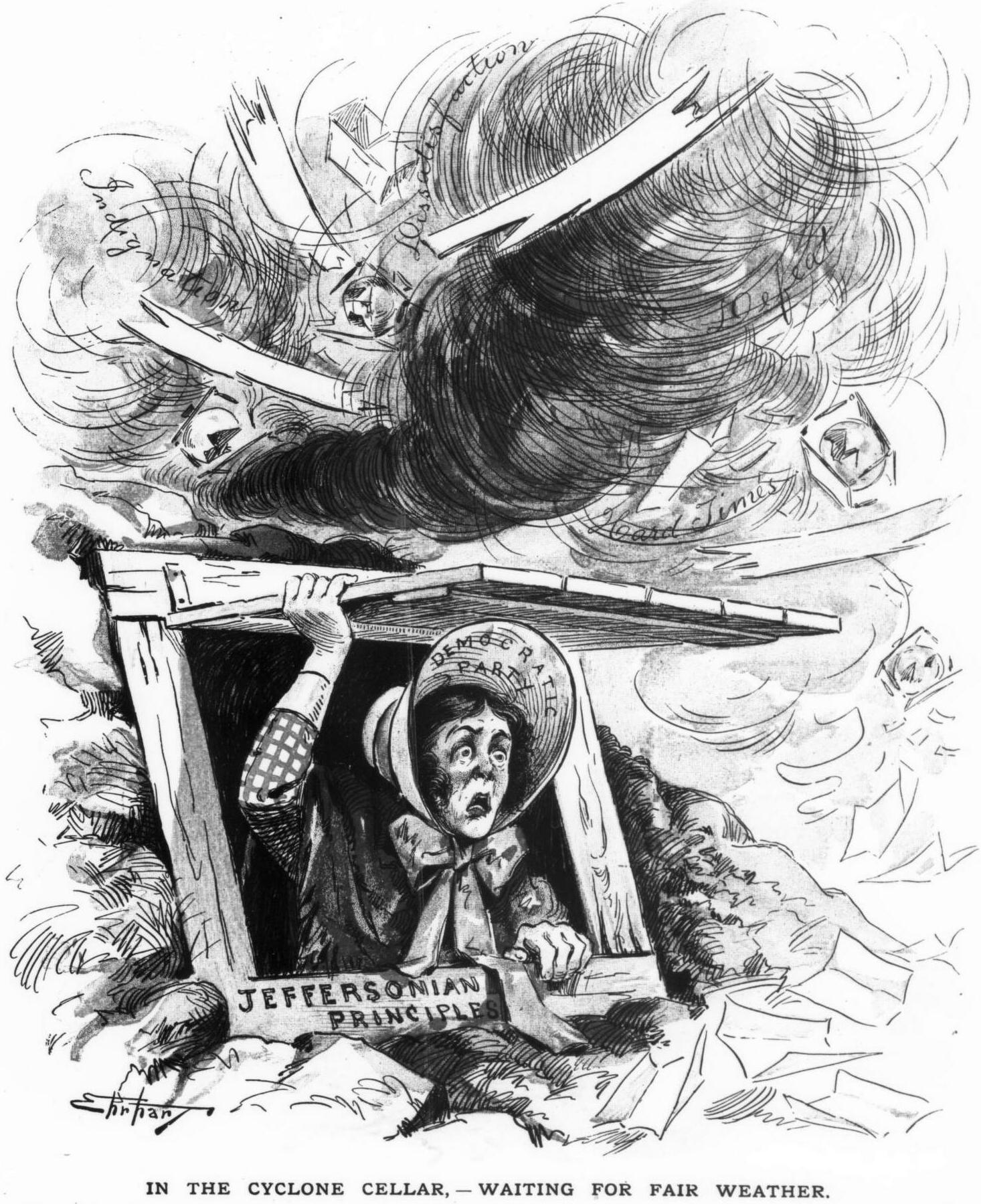
A political cartoon by illustrator S.D. Ehrhart in an 1894 Puck magazine shows a farm-woman labeled "Democratic Party" sheltering from a tornado of political change.

Psychological research has shown that metaphors influence perception, reasoning, and decision-making by shaping how people conceptualize abstract ideas. Studies in cognitive linguistics suggest that metaphors are not merely stylistic devices but fundamental to human cognition, as they structure the way people understand and interact with the world. Experiments demonstrate that different metaphorical framings can alter judgment and behavior. For example, a study by Thibodeau and Boroditsky (2011) found that describing crime as a "beast preying on the city" led participants to support more punitive law enforcement policies, whereas framing crime as a "virus infecting the city" increased support for social reform and prevention measures. Similarly, studies on political discourse suggest that metaphors shape attitudes toward policy decisions, with metaphors like "tax relief" implying that taxation is an inherent burden, thus influencing public opinion.

Metaphors also play a crucial role in how people experience crises, such as the COVID-19 pandemic. A study by Baranowski et al. (2024) analyzed the use of metaphorical imagery in professional healthcare literature and found that metaphors significantly influenced how healthcare workers perceived and emotionally responded to the pandemic. Their research identified different categories of metaphorical framings—such as war metaphors ("fighting the pandemic") and transformational metaphors ("lessons learned from the crisis")—which led to varying emotional responses among healthcare workers. While war metaphors were widely used, they could also induce feelings of helplessness if the metaphor implied an unwinnable battle. In contrast, metaphors that framed the pandemic as a challenge or learning opportunity tended to promote a sense of empowerment and resilience. These findings align with previous research showing that metaphors can significantly impact emotional processing and coping strategies in stressful situations.

Moreover, metaphorical language can impact emotions and mental health. For instance, describing depression as "drowning" or "a dark cloud" can intensify the emotional experience of distress, while framing it as "a journey with obstacles" can encourage resilience and problem-solving approaches. These findings highlight the pervasive role of metaphors in shaping thought processes, reinforcing the idea that language not only reflects but also constructs reality.

== See also ==
- Conceptual blending
- Hypocatastasis
- Ideasthesia
- List of English-language metaphors
- Literal and figurative language
- Metaphor identification procedure
- Metaphor in philosophy
- Metonymy
- Misnomer
- Origin of language
- Pataphor
- Personification
- Reification (fallacy)
- Sarcasm
- Synecdoche
- Tertium comparationis
- War as metaphor
- World Hypotheses
