= ZTE Groove =

2013 enry-level handset

- Manufacturer: ZTE
- Type: Smartphone
- First released: United States: November 5, 2012 (Cricket Wireless)
- Compatible networks: CDMA
- Dimensions: 118.6 mm (4.67 in) H 62.5 mm (2.46 in) W 13.9 mm (0.55 in) D
- Weight: 128 g (4.5 oz)
- Operating system: Android 2.3
- System-on-chip: Snapdragon S1 MSM7627A
- CPU: 800 MHz ARM Cortex-A5
- GPU: Adreno 200
- Memory: 512 MB RAM
- Storage: 1 GB
- Removable storage: microSDHC up to 32 GB
- Battery: 1,500 mAh Li-ion
- Rear camera: 3.2 MP with LED flash Video: 720p
- Front camera: 0.3 MP VGA
- Display: 3.5 in (89 mm) TFT; 480 x 320 px, 165 PPI, 262,144 colors
- Connectivity: Bluetooth 2.1, Wi-Fi 802.11 b/g/n, microUSB 2.0
- Model: X501

The ZTE Groove is an entry-level Android smartphone manufactured and branded by ZTE, released in November 2012 by Cricket Wireless.

== Specifications ==
=== Hardware ===
The Groove was installed with a Snapdragon S1 chipet, an 800MHz Cortex A5 processor, and an Andreno 200 graphics processor. It has an internal storage of 1 GB with 512 MB of RAM, as well as microSD up to 32 GB.

It has a battery capacity of 1,500 mAh, which provides 6-7 hours of talk time.

=== Display ===
The ZTE Groove is housed by a 3.5-inch TFT display with a resolution of 480 x 320 pixels.

=== Camera ===
The Groove has a 3.2-megapixel camera with maximum zoom in up t 4x and video recording up to 720 pixels. The front camera has a 0.3-megapixel VGA module.

=== Software ===
The Groove runs on Android 2.3.

== Reception ==
- Uno and Bubble Bash 2 are pre-installed games that can't uninstall.The Bubble Bash 2 is considered "horribly ugly".
