= Compound empowerment =

Compound empowerment refers to the way in which public infrastructure is used to radically increase the accumulation of private wealth. The term denotes how commonwealth—tax-supported resources, such as public education, financial and legal infrastructure, are translated into private or corporate profit. While wealth might be generated in part by intangible or personal qualities such as intelligence or a strong work ethic, this wealth is compounded by empowering structures such as access to stable markets, consistent law enforcement, and the use of resources held in common, such as public roads. The greater the wealth of an individual or corporation, the more they use commonwealth to increase and sustain their earnings.

== Private wealth and common wealth ==
The concept of compound empowerment stresses the degree to which the acquisition of great private wealth depends upon common structures. For example, while a wealthy individual such as Bill Gates might owe his status as the world's richest man largely to his intelligence and innovation, his ability to earn and maintain his fortune was and is compounded by public resources held in common. According to theorists such as George Lakoff, the prominent cognitive linguist and founder of the non-partisan think tank the Rockridge Institute, Bill Gates "built his company with many employees educated in public schools and universities. Tax-funded research helped develop computer science and the Internet. Trade laws negotiated and enforced by the government protect his ability to sell his products abroad. These are but a few of the ways in which Mr. Gates' accumulation of wealth was empowered by the commonwealth and by taxation."

The inextricability of private wealth and public resources was influentially formulated by the political philosopher John Rawls, who argued that wealth is arbitrary from a moral point of view, as those factors that enable the accumulation of wealth in society are largely contingent—that is, are the outcome of luck more than of morally relevant activity.

== Compound empowerment and fair taxation ==
Compound empowerment has been evoked to justify progressive taxation and other policies that stress the fundamental fairness of taxing wealthy individuals and corporations in a manner commensurate with their earnings. Because private capital is compounded by infrastructural resources held in common, supporters of progressive taxation argue that rich individuals and businesses should be called upon to support the infrastructures that enable the acquisition and maintenance of their wealth. Since a poor individual uses compound empowerment to a far lesser degree than wealthy individuals, it follows that the former would pay a smaller portion of taxes than the latter. Advocates of tax cuts or other policies that mitigate the taxation of the wealthy tend to argue that progressive taxation "punishes" the rich for their superior performance in the market. The concept of compound empowerment, on the other hand, argues that having generated their wealth in part through public structures, fairness demands an equitable return to those structures through graduated taxation.

== See also ==
- Progressive taxation
- Tax cut
- Economic inequality
- Rockridge Institute
