= Literal and figurative language =

Distinction in certain fields of language analysis

The distinction between literal and figurative language exists in all natural languages; the phenomenon is studied within certain areas of language analysis, linguistics, and the humanities, in particular stylistics, rhetoric, and semantics.

Literal language is the usage of words exactly according to their direct, straightforward, or conventionally accepted meanings: their denotation.

Figurative (or non-literal) language is the usage of words deviating beyond their conventionally accepted definitions in order to convey a more complex meaning or achieve a heightened effect. This is done by presenting words in such a way that their audience equates, compares, or associates the words with normally unrelated meanings. A common intended effect of figurative language is to elicit audience responses that are especially emotional (like excitement, shock, laughter, etc.), aesthetic, or intellectual.

The ancient Greek philosopher Aristotle, and later the Roman rhetorician Quintilian, were among the early documented language analysts who expounded on the differences between literal and figurative language. A comprehensive scholarly examination of metaphor in antiquity, and the way its use was fostered by Homer's epic poems The Iliad and The Odyssey, is provided by William Bedell Stanford.

Within literary analysis, the terms "literal" and "figurative" are still used; but within the fields of cognition and linguistics, the basis for identifying such a distinction is no longer used.

== The definition of literal language ==
Literal usage confers meaning to words, in the sense of the meaning words have by themselves, for example as defined in a dictionary. It maintains a consistent meaning regardless of the context, with the intended meaning of a phrase corresponding exactly to the meaning of its individual words. On the other hand, figurative use of language is the use of words or phrases with a meaning that does make literal sense but that encourages certain mental associations or reflects a certain type of truth, perhaps a more artistically presented one.

== Figurative language ==
Instances of figurative language, commonly called figures of speech (though this can have other, slightly distinct meanings as well), range from simile to metaphor to hyperbole to many other types. Merriam-Webster's Encyclopedia of Literature says that figurative language can be classified in five categories: resemblance or relationship, emphasis or understatement, figures of sound, verbal games, and errors.

A simile is a comparison of two things, indicated by some connective, usually "like", "as", "than", or a verb such as "resembles" to show how they are similar.

Example: "His cheeks were like roses, his nose like a cherry.../And the beard on his chin was as white as the snow." (emph added)—Clement Clark Moore

A metaphor is a figure of speech in which two "essentially unlike things" are shown to have a type of resemblance or create a new image. The similarities between the objects being compared may be implied rather than directly stated. The literary critic and rhetorician, I. A. Richards, divides a metaphor into two parts: the vehicle and the tenor.

Example: "Fog comes on little cat feet"—Carl Sandburg In this example, “little cat feet” is the vehicle that clarifies the tenor, “fog”. A comparison between the vehicle and tenor (also called the teritium comparitionis) is implicit: fog creeps in silently like a cat.

An extended metaphor is a metaphor that is continued over multiple sentences.

Example: "The sky steps out of her daywear/Slips into her shot-silk evening dress./An entourage of bats whirr and swing at her hem, ...She's tried on every item in her wardrobe." Dilys Rose

Onomatopoeia is a word designed to be an imitation of a sound.

Example: “Bark! Bark!” went the dog as he chased the car that vroomed past.

Personification is the attribution of a personal nature or character to inanimate objects or abstract notions, especially as a rhetorical figure.

Example: "Because I could not stop for Death,/He kindly stopped for me;/The carriage held but just ourselves/And Immortality."—Emily Dickinson. Dickinson portrays death as a carriage driver.

An oxymoron is a figure of speech in which a pair of opposite or contradictory terms is used together for emphasis.

Examples: Organized chaos, Same difference, Bittersweet.

A paradox is a statement or proposition which is self-contradictory, unreasonable, or illogical.

Example: This statement is a lie.

Hyperbole is a figure of speech which uses an extravagant or exaggerated statement to express strong feelings.

Example: They had been walking so long that John thought he might drink the entire lake when they came upon it.

Allusion is a reference to a famous character or event.

Example: A single step can take you through the looking glass if you're not careful.

An idiom is an expression that has a figurative meaning often related, but different from the literal meaning of the phrase.

Example: You should keep your eye out for him.

A pun is an expression intended for a humorous or rhetorical effect by exploiting different meanings of words.

Example: I wondered why the ball was getting bigger. Then it hit me.

=== Use of literally non-literally ===
Commentators have often noted (and sometimes criticized) how the word literally itself is very commonly now used non-literally to intensify the meaning of a sentence (as in "I literally died of laughter", where clearly the speaker did not die). Far from this being a recent development, however, this usage goes at least as far back as the 19th century. Frances Brooke's 1769 novel The History of Emily Montague was used in the earliest Oxford English Dictionary (OED) citation for the figurative sense of literally; the sentence from the novel used was: "He is a fortunate man to be introduced to such a party of fine women at his arrival; it is literally to feed among the lilies." This citation was also used in the OED's 2011 revision.

== Standard pragmatic model of comprehension ==
Prior to the 1980s, the "standard pragmatic" model of comprehension was widely believed. In that model, it was thought the recipient would first attempt to comprehend the meaning as if literal, but when an appropriate literal inference could not be made, the recipient would shift to look for a figurative interpretation that would allow comprehension. Since then, research has cast doubt on the model. In tests, figurative language was found to be comprehended at the same speed as literal language; and so the premise that the recipient was first attempting to process a literal meaning and discarding it before attempting to process a figurative meaning appears to be false.

== Reddy and contemporary views ==
Beginning with the work of Michael Reddy in his 1979 paper "The Conduit Metaphor", many linguists now deny that there is a valid way to distinguish between a "literal" and "figurative" mode of language. Nevertheless, work has continued on making such a distinction.

== See also ==
- Biblical literalism
- Connotation (semiotics)
- Denotation (semiotics)
- Denotation
- Figures of speech
- Frances Brooke
- Imagery
- Linguistics
- Literal translation
- Metaphor
- Metonymy
- Phatic expression
- Philosophy of language
- Rhetoric
- Semantics
- Semiotics
- Signified and signifier
