= Texans for Truth =

Texans for Truth (TfT) was a political advocacy organization, registered under Section 527 of the United States tax code, formed to oppose George W. Bush's re-election efforts in the 2004 presidential election. In September 2004, the group began airing advertisements in various swing states that questioned Bush's National Guard record, particularly as to whether or not he fulfilled his obligations to serve.

== Membership and organization ==
On its website, the TfT stated that it was established by "the 20,000-member Texas online activist group, DriveDemocracy.org ". DriveDemocracy.org is an organization started in April 2004 by MoveOn.org, a large advocacy group opposing Bush. Glenn W Smith of Austin, the founder and head of TfT, is a former political reporter for the Houston Chronicle and Houston Post. He has worked as a Democratic political consultant on several campaigns, including Democrat Tony Sanchez's campaign for governor of Texas in 2002. Smith said he started TfT in response to another 527 group, Swift Boat Veterans for Truth, that challenged the legitimacy of how Senator John Kerry received his Vietnam War medals as well as his accounts about the Vietnam War.

The Bush-Cheney campaign dismissed TfT as "a smear group launching baseless attacks on behalf of John Kerry's campaign that will be rejected by the American people" , and maintains that "the president served honorably in the National Guard, fulfilled his duties and was honorably discharged." Various questions about his National Guard record, including those based on information from military documents, have been raised against Bush since the 2000 presidential campaign and even before that, in 1994 and 1998 when he twice won election as the Governor of Texas. This article describes only the participation in this long-standing dispute by the Texans for Truth organization. For a comprehensive review of the allegations, responses, and evidence, see George W. Bush military service controversy.

== Media activities ==
=== First television advertisement ===
The first advertisement features testimony from Bob Mintz, a lieutenant colonel in the 187th Alabama Air National Guard unit in 1972, where Bush was assigned to serve that year. In the video, Mintz claims that he never saw Bush, and is quoted contending that "It would be impossible to be unseen in a unit of that size." The ad concludes by asking: "Was George W. Bush AWOL in Alabama?"

=== Second television advertisement ===
The second advertisement reiterates the charges against George W. Bush that he did not fulfill his military service requirements but also accuses George H. W. Bush of pulling strings in order for his son to get into the Texas Air National Guard. In addition, the advertisement quotes Bush's statement on Meet the Press (February 8, 2004) that he would authorize release of his records, and it criticizes him because he has not signed the actual form (Standard Form 180) to effect the release: "You pledged to release all of your military records, but you've not signed the papers to do so. Sign them now. Keep your word."

== FEC complaint ==
On September 25, 2004, the Houston Chronicle reported that Democracy 21, the Campaign Legal Center and OpenSecrets had filed a complaint with the Federal Election Commission against Texans for Truth, alleging violations of campaign finance laws.

These watchdog organizations also previously complained to the FEC about Swift Boat Veterans for Truth and other pro-Republican groups.

== News articles about Texans for Truth ==
- "'Texans for Truth' ad challenges Bush on Guard service" USA Today, September 7, 2004
- "Records Say Bush Balked at Order" - Washington Post, September 9, 2004
- "TV writer gives $100G to Texans for Truth" ABC News - September 9, 2004
- "Swift Boat Vets, Texans Battle for 'Truth' " Adweek.com - September 23, 2004
