= Rockridge Institute =

- Formation: 1997
- Headquarters: Berkeley, California, United States
- Senior Fellows: George Lakoff; Glenn W. Smith; Eric Haas
- Executive Director: Bruce Budner
- Website: rockridgeinstitute.org

The Rockridge Institute was an American non-profit research and progressive think tank founded in 1997 and located in Berkeley, California, from 2003 until April 30, 2008. Its stated goal was to strengthen democracy by providing intellectual support to the progressive community. The Rockridge Institute promoted progressive ideas and values, studied their implications, and worked to provide an effective articulation of those values to shift public discourse.

== Framing ==
Founded by the prominent cognitive linguist George Lakoff, the Rockridge Institute sought to examine the way that frames—which Lakoff describes as "the mental structures that influence our thinking, often unconsciously"—determine our opinions and values. Based on extensive research in human cognition, the Rockridge Institute argued that the way an issue is framed—the language used to describe it and the metaphors used to understand it—influences our political views as much, or more, than the particulars of a given policy.

Accordingly, the Rockridge Institute attempted to monitor the manipulative use of framing, particularly by right wing organizations and politicians, and to promote frames that encourage progressive thinking. A much discussed example of framing is the Bush administration's use of the phrase "war on terror" to describe its policies following the September 11th attacks. The use of the "war" metaphor, the Rockridge Institute and others contended, had a tremendous effect on U.S. policy and public debate. They further contended it has allowed the president to assume war powers, makes opposition to the "war" seem unpatriotic, and was used to justify the invasion of Iraq, although cooperation between Al-Qaeda and Saddam Hussein had not occurred. If the U.S. response to September 11 had been framed as a criminal proceeding, the Rockridge Institute and others argued, such extraordinary measures would never have garnered sufficient political support.

The Rockridge Institute sought to raise consciousness about manipulative framing and to propose progressive frames on a wide range of issues, including the economy, immigration, religion, and the environment.

In December 2005 the Rockridge Institute invited its participants to apply for the 25 openings for the Advisory Board for its on-line community of practice called the Rockridge Nation.

== Dissolution ==
The Rockridge Institute announced its closure in April 2008.

Cognitive Policy Works, an offshoot organization formed by former Rockridge fellows, maintains an online archive of Rockridge materials.

== See also ==
- Compound empowerment
- George Lakoff
- Glenn W. Smith
