= Glenn W. Smith =

American journalist

Glenn W Smith

Glenn W. Smith (born September 30, 1953 in Houston, Texas) is an author, activist and political consultant.

== Biography ==
Smith was a journalist for the Houston Chronicle from 1979 to 1985 and the Houston Post from 1985 to 1988. He covered state and national political affairs before leaving journalism to work for then-Texas Lt. Gov. Bill Hobby in early 1988. He subsequently worked for the late U.S. Senator Lloyd Bentsen, and managed Ann Richards' 1990 primary victory in her successful campaign for Governor of Texas.

Throughout the 1990s Smith designed public affairs campaigns for a variety of state and national clients. A managing director of Public Strategies, Inc., he wrote and produced award-winning communications for broadcast and direct mail, and designed communications strategies for business, universities, activist groups, and progressive candidates.

Smith left Public Strategies in 2001 and launched his own company, Affinity Dynamics, Inc. ADI provides strategic media, advertising and communications consulting to a variety of non-governmental organizations, businesses, political campaigns and advocacy groups. In 2003 Smith managed MoveOn.org's campaign against Tom DeLay's mid-decade congressional redistricting.

Smith has taught "religion and politics" at the Starr King School for the Ministry in Berkeley, California. He sponsored and organized national events with progressive religious leaders, including events challenging the Right Wing's "Justice Sunday" rallies in 2005, a celebration of Martin Luther King Jr. at Riverside Church in New York City, and "Freedom and Faith" bus tours throughout the northeast and mid-west.

Smith is the author of The Politics of Deceit (2004) and Unfit Commander (2004). He is director of the Texas Progress Council, a progressive think tank in Austin, and was a senior fellow at George Lakoff's Rockridge Institute in Berkeley.

== Works ==
- The Politics of Deceit (2004, Wiley)
