= Invariance principle (linguistics) =

Concept in cognitive linguistics

In cognitive linguistics, the invariance principle is a simple attempt to explain similarities and differences between how an idea is understood in "ordinary" usage, and how it is understood when used as a conceptual metaphor.

Kövecses (2002: 102) provides the following examples based on the semantics of the English verb to give:

She gave him a book. (source language)

Based on the metaphor CAUSATION IS TRANSFER we get:

(a) She gave him a kiss.
(b) She gave him a headache.

However, the metaphor does not work in exactly the same way in each case, as seen in:

(a') She gave him a kiss, and he still has it.
(b') She gave him a headache, and he still has it.

The invariance principle offers the hypothesis that metaphor only maps components of meaning from the source language that remain coherent in the target context. The components of meaning that remain coherent in the target context retain their "basic structure" in some sense, so this is a form of invariance.

George Lakoff and Mark Turner originated the idea under the name invariance hypothesis, later revising and renaming it. Lakoff (1993: 215) defines the invariance principle as: "Metaphorical mappings preserve the cognitive topology (that is, the image-schema structure) of the source domain, in a way consistent with the inherent structure of the target domain".

== See also ==
- Figure of speech
- Metonymy
- Trope (linguistics)

== Bibliography ==
- Barcelona, Antonio (2003). Metaphor and metonymy at the crossroads: a cognitive perspective. Second edition. Walter de Gruyter. ISBN 3-11-017556-8
- Glucksberg, Sam and Matthew S. McGlone (1999). "When love is not a journey: What metaphors mean". Journal of Pragmatics 31: 1541–1558. [abstract only]
- Kövecses, Zoltán (2002). Metaphor: a practical introduction. Oxford University Press US. ISBN 0-19-514511-9
- Lakoff, George. "The contemporary theory of metaphor"
- Lakoff, George. "What is a conceptual system"
- Lakoff, George and Mark Johnson (1980). Metaphors we live by.
- Lakoff, George and Mark Turner (1989). More than cool reason: a field guide to poetic metaphor.
- Yü, Ning (1998). The contemporary theory of metaphor: a perspective from Chinese. John Benjamins Publishing Company. ISBN 1-55619-201-0
