= TFT =

TFT may refer to:

== Electronics ==
- Thin-film transistor, a type of transistor commonly used in flat-screen displays
  - TFT LCD, a type of liquid-crystal display that uses thin-film transistor technology

== Gaming ==
- Teamfight Tactics, an auto battler game from League of Legends developer Riot Games
- Warcraft III: The Frozen Throne, an expansion to the video game Warcraft III
- The Fantasy Trip, a role playing game designed by Steve Jackson
- Task Force Talon, a faction from the video game Act of War: Direct Action

== Medicine and psychology ==
- Thyroid function tests, a collective term for blood tests used to check the function of the thyroid
- Thought field therapy, a pseudoscientific alternative medicine method
- Trifluridine, an antiviral and anticancer medication

== Music groups ==
- The Fire Theft, a rock band associated with Sunny Day Real Estate
- There for Tomorrow, an alternative band
- The Fabulous Thunderbirds, a blues-rock band

== Organizations ==
=== United States ===
- Task Force Tarawa, the 2nd Marine Brigade during the 2003 invasion of Iraq
- Texans for Truth, an American political action group
- Toys for Tots, a charitable program of the U.S. Marine Corps Reserve
- UCLA School of Theater, Film and Television, California

=== Elsewhere ===
- Thai Forest Tradition, a Thai lineage (or school) of Theravada Buddhism
- Théâtre français de Toronto, a French-language theatre company in Toronto, Canada

== Other uses ==
- Temporal fusion transformer, a type of transformer (deep learning)
- Ternate language, spoken on Indonesia's Maluku Islands (ISO 639-3 code: tft)
- Tit for tat, equivalent retaliation, in game theory
- Toy Fox Terrier, a breed of small dog
- The Friday Thing, a defunct UK current-affairs newsletter by The Friday Project
- TFT Racing, a French racing team
