= Fred Householder =

American linguist (1913–1994)

- Born: 1 February 1913
- Died: 4 January 1994 (aged 80)
- Education: Columbia University
- Scientific career
- Fields: Linguistics
- Institutions: Indiana University
- Doctoral students: George Lakoff

Fred Walter Householder Jr. (February 1, 1913 – January 4, 1994) was an American linguist and professor of classics and linguistics at Indiana University. His best known works include Linguistic Speculations (Cambridge, 1971) and his contributions to Readings in Linguistics II (University of Chicago, 1966).

== Life and work ==
Fred Walter Householder Jr. was an American linguist at Indiana University at Bloomington, Indiana. He received his training in classics from Columbia University, completing a PhD there in 1941. Householder held joint appointments in the departments of classics and linguistics at Indiana University from 1948 to 1983, and chaired the Department of Linguistics from 1974 to 1980.

Householder received the Guggenheim Fellowship in 1958, teaching at London University 1958–1959. He was elected to the American Academy of Arts and Sciences in 1977. He was elected vice president of the Linguistic Society of America in 1980, and president of the LSA in 1981.

Householder specialized in the study and theory of syntax, in languages from Greek and Latin to Chinese and Azerbaijani. In 1965, the first issue of the Journal of Linguistics published Householder's criticism of the work of Noam Chomsky and Morris Halle, challenging their work on phonology, in particular their methodology. Chomsky and Halle responded in the second issue, defending their work on the potential for phonology to unlock universal meanings in sound and speech.

He retired in 1983, and after his death in 1994, Indiana University established the Fred W. Householder Memorial Fund to provide scholarships to students specializing in Kurdish linguistics, one of the focuses of his research.

== Bibliography ==
- Householder, Fred W. Literary Quotation and Allusion in Lucian. New York: King's Crown Press, 1941.
- —. English for Greeks. Washington: American Council of Learned Societies, 1954.
- — and Sol Saporta, eds. Problems in Lexicography. Bloomington: Indiana University, 1962.
- — [with D. Axexander and P.H. Matthews]. Adjectives Before That-clauses In English. Bloomington: Indiana University, 1964 (reprinted 1977).
- —, Kostas Kazazis, and Andreas Koutsoudas. Reference Grammar of Literary Dhimotiki. Bloomington: Indiana University, 1964.
- —, and D. Alexander, W. J. Kunz. Some Classes Of Verbs In English. Bloomington: Indiana University, 1964.
- — [with Mansour Lofti]. Basic Course in Azerbaijani. Bloomington: Indiana University, 1965.
- — and Loraine Bridgeman. More Classes of Verbs in English. Bloomington: Indiana University Linguistics Club, 1965.
- — and Wolfgang Wölck, P H. Matthews, eds. A Preliminary Classification Of Adverbs In English. Bloomington: Indiana University, 1965.
- — and Eric Hamp, Robert Austerlitz, Martin Joos, eds. Readings in Linguistics II. Chicago: University of Chicago Press, 1966 (reprinted 1995).
- —. Linguistic Speculations. Cambridge: Cambridge University Press, 1971 (reprinted 2011).
- — and Gregory Nagy. Greek: a survey of recent work. from "Janua linguarum: Series practica v. 211". The Hague: Mouton, 1972.
- —, ed. Structuralist: selected readings. Harmondsworth: Penguin, 1972.
- — [with Costas Kazazis]. Greek triglossia. from "Studies in modern Greek for American students". Bloomington: Indiana University Linguistics Club, 1974.
- —. Universe-scope relations in Chinese and Japanese. Bloomington: Indiana University Linguistics Club, 1980.
- —. The syntax of Apollonius Dyscolus. Amsterdam : Benjamins, 1981.
