= Tertium comparationis =

Point of comparison

Tertium comparationis (Latin for "the third [part] of the comparison") is the quality that two things which are being compared have in common. It is the point of comparison which prompted the author of the comparison in question to liken someone or something to someone or something else in the first place.

If a comparison visualizes an action, state, quality, object, or a person by means of a parallel which is drawn to a different entity, the two things which are being compared do not necessarily have to be identical. However, they must possess at least one quality in common. This common quality has traditionally been referred to as tertium comparationis.

The most common devices used to achieve this are metaphors and similes, especially, but by no means exclusively, in poetic language. In many cases one aspect of the comparison is implied rather than made explicit. The New Testament scholar Adolf Jülicher applied the concept of tertium comparationis to the parables of Jesus. According to Jülicher, a parable or similitude (extended simile or metaphor) has three parts: a picture part (Bildhälfte), a reality part (Sachhälfte), and the point of comparison (tertium comparationis) between the picture part and the reality part. "The kingdom of heaven is like treasure hidden in a field, which someone found and hid; then in his joy he goes and sells all that he has and buys that field" (Matthew 13:44). In this parable, the picture part is the hidden treasure, the reality part is God's kingdom, and the tertium comparationis is the inestimable value of the kingdom.

== Examples ==
- Necessity is the mother of invention. (English proverb)

Objects of comparison: relationship between mother and child, relationship between necessity and invention
Tertium comparationis: source, where something derives from

- Woman is the nigger of the world. (John Lennon)

Objects of comparison: treatment of Black people in US culture, treatment of women in global culture
Tertium comparationis: inhumane treatment, subjugation, discrimination

- Goodbye, England's rose. (Elton John on the death of Diana, Princess of Wales)

Objects of comparison: Diana; roses
Tertium comparationis: beauty

- If they [our two souls] be two, they are two so

As stiff twin compasses are two;
Thy soul, the fixed foot, makes no show
To move, but doth, if th'other do.

(John Donne: "A Valediction: Forbidding Mourning") (Read the whole poem.)

Objects of comparison: two souls; twin compasses
Tertium comparationis: a non-physical link between separate objects that causes action in one to result in action to the other.
