= Metaphor identification procedure =

Metaphor identification procedure (MIP) is a method for identifying metaphorically used words in discourse. It can be used to recognize metaphors in spoken and written language. Mainly intended for scholars, it can be helpful in empirical research. The procedure aims to determine the relationship of a particular lexical unit in the discourse and recognize its use in a particular context as possibly metaphorical. Since many words can be considered metaphorical in different contexts, MIP requires a clear distinction between words that convey metaphorical meaning and those that do not, despite the fact that language generally differs in the degrees of metaphoricity. A group of scholars called Pragglejaz started the Pragglejaz procedure in 2007, and elaborated on a detailed method of identifying metaphors. Note that this method does not deal with an author's possible intention to express metaphorical meanings, and does not identify metaphorical utterances and conventional linguistic metaphors. It also does not indicate ordinary procedures people use to determine metaphors or exclude other possible non-literalness.
