= Dead metaphor =

Figure of speech which has lost its original imagery

A dead metaphor is a figure of speech which has lost the original imagery of its meaning by extensive, repetitive, and popular usage, or because it refers to an obsolete technology or forgotten custom. Because dead metaphors have a conventional meaning that differs from the original, they can be understood without knowing their earlier connotation.

== Description ==
Dead metaphors are generally the result of a semantic shift in the evolution of a language, a process called the literalization of a metaphor. A distinction is often made between those dead metaphors whose origins are entirely unknown to the majority of people using them (such as the expression "to kick the bucket") and those whose source is widely known or symbolism easily understood but not often thought about (the idea of "falling in love").

The long-standing metaphorical application of a term can similarly lose their metaphorical quality, coming simply to denote a larger application of the term. The wings of a plane now no longer seem to metaphorically refer to a bird's wings; rather, the term 'wing' was expanded to include non-living things. Similarly, the legs of a chair is no longer a metaphor but an expansion of the term "leg" to include any supporting pillar.

There is debate among literary scholars whether so-called "dead metaphors" are dead or are metaphors. Literary scholar R.W. Gibbs noted that for a metaphor to be dead, it would necessarily lose the metaphorical qualities that it comprises. These qualities, however, still remain. A person can understand the expression "falling head-over-heels in love" even if they have never encountered that variant of the phrase "falling in love". Analytic philosopher Max Black argued that the dead metaphor should not be considered a metaphor at all, but rather classified as a separate vocabulary item.

In addition, philosophers such as Colin Murray Turbayne and Kendall Walton have outlined the manner in which "dead metaphors" may continue to exert influence upon a user's thoughts long after their metaphorical properties have seemingly vanished. Their research illustrates the manner in which "dead metaphors" have often become incorporated into accepted scientific and philosophical theories while also contributing to considerable obfuscation of thought over time.

== Examples ==
- Balls-out (in reference to a centrifugal governor)
- Balls to the wall (in reference to grips on aircraft controls)
- Brand new
- Beyond the pale (in reference to a boundary fence)
- Cold enough to freeze the balls off a brass monkey
- Cut! (in film)
- Close, but no cigar
- Deadline
- Footage (in film)
- Hang up the phone
- Go hell-for-leather (refers to horse riding)
- Hold your horses
- Three sheets to the wind (refers to a storm-tossed sailing ship)
- To take a parting shot (Parthian shot)
- Patching code (refers to paper tape)
- Pull out all the stops (in reference to a pipe organ)
- Rewind (in reference to magnetic tape)
- Roll up the window
- Sound like a broken record
- To tape something (to record)
- On tenterhooks (tenterhooks are metal hooks used to stretch out cloth on a frame)
- Time is running out (in reference to an hourglass)
