= Raymond W. Gibbs Jr. =

American psychology professor

Raymond W. Gibbs Jr. is a former psychology professor and researcher at the University of California, Santa Cruz. His research interests are in the fields of experimental psycholinguistics and cognitive science. His work concerns a range of theoretical issues, ranging from questions about the role of embodied experience in thought and language, to looking at people's use and understanding of figurative language (e.g., metaphor, irony, idioms). Raymond Gibbs's research is especially focused on bodily experience and linguistic meaning. Much of his research is motivated by theories of meaning in philosophy, linguistics, and comparative literature.

== Education ==
Gibbs received his Bachelor of Arts in Cognitive Science from Hampshire College in 1976. Then he went on to study at the University of California, San Diego and received his master's degree in Experimental Psychology in 1978, and his Ph.D. in Cognitive Psychology and Psycholinguistics in 1980.

== Professional positions ==
- (1991–1995) Chair, Department of Psychology, University of California, Santa Cruz
- (2013–2017) Distinguished Professor of Psychology, University of California, Santa Cruz
- (1990–2013) Professor of Psychology, University of California, Santa Cruz
- (1986–1990) Associate Professor of Psychology, University of California, Santa Cruz
- (1982–1986) Assistant Professor of Psychology, University of California, Santa Cruz
- (1981–1982) Postdoctoral Fellow in Cognitive Science, Stanford University
- (1980–1981) Postdoctoral Research Associate in Cognitive Science, Yale University

=== Services ===
- Former Editor of Metaphor and Symbol (2001–2018)
- Associate Editor of the Journal of Mental Imagery

==== Current member of editorial boards for these scholarly journals ====
- Cognitive Linguistics
- Discourse Processes
- Journal of Pragmatics
- Intercultural Pragmatics
- Psychologia
- Poetics
- International Journal of Cognitive Linguistics
- Pragmatics and Society
- Metaphor in the Social World
- Scientific Study of Literature
- Israeli Journal of Humor Research
- Lodz Papers in Pragmatics

==== Editorial boards for book series ====
- Human Cognitive Processing (Benjamins)
- Linguistic Approaches to Literature (Benjamins)
- Mouton Series in Pragmatics (Mouton)
- Cognitive Linguistic Studies of Language Cognition in Cultural Contexts (Benjamins)
- Metaphor in Language
- Cognition, and Communication (Benjamins)
- Topics in Humor Research (Benjamins)

==== Previous services ====
- Senior Editor for Cognitive Science
- Editorial board member for Journal of Memory and Language
- Co-editor of book series: Human Cognitive Processing (Benjamins)

== Research ==
=== Embodied experience in thought and language ===
One of Gibbs' main focuses of his research is on embodiment. His 2006 book Embodiment and Cognitive Science provides a large body of evidence to support the embodiment premise. This concept of embodiment "refers to understanding the role of an agent's own body in its everyday, situated cognition". Gibbs promotes a dynamic framework of embodiment that differs from the more traditional reductionist model of cognition. Gibbs says that embodiment refers not only to neural events but also to cognitive unconscious and to phenomenological experience. Gibbs discusses the relationship between body and consciousness from many different viewpoints and talks about the epistemological opposition between realism and idealism.

What's the difference between "embodied metaphor" and "abstraction from experience"? Gibbs' claim that abstract concepts arise by metaphor from embodied reality is sometimes hard to distinguish from the traditional empiricist view. For the most part same evidence can be used to support both views. Gibbs admits that the metaphor, which forms an abstract concept, does not preserve all aspects of the original bodily experience; so abstraction from experience might be a better term. The real originality of the embodied metaphor view is the claim that something of the embodied nature of the original experience still operates whenever an abstract concept is used. Gibbs states that the original experience persists in a schematic form called an image schema. He defines image schemas as analog representations of spatial relations and movements in space. For example, Gibbs lists a number of bodily experiences of the form "Some part of the body is too hot/cold/etc.". He states that these are all instances of a single image schema, the balance schema. This image schema is claimed to be used in many kinds of abstract thought. For instance, in Hamlet's speech "To be or not to be", Gibbs says that "one quickly recognizes" is an allusion to the balance schema because it involves making a difficult decision.

More recently, Gibbs conducted an experiment in order to examine people's embodied understanding of metaphorical narratives. Participants listened to one of two different, but similar stories about a relationship. One of the stories consisted of a successful relationship and the other did not. The stories were also described in metaphorical terms like "your relationship was moving along in a good direction" or not such as "your relationship was very important to you." Participants were then blindfolded and asked to accurately walk, or imagine walking, to a marker a distance away while they thought about the story they just heard. Participants who heard about the successful metaphorical story walked longer and further than those presented with the unsuccessful relationship story. These walking and imagining differences disappeared when the metaphorical statement "moving along in a good direction" was replaced by a non-metaphorical expression. This experiment that Gibbs set up suggests that people's understanding of metaphorical narratives is partly based on their embodied simulations of the metaphorical actions referred to in speech.

Gibbs and Marlene Johansson Falck, in order to help solidify his position on embodiment of metaphorical meanings also used other studies to demonstrate this. The results of two specific studies of his show how bodily experiences with real world items partly constrains not only how specific metaphors emerge, but also how different metaphorical understandings are applied in speech about abstract entities. The first of these two studies was on people's imagery for both "paths" and "roads". By asking participants to imagine themselves being on a path or being on a road and then asking them questions about their mental image such as: "Is it likely that there will be obstacles along your way? Or is it likely to be paved?". It can be seen that people give different answers to these questions depending on whether they were asked to imagine being on a road or being on a path. This was done so that it could be determined what types of properties are associated with each paths and roads. The results of this study found that most people think of paths as being more problematic to travel on, more aimless in their direction, something that stops are more frequent on, and most likely traveled on by foot as opposed to a vehicle of some sort. Roads were found to be thought of as complete opposite, viewed as straight, wide, paved, and having a specific destination that they lead to. Gibbs states this shows that people's understanding of paths and roads leans more towards the central aspects of their bodily actions. The second study that they used examined the metaphorical functions of both the words "path" and "road" in speech. They found that when people use these words metaphorically it is linked to their embodied understanding of these words. For example, "Instead of introducing procedures which can be relied upon to identify and protect all those at risk of human rights violations in their own country, Government has introduced a range of measures which create obstacles in the path of those seeking asylum in the UK." The word path is used in this sentence in because there are obstacles in the way of those seeking asylum in the UK. And an example of how embodied understanding of a road affects how it is used metaphorically would be in this sentence; "But West Germany, always cautious about monetary union, has shrugged aside attempts by the Italians to bring forward by several months the start of the inter-governmental conference that will discuss the road to EMU."

=== Looking at use and understanding of figurative language ===
==== Metaphors ====
Gibbs does most of his research working with metaphor and how people understand and use them in speech. Linguistic metaphors, such as resemblance metaphors which are in the form of "A is B" are seen as expressing common characteristics between the A and the B in the form "A is B". For example, "lawyers are sharks" is not meant to be taken literally as it is a metaphor, but it is a way to infer that lawyers and sharks share the same qualities such as aggressiveness, and ceaseless effort to attain their goals with little regard to others in their path. Gibbs says these metaphorical statements do not just assert a meaning, they can also strengthen already existing assumptions about lawyers and therefore can be used in a social pragmatic way. Gibbs conducted a couple of experiments in order to examine whether people inferred different pragmatic message when reading both metaphors and non-metaphors, the speed in which they could understand them. And also in comparing the effort needed to infer pragmatic messages between the two types. The first experiment was aimed to find out if could infer different pragmatic messages form metaphorical phrases. Gibbs found that in general, people understand not only the metaphorical meanings of the statements, but that they also can have different pragmatic implications for different contexts. He then did the same thing but this time without metaphorical phrases and found that pragmatic messages associated with understand non-metaphors is about the same as those associated with interpreting metaphors.

Gibbs also did some research on XYZ metaphors and how people interpret and explain them. He found that there are many different ways in which people are able to do this. Gibbs names several theoretical perspectives that could explain the different aspects of the data that they collected. Such as conceptual blending theory, conceptual metaphor theory, and relevance theory. A comparison view says that people begin processing a metaphor by first lining up the representations of both the source and the target concepts. He also mentions that there is an alternative view that claims metaphors are understood better when using class-inclusion categorization processes instead of comparison statement. Gibbs mentions that it is not yet clear to present a theories that is better than the others to explain his interpretive results. However he does say that it is clear that "any future theoretical proposal on XYZ metaphors must deal with the complexity of people's interpretations, and not simply assume that all XYZ metaphors express the same type of meaning at the same level of detail."

==== Irony ====
Gibbs argues with the common assumptions that irony is a deliberate pragmatic action. He says that ironic acts may not be as "deliberate" in their creation and use as it is often said they are. He especially thinks this in the sense that ironic meanings arise from completely conscious states of mind. Gibbs proposes a dynamical view of intentional action that explains more thoroughly the psychological complexities of how ironic acts are created and understood. There are many different types of irony but ironic speech is very much a deliberate way to communicate. Speakers chose to use these ironic statements for a variety of social reasons. Gibbs however, says that there are cases in which a speaker's speech is understood as ironic even though there is clear recognition that the comment was not meant to be taken in that manner. An example Gibbs' uses to show this is if two students were cheating on an exam together and then afterwards one of them says "I would never be involved in any cheating." This is clearly meant to be ironic to both the speaker and the listener. However, if you take just a slightly different story such as two students were taking a test and one of them copied off of the other without their knowledge. Than after the test someone asked the person who didn't know he was copied off of, "do you cheat?" he answered, "I would never be involved in any cheating." Now this sentence was not meant to be ironic, however the student that cheated off of him may take this as ironic even though it was not intended to be. Gibbs uses this to show how unintentional irony is not an unusual phenomenon and that we as humans are quite capable to interpret these phrases and events as ironic without needing to contemplate the original deliberate intent of the person or people the speech or acts originated from.

==== Idioms ====
Gibbs does some research into idioms in conversation and how people understand and interpret them. In order to investigate people's comprehension of idioms that can have both a literal meaning and also an idiomatic meaning, Gibbs conducted an experiment where he had participants read stories one line at a time and the very last line in the story was an idiomatic expression. After the subject was finished reading that sentence they were asked to paraphrase it. Gibbs recorded the time it took participants to paraphrase these idiomatic expressions. He then did this same procedure except omitted the story and just had the participants read the idiomatic expression, this time he noticed that more incorrect understanding of the meaning of the idiom was occurring when there was no context. In conjunction with the times that were recorded and the frequency of errors in each given group Gibbs concluded that, "While idiomatic expressions are more familiar, literal interpretations of these expressions are better recalled. In other words, under normal circumstances of conversation, people remember unconventional uses of idioms better than conventional uses."

== Publications ==
=== Books and edited collections ===
- Gibbs, R. (1994). The poetics of mind: Figurative thought, language, and understanding. New York: Cambridge University Press. (also translated into Italian, Korean, Spanish, and Japanese).
- Gibbs, R. (1999). Intentions in the experience of meaning. New York: Cambridge University Press.
- Gibbs, R. (2006). Embodiment and cognitive science. New York: Cambridge University Press. (also translated into Portuguese).
- Gibbs, R., & Colston, H. (2012). Interpreting figurative meaning. New York: Cambridge University Press.
- Katz, A., Cacciari, C., Gibbs, R., & Turner, M. (1998). Figurative language and thought. New York: Oxford University Press.
- Gibbs, R. (Ed.) (2008). Cambridge handbook of metaphor and thought. New York: Cambridge University Press.
- Gibbs, R., & Steen, G. (Eds.). (1999). Metaphor in cognitive linguistics. Amsterdam: Benjamins.
- Gibbs, R., & Colston, H. (Eds.) (2007). Irony in language and thought: A cognitive science reader. New York: Erlbaum.
- Gibbs, R., & Gerrig, R. (Eds.) (1989). Special invited issue: Context and metaphor comprehension. Metaphor and Symbolic Activity, 3, 123–201.

=== Selected articles ===
- Gibbs, R. (1980). "Spilling the beans on understanding and memory for idioms in conversation". Memory & Cognition, 8, 149–156.
- Gibbs, R. (1982). "A critical examination of the contribution of literal meaning to understanding nonliteral discourse". Text, 2, 9–27.
- Gibbs, R. (1984). "Literal meaning and psychological theory". Cognitive Science, 8, 275–304.
- Gibbs, R. (1986). "On the psycholinguistics of sarcasm". Journal of Experimental Psychology: General, 115, 3–15. Reprinted In R. Gibbs & H. Colston (Eds.), Irony in language and thought: A cognitive science reader. Mahwah, N.J.: Erlbaum.
- Gerrig, R., & Gibbs, R. (1988). "Beyond the lexicon: Creativity in language production". Metaphor and Symbolic Activity, 3, 1–19.
- Gibbs, R. (1990). "The process of understanding literary metaphor". Journal of Literary Semantics, 19, 65–94.
- Gibbs, R. (1992). "Metaphor, mental imagery, and dream cognition". Journal of Mental Imagery, 16, 103–108.
- Gibbs, R., & Kearney, L. (1994). "When parting is such sweet sorrow: The comprehension and appreciation of oxymora". Journal of Psycholinguistic Research, 23, 75–89.
- Gibbs, R. (1996). "Why many concepts are metaphorical". Cognition, 61, 309–319.
- Colston, H., & Gibbs, R. (1998). "Analogy and irony: Rebuttal to 'rebuttal analogy'". Metaphor and Symbol, 13, 69–76.
- Gibbs, R. (2000). "Irony in talk among friends". Metaphor and Symbol, 15, 5–27. Reprinted In R. Gibbs & H. Colston (Eds.), Irony in language and thought: A cognitive science reader. Mahwah, N.J.: Erlbaum.
- Colston, H., & Gibbs, R. (2002). "Are irony and metaphor understood differently?" Metaphor and Symbol, 17, 57–60.
- Steen, G., & Gibbs, R. (2004). "Questions about metaphor in literature". European Journal of English Studies, 8, 337–354.
- Gibbs, R., Gould, J., & Andric, M. (2005–2006). "Imagining metaphorical actions: Embodied simulations make the impossible plausible". Imagination, Cognition, and Personality, 25, 221–238.
- Gibbs, R., & Bryant, G. (2008). "Striving for optimal relevance in answering questions". Cognition, 106, 345–369.
- Gibbs, R. (2010). "Stability and variation in linguistic pragmatics". Pragmatics and Society, 1, 32–49.
- Okanski, L., & Gibbs, R. (2010). "Art is the sex of the imagination: Explaining the meanings of XYZ metaphors". Textus, 23, 699–720.
- Gibbs, R. (2012). "The social nature of embodied cognition: A view from the world of metaphor". Intellectica, 56, 81–98.
