= Andrew Goatly =

English language professor

Andrew Goatly is an English language professor at Lingnan University in Hong Kong.

== Career ==
Goatly studied English at Jesus College, Oxford before working for Voluntary Service Overseas in Rwanda and Thailand. On returning to the United Kingdom he worked as a schoolteacher before obtaining a doctorate at University College, London and thereafter teaching at Chiang Mai University in Thailand, the National University of Singapore and Lingnan University, Hong Kong. He has written:

- The Language of Metaphors, published by Routledge
- Washing the Brain: metaphor and hidden ideology, published by John Benjamins
- Explorations in Stylistics, published by Equinox
- Meaning and Humour, published by Cambridge University Press.
- Critical Reading and Writing in the Digital Age, published by Routledge
- Two Dimensions of Meaning: Similarity and Contiguity in Language, Culture and Ecology, published by Routledge.
- Metaphor, Metonymy and Lexicogenesis, published by John Benjamins
- Why We Can't Think Straight: An essay on straightness as metaphor and symbol, published by Applied Linguistics press
