= Mark Johnson (philosopher) =

American philosopher (born 1949)

- Born: Mark Leonard Johnson; 24 May 1949 (age 77); Kansas City, Missouri, U.S.

Education
- Education: University of Chicago
- Thesis: An Irreducibility Theory of Metaphor (1977)
- Doctoral advisor: Ted Cohen; Paul Ricœur

Philosophical work
- Era: Contemporary philosophy
- Region: Western philosophy
- School: Pragmatism
- Institutions: University of Oregon; Southern Illinois University
- Main interests: Epistemology

Mark Leonard Johnson (born 24 May 1949) is an American philosopher who is Knight Professor of Liberal Arts and Sciences in the Department of Philosophy at the University of Oregon. He is known for contributions to embodied philosophy, cognitive science, and cognitive linguistics, some of which he has coauthored with George Lakoff, such as Metaphors We Live By. He has also published on philosophical topics such as John Dewey, Immanuel Kant, and ethics.

== Bibliography ==
- Morality for Humans: Ethical Understanding from the Perspective of Cognitive Science, University of Chicago Press, 2014.
- The Meaning of the Body: Aesthetics of Human Understanding, University of Chicago Press, 2007.
- Philosophy in the Flesh: The Embodied Mind and Its Challenge to Western Thought (coauthored with George Lakoff), Basic Books, 1999.
- Moral Imagination: Implications of Cognitive Science for Ethics, University of Chicago Press, 1993.
- The Body in the Mind: The Bodily Basis of Meaning, Imagination, and Reason, University of Chicago Press, 1987.
- Philosophical Perspectives on Metaphor, University of Minnesota, 1981.
- Metaphors We Live By (coauthored with George Lakoff), University of Chicago Press, 1980; revised 2003.

== See also ==
- American philosophy
