= George Lakoff =

American linguist (born 1941)

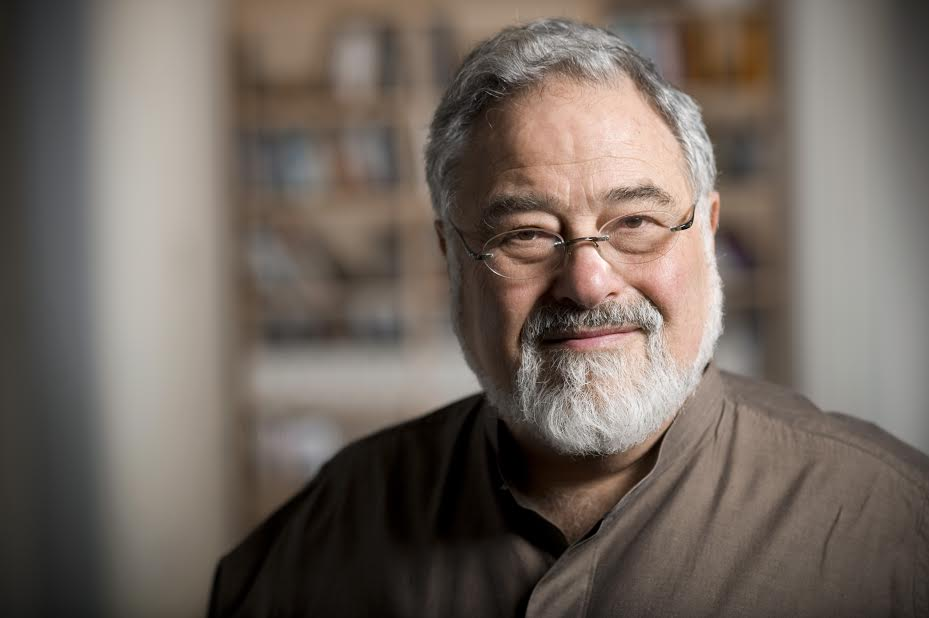
- Lakoff, 2012
- Born: George Philip Lakoff; May 24, 1941 (age 85); Bayonne, New Jersey, U.S.
- Known for: Conceptual metaphor theory; Embodied cognition
- Spouses: Robin Lakoff (m. 1964; div. 1975): Kathleen Frumkin

Academic background
- Education: Indiana University; MIT
- Doctoral advisor: Fred Householder
- Other advisor: Noam Chomsky

Academic work
- Discipline: Cognitive linguistics; Cognitive science
- Institutions: University of California, Berkeley
- Website: george-lakoff.com

George Philip Lakoff (/ˈleɪkɔːf/ LAY-kawf; born May 24, 1941) is an American cognitive linguist and philosopher, best known for his thesis that people's lives are significantly influenced by the conceptual metaphors they use to explain complex phenomena. Lakoff served as professor of linguistics at the University of California, Berkeley, from 1972 until his retirement in 2016.

The conceptual metaphor thesis, introduced in his and Mark Johnson's 1980 book Metaphors We Live By has found applications in a number of academic disciplines. Applying it to politics, literature, philosophy and mathematics has led Lakoff into territory normally considered basic to political science. In his 1996 book Moral Politics, Lakoff described conservative voters as being influenced by the "strict father model" as a central metaphor for such a complex phenomenon as the state, and liberal/progressive voters as being influenced by the "nurturant parent model" as the folk psychological metaphor for this complex phenomenon.

According to Lakoff, an individual's experience and attitude towards sociopolitical issues are influenced by being framed in linguistic constructions. In Metaphor and War: The Metaphor System Used to Justify War in the Persian Gulf (1991), he argued that the American involvement in the Persian Gulf War was obscured or "spun" by the metaphors which were used by the first Bush administration to justify it. Between 2003 and 2008, Lakoff was involved with a progressive think tank, the now defunct Rockridge Institute.

Lakoff is a member of the scientific committee of the Fundación IDEAS (IDEAS Foundation), Spain's Socialist Party's think tank. The more general theory that elaborated his thesis is known as embodied mind. His first marriage was to linguist Robin Lakoff.

== Work ==
=== Reappraisal of metaphor ===
Although some of Lakoff's research involves questions traditionally pursued by linguists – such as the conditions under which a certain linguistic construction is grammatically viable –, he has become best known for his reappraisal of the role that metaphors play in the socio-political activity of humans. The Western scientific tradition has seen metaphor as a purely linguistic construction. The essential thrust of Lakoff's work has been to argue that metaphors are a primarily conceptual construction and are in fact central to the development of thought.

In his words: "Our ordinary conceptual system, in terms of which we both think and act, is fundamentally metaphorical in nature." According to Lakoff, non-metaphorical thought is possible only when we talk about purely physical reality; the greater the level of abstraction, the more layers of metaphor are required to express that abstraction. People do not notice these metaphors for various reasons, including that some metaphors become "dead" in the sense that we no longer recognize their origin. Another reason is that we just do not "see" what is "going on". For instance, according to Lakoff, the notion that "argument is war" serves as the underlying metaphor in intellectual debate – a formulation he later revised to "argument is struggle":

- He won the argument.
- Your claims are indefensible.
- He shot down all my arguments.
- His criticisms were right on target.
- If you use that strategy, he'll wipe you out.

According to Lakoff, the development of thought has been the process of developing better metaphors. He also points out that the application of one domain of knowledge to another offers new perceptions and understandings.

=== Linguistics wars ===
Lakoff began his career as a student and later as a teacher of the theory of transformational grammar developed by Massachusetts Institute of Technology professor Noam Chomsky. In the late 1960s, however, he joined with others to promote generative semantics as an alternative to Chomsky's generative syntax. In an interview he stated:

During that period, I was attempting to unify Chomsky's transformational grammar with formal logic. I had helped work out a lot of the early details of Chomsky's theory of grammar. Noam claimed then — and still does, so far as I can tell — that syntax is independent of meaning, context, background knowledge, memory, cognitive processing, communicative intent, and every aspect of the body...In working through the details of his early theory, I found quite a few cases where semantics, context, and other such factors entered into rules governing the syntactic occurrences of phrases and morphemes. I came up with the beginnings of an alternative theory in 1963 and, along with wonderful collaborators like "Haj" Ross and Jim McCawley, developed it through the sixties.

Lakoff's claim that Chomsky asserts independence between syntax and semantics has been rejected by Chomsky, who expressed the following view in 1965:

A decision as to the boundary separating syntax and semantics (if there is one) is not a prerequisite for theoretical and descriptive study of syntactic and semantic rules. On the contrary, the problem of delimitation will clearly remain open until these fields are much better understood than they are today. Exactly the same can be said about the boundary separating semantic systems from systems of knowledge and belief. That these seem to interpenetrate in obscure ways has long been noted….

In response to Lakoff's making the above claim about Chomsky's view, Chomsky claimed that Lakoff has "virtually no comprehension of the work he is discussing". This rift between Generative Grammar and Generative Semantics led to fierce, acrimonious debates among linguists that have come to be known as the "linguistics wars".

=== Embodied mind ===
When Lakoff claims the mind is "embodied", he is arguing that almost all of human cognition, up through the most abstract reasoning, depends on and makes use of such concrete and "low-level" facilities as the sensorimotor system and the emotions. Therefore, embodiment is a rejection not only of dualism vis-a-vis mind and matter, but also of claims that human reason can be basically understood without reference to the underlying "implementation details". Lakoff offers three complementary but distinct arguments in favor of embodiment:

- First, using evidence from neuroscience and neural-network simulations, he argues that certain concepts - such as color and spatial relation concepts (e.g. "red" or "over"; see also qualia) - can be almost entirely understood through the examination of how processes of perception or motor control work.
- Second, based on cognitive linguistics' analysis of figurative language, he argues that the reasoning we use for such abstract topics as warfare, economics, or morality is somehow rooted in the reasoning we use for such mundane topics as spatial relationships (see conceptual metaphor).
- Finally, based on research in cognitive psychology and some investigations in the philosophy of language, he argues that very few of the categories used by humans are actually of the black-and-white type amenable to analysis in terms of necessary and sufficient conditions. On the contrary, most categories are supposed to be much more complicated and messy, just like our bodies. "We are neural beings", Lakoff states, "Our brains take their input from the rest of our bodies. What our bodies are like and how they function in the world thus structures the very concepts we can use to think. We cannot think just anything — only what our embodied brains permit."

Lakoff envisages consciousness as neurally embodied, however he explicitly states that the mechanism is not just neural computation alone. Using the concept of disembodiment, Lakoff supports the physicalist approach to the afterlife. If the soul can not have any of the properties of the body, then Lakoff claims it can not feel, perceive, think, be conscious, or have a personality. If this is true, then Lakoff asks what would be the point of the afterlife? Many scientists share the belief that there are problems with falsifiability and foundation ontologies purporting to describe "what exists", to a sufficient degree of rigor to establish a reasonable method of empirical validation. But Lakoff takes this further to explain why hypotheses built with complex metaphors cannot be directly falsified. Instead, they can only be rejected based on interpretations of empirical observations guided by other complex metaphors. This is what he means when he says that falsifiability itself can never be established by any reasonable method that would not rely ultimately on a shared human bias. The bias he's referring to is the set of conceptual metaphors governing how people interpret observations.

Lakoff is, with coauthors Mark Johnson and Rafael E. Núñez, one of the primary proponents of the embodied mind thesis. Lakoff discussed these themes in his 2001 Gifford Lectures at the University of Glasgow, published as The Nature and Limits of Human Understanding. Others who have written about the embodied mind include philosopher Andy Clark (See his Being There), philosophers and neurobiologists Humberto Maturana and Francisco Varela and Varela's student Evan Thompson, roboticists such as Rodney Brooks, Rolf Pfeifer and Tom Ziemke, the physicist David Bohm (see his Thought As A System), Ray Gibbs (see his Embodiment and Cognitive Science), John Grinder and Richard Bandler in their neuro-linguistic programming, and Julian Jaynes. The work of these writers can be traced back to earlier philosophical writings, most notably in the phenomenological tradition, such as Maurice Merleau-Ponty (1908–1961) and Heidegger (1889–1976). The basic thesis of "embodied mind" is also traceable to the American contextualist or pragmatist tradition, notably to John Dewey in such works as Art as Experience (1934).

=== Mathematics ===
According to Lakoff, even mathematics is subjective to the human species and its cultures: thus "any question of math's being inherent in physical reality is moot, since there is no way to know whether or not it is". By this, he is saying that there is nothing outside of the thought structures we derive from our embodied minds that we can use to "prove" that mathematics is somehow beyond biology. Lakoff and Rafael E. Núñez (2000) argue at length that mathematical and philosophical ideas are best understood in light of the embodied mind. The philosophy of mathematics ought therefore to look to the current scientific understanding of the human body as a foundation ontology, and should abandon self-referential attempts to ground the operational components of mathematics in anything other than "meat".

Mathematical reviewers have generally been critical of Lakoff and Núñez, pointing to mathematical errors. Lakoff claims that these errors have been corrected in subsequent printings. Although Lakoff and Núñez's book attempts a refutation of some of the most widely accepted viewpoints in the philosophy of mathematics and advice for how the field might proceed, its authors have yet to elicit much of a reaction from philosophers of mathematics themselves. The small community specializing in the psychology of mathematical learning, to which Núñez belongs, is paying attention.

Lakoff has also claimed that we should remain agnostic about whether mathematics is somehow wrapped up with the very nature of the universe. Early in 2001 Lakoff told the American Association for the Advancement of Science (AAAS): "Mathematics may or may not be out there in the world, but there's no way that we scientifically could possibly tell." This is because the structures of scientific knowledge are not "out there" but rather in our brains, based on the details of our anatomy. Therefore, we cannot "tell" that mathematics is "out there" without relying on conceptual metaphors rooted in our biology. This claim bothers those who believe that there really is a way we could "tell". The falsifiability of this claim is perhaps the central problem in the cognitive science of mathematics, a field that attempts to establish a foundation ontology based on the human cognitive and scientific process.

== Political significance and involvement ==
Lakoff has publicly expressed some of his political views and his ideas about the conceptual structures that he feels are central to understanding the political process. He almost always discusses the former in terms of the latter. Moral Politics (1996, revisited in 2002) gives book-length consideration to the conceptual metaphors that Lakoff sees as present in the minds of American "liberals" and "conservatives". The book is a blend of cognitive science and political analysis. Lakoff endeavors to keep his personal views confined to the last third of the book, where he explicitly argues for the superiority of the liberal vision.

Lakoff argues that the differences in opinion between liberals and conservatives follow from the fact that they subscribe with different strength to two different central metaphors about the relationship of the state to its citizens. Both, he contends, see governance through metaphors of the family. Conservatives generally subscribe more strongly to a model that Lakoff calls the "strict father model" that has a family structured around a strong, dominant "father" (government), and assumes that the "children" (citizens) need to be disciplined to be made into responsible "adults" (morality, self-financing). Once the "children" are "adults", though, the "father" should not interfere with their lives: the government should stay out of the business of those in society who have proved their personal responsibility.

In contrast, Lakoff argues that liberals place more support in a model of the family, which he calls the "nurturant parent model", that is based on "nurturant values", where both "mothers" and "fathers" work to keep the essentially good "children" away from "corrupting influences" (pollution, social injustice, poverty, etc.). Lakoff says that most people actually have a mixture of both metaphors which are applied at different times, and that political speech works primarily by invoking these metaphors and urging people to subscribe to one over the other.

Lakoff further argues that one of the reasons liberals have had difficulty since the 1980s is that they have not been as aware of their own guiding metaphors, and have too often accepted conservative terminology framed in a way to promote the strict father metaphor. Lakoff insists that liberals must cease using terms like partial birth abortion and tax relief because they are manufactured specifically to allow the possibilities of only certain types of opinions. Tax relief for example, implies explicitly that taxes are an affliction, something someone would want "relief" from. To use the terms of another metaphoric worldview, Lakoff insists, is to unconsciously support it. Liberals must support linguistic think tanks in the same way that conservatives do if they are going to succeed in appealing to those in the country who share their metaphors.

Lakoff offers advice about how to counteract politicians' lies. He maintains that the act of stating that a lie is false reinforces the lie because it repeats the way the lie is framed. Instead, he recommends what he calls a "truth sandwich":

"1. Start with the truth. The first frame gets the advantage.
2. Indicate the lie. Avoid amplifying the specific language if possible.
3. Return to the truth. Always repeat truths more than lies."

Lakoff calls this a "truth sandwich" even though the baloney is in the middle. The position of the lie avoids both primacy and recency effects.

Between 2003 and 2008, Lakoff was involved with a progressive think tank, the Rockridge Institute, an involvement that follows in part from his recommendations in Moral Politics. Among his activities with the institute, which concentrates in part on helping liberal candidates and politicians with re-framing political metaphors, Lakoff has given numerous public lectures and written accounts of his message from Moral Politics. In 2008, Lakoff joined Fenton Communications, the nation's largest public interest communications firm, as a Senior Consultant. One of his political works, Don't Think of an Elephant! Know Your Values and Frame the Debate, self-labeled as "the Essential Guide for Progressives", was published in September 2004 and features a foreword by former Democratic presidential candidate Howard Dean.

== Disagreement with Steven Pinker ==
In 2006 cognitive psychologist Steven Pinker wrote an unfavorable review of Lakoff's book Whose Freedom? in The New Republic. Pinker argued that Lakoff's propositions are unsupported, and his prescriptions are a recipe for electoral failure. He wrote that Lakoff was condescending and deplored Lakoff's "shameless caricaturing of beliefs" and his "faith in the power of euphemism." Pinker portrayed Lakoff's arguments as "cognitive relativism, in which mathematics, science, and philosophy are beauty contests between rival frames rather than attempts to characterize the nature of reality."

Lakoff wrote a rebuttal to Pinker's review, stating that his positions on many issues were the exact reverse of what Pinker attributes to him. Lakoff said that he explicitly rejects cognitive relativism, contending that he is "a realist, both about how the mind works and how the world works. Given that the mind works by frames and metaphors, the challenge is to use such a mind to accurately characterize how the world works."

== Works ==
=== Writings ===
- —— (February 1968). "Instrumental Adverbs and the Concept of Deep Structure". Foundations of Language. 4 (1): 4–29. JSTOR 25000311.
- 1968. Counterparts, or the problem of reference in transformational grammar. Linguistics Club Indiana University.
- 1970. Irregularity in Syntax. Holt, Rinehart, and Winston. ISBN 978-0030841453.
- 1980 with Mark Johnson. Metaphors We Live By. University of Chicago Press. ISBN 978-0-226-46801-3.
- 1987. Women, Fire, and Dangerous Things: What Categories Reveal About the Mind. University of Chicago Press. ISBN 0-226-46804-6.
- 1989 with Mark Turner. More Than Cool Reason: A Field Guide to Poetic Metaphor. University of Chicago Press. ISBN 978-0-226-46812-9.
- 1996. Moral Politics: What Conservatives Know That Liberals Don't. University of Chicago Press. ISBN 978-0-226-46805-1.
- 1999 with Mark Johnson. Philosophy in the Flesh: The Embodied Mind and Its Challenge to Western Thought. Basic Books.
- 2000 with Rafael Núñez. Where Mathematics Comes From: How the Embodied Mind Brings Mathematics into Being. Basic Books. ISBN 0-465-03771-2.
- 2001. Moral Politics: How Liberals and Conservatives Think (2nd ed.). University of Chicago Press. ISBN 978-0-226-46771-9.
- 2003 with Mark Johnson. Metaphors We Live By (2nd ed.). University of Chicago Press. (Contains an "Afterword".) ISBN 978-0-226-46800-6.
- 2004. Don't Think of an Elephant: Know Your Values and Frame the Debate. Chelsea Green Publishing. ISBN 978-1-931498-71-5.
- 2005. "The Brain's Concept: The Role of the Sensory-Motor System in Conceptual Knowledge"-Vittorio Gallese, Università di Parma and George Lakoff University of California, Berkeley
- 2005. "A Cognitive Scientist Looks at Daubert", American Journal of Public Health. 95, no. 1: S114.
- 2006. Thinking Points: Communicating Our American Values and Vision. Farrar, Straus and Giroux. ISBN 978-0-374-53090-7.
- 2006. Whose Freedom?: The Battle over America's Most Important Idea. Farrar, Straus and Giroux. ISBN 978-0-374-15828-6.
- 2008. The Political Mind: Why You Can't Understand 21st-Century American Politics with an 18th-Century Brain. Viking Adult. ISBN 978-0-670-01927-4.
- 2010. "Why it Matters How We Frame the Environment" (PDF). Environmental Communication. 4 (1): 70–81. March 2010. Bibcode:2010Ecomm...4...70L. doi:10.1080/17524030903529749. S2CID 7254556. Archived (PDF) from the original on September 26, 2021.
- 2012 with Elisabeth Wehling. The Little Blue Book: The Essential Guide to Thinking and Talking Democratic. Free Press. ISBN 978-1-476-70001-4.
- 2016. Moral Politics: How Liberals and Conservatives Think (3rd ed.). University of Chicago Press. ISBN 978-0-226-41129-3.
- 2025 The Neural Mind: How Brains Think (George Lakoff and Srini Narayanan)

=== Videos ===
- How Democrats and Progressives Can Win: Solutions from George Lakoff DVD format. OCLC 315514475

== See also ==
- Code word (figure of speech)
- Cognitive linguistics
- Cognitive science of mathematics
- Conceptual metaphor
- Embodied philosophy
- Framing (social sciences)
- Invariance principle
- Language and thought
- Metaphor
- Metonymy
- Prototype theory
