= Luc Steels =

Belgian computer scientist and artist (born 1952)

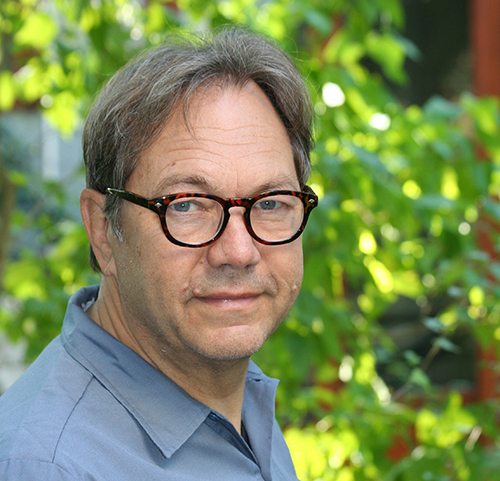
- Steels at the Berlin Institute for Advanced Study in 2016
- Born: January 22, 1952 (age 74); Belsele, Sint-Niklaas, Belgium
- Education: University of Antwerp; MIT
- Scientific career
- Workplaces: Schlumberger; Sony; Vrije Universiteit Brussel; Pompeu Fabra University
- Thesis: Aspects of a modular theory of language (1977)
- Doctoral advisor: Hugo Brandt Corstius
- Other academic advisors: Marvin Minsky
- Doctoral students: Pattie Maes; Pierre-Yves Oudeyer

Luc Leo Steels (born 22 January 1952) is a Belgian scientist and artist. Steels works with artificial intelligence in Europe who has made contributions to expert systems, behavior-based robotics, artificial life and evolutionary computational linguistics. He was a fellow of the Catalan Institution for Research and Advanced Studies (ICREA) associated as a research professor with the Institute of Evolutionary Biology (UPF/CSIC) in Barcelona. He was formerly founding Director of the Artificial Intelligence Laboratory of the Vrije Universiteit Brussel and founding director of the Sony Computer Science Laboratory in Paris. Steels has collaborated with visual artists and theater makers and composed music for opera.

== Biography ==
Steels was born in the town of Belsele near Antwerp, Belgium. He studied German philology at the University of Antwerp, where he obtained a M.A. in 1974 and a Ph.D. in linguistics in 1977 under the supervision of Hugo Brandt Corstius. His thesis was in computational linguistics on a parallel model of parsing. Steels pursued another master's degree in Computer Science at MIT, specializing in AI under the supervision of Marvin Minsky and Carl Hewitt. He graduated in 1979. In 1980, Steels joined the Schlumberger-Doll Research Laboratory in Ridgefield, Connecticut to work on knowledge-based approaches to the interpretation of oil well logging data and became leader of the group who developed the Dipmeter Advisor which he transferred into industrial use while at Schlumberger Engineering, Clamart. In 1983, he was appointed as a tenured professor in Computer Science with a chair in AI at the Free University of Brussels (VUB). The same year he founded the VUB Artificial Intelligence Laboratory and became the first chairman of the VUB Computer Science Department from 1990 to 1995. The VUB AI Lab focused initially on knowledge-based systems for various industrial applications but gradually focused more on basic research in AI.

In 1996, Steels founded the Sony Computer Science Laboratory (CSL) in Paris and became its acting director. This laboratory was a spin-off from the Sony Computer Science Laboratory in Tokyo directed by Mario Tokoro and Toshi Doi. The laboratory targeted research in AI, particularly on the emergence and evolution of grounded language and ontologies on robots, the use of AI in music, and contributions to sustainability. The CSL music group was directed by Francois Pachet and the sustainability group by Peter Hanappe.

In 2011, Steels became fellow at the Institute for Research and Advanced Studies (ICREA) and research professor at the Universitat Pompeu Fabra (UPF) in Barcelona, embedded in the Evolutionary Biology Laboratory (IBE). There he pursued further his fundamental research in the origins and evolution of language through experiments with robotic agents.

From 2018 he started to work in Venice within various European projects, first at Ca'Foscari University within the Odycceus and AI4EU projects and then at Venice International University within the MUHAI project.

Throughout his career, Steels had research and educational visits to other institutions. He was a lecturer at the Theseus International Management Institute in Sophia Antipolis, developed courses for the Open University in the Netherlands, was Fellow at the Wissenschaftskolleg in Berlin during the years 2015–2016 and 2009–2010, Fellow at Goldsmiths College London (computer science department) from 2010, visiting scholar or lecturer at La Sapienza University Rome, Politecnico di Milano, the universities of Ghana and Beijing (Jiaotong University) among others.

Steels was member of the New York Academy of Sciences, and is elected member of the Academia Europaea, and the Royal Belgian Academy of Arts and Sciences (Koninklijke Vlaamse Academie voor Wetenschappen en Kunsten), where he serves as chairman of the Natural Science section.

Steels received several awards including the best paper award at the European Conference in AI (in 1982), the Franqui chair at the University of Leuven (Belgium) (2018), the EurAI Fellowship, the Calewaert chair at the Free University of Brussels (VUB) (2024) and the EurAI Distinguished Service Award, presented every two years to an individual who has made exceptional contributions to the AI community in Europe.

== Contributions ==
The scientific work of Steels is trans-disciplinary, focusing on finding conceptual breakthroughs in AI, building the technical tools to work out and develop these breakthroughs, and developing concrete experiments to turn the breakthroughs into viable new AI paradigms. Since the early 1980s and using this approach, Steels has played a role in four profound conceptual shifts: (1) from heuristic rule-based systems to model-based knowledge systems, from model-based to behaviour-based, artificial Life inspired robots, from static, engineered language systems to dynamic, evolving emergent communication systems with features of human languages, and most recently from data-driven AI to AI capable of understanding and forms of awareness.

=== The knowledge-level in expert systems ===
The early 1980s saw a period of interest in the use of the rule-based paradigm for building expert systems. Expert systems are intended to assist human experts in tackling challenging problems, such as medical diagnosis (e.g. MYCIN) or the configuration of complex technical equipment (e.g. R1) . By the mid-1980s these techniques became used in industry and integrated in software engineering practice, but the exclusive focus on heuristic rules was limiting, primarily because of the efforts involved in finding an adequate set of rules and because of brittleness seen when there were cases that fell outside the scope of the rules.

From 1985 a trend among AI researchers, including Balakrishnan Chandrasekaran, William Clancey, Doug Lenat, John McDermott, Tom Mitchell, Bob Wielinga, a.o., arose to capture human expertise in more depth. Triggered by Allen Newell's paper on the need to adopt a `knowledge-level' analysis and design strategy, the new generation of knowledge systems used models of the problem domain based on an explicitly represented ontology and employing problem solving strategies to compose tasks into subtasks and solving them. Heuristic rules were still relevant but they would now be learned by first solving a problem using models and inference strategies and by then storing the solution, after some degree of abstraction. The key advantages of this knowledge level approach are more robustness, because the system can fall back on deeper reasoning when heuristic rules are missing, a richer explanation facility because of the use of deeper models, and a more methodical design process including techniques for verification and validation.

Steels played a role in establishing this new paradigm in the 1980s, organising a number of workshops and tutorials, helping to develop knowledge level design methodologies, particularly in collaboration with Bob Wielinga and the CommonKADS approach developed at the University of Amsterdam, and publishing papers outlining the knowledge level approach.

With his team at the AI Lab of the Vrije Universiteit Brussel, he developed various tools, such as the knowledge representation system KRS, which was a frame-based object-oriented extension of LISP with facilities for truth maintenance, meta-level inference and computational reflection. The team applied the approach for building challenging operational expert systems in various technical domains (electronic circuit design for digital telephone, scheduling of Belgian railway traffic, monitoring of subway and diagnosis of nuclear power stations). These systems became used in real operation and ran on the innovative Symbolics LISP machines. It all lead to the creation of a spin-off company Knowledge Technologies (with Kris Van Marcke as CEO) to further channel these developments into practical industrial use. The company was active from 1986–1995.

=== Artificial Life and Behavior-based Robotics ===
Around 1986, Steels opened in his VUB laboratory a second research line to develop a new paradigm for AI inspired by living systems. Because this paradigm rose as a part of the movement towards Artificial Life, it became known as the Artificial Life approach to AI or also, because of the focus on behavior, as the behavior-based approach to AI and robotics, as well as the animat approach. The behavior-based paradigm was intended to be complementary to the knowledge-based paradigm, which targets deliberative intelligence, in that it tackles reactive intelligence for real time adaptive behavior of autonomous robotic agents embodied in real world environments. This new research line was at the confluence of several emerging trends happening in the late nineteen-eighties and nineteen-nineties: A revival of cybernetic reactive robots spearheaded by Rodney Brooks, the establishment of Artificial Life shaped as a new discipline by Chris Langton, a renewed focus on emergent computation through self-organisation using cellular automata, models from chaos theory, and genetic algorithms, and the rise of multi-layered neural networks initiated by David Rumelhart and James McClelland.

Steels was active in establishing the new paradigm by organising a series of workshops, conferences and summer and spring schools and by writing some influential papers to define the new paradigm. With his team in Brussels, he worked out hardware platforms (using self-designed processing boards, Lego and simple electronics parts, with Tim Smithers taking the lead) and software platforms including PDL (Process Description Language). He also set up various robotic experiments, the most important one being the self-sufficiency experiment, initiated with ethologist David McFarland.

The self-sufficiency experiment was based on Walter Grey's electric tortoise experiment from the 1950s. This experiment featured simple automatons (animats) capable of wall following, phototaxis and finding and using a charging station. The McFarland-Steels experiment added the challenge of having multiple robots and competition for the energy in the charging station so that the robots had to do work. The experimental setup functioned for 10 years as a framework for experiments in adaptive behavior, genetic algorithms and reinforcement learning by students at the VUB AI Lab with Andreas Birk leading them.

=== Fluid Construction Grammar ===
In 1995, after a visit to the Sony Computer Science Laboratory in Tokyo at the invitation of Mario Tokoro, Steels opened a new chapter in his research efforts, bringing the evolutionary thinking from Artificial Life and the advances in behavior-based robotics to bear on the question how it could be possible for a population of agents to self-organise an evolving adaptive language to communicate about the world as perceived through their sensory-motor apparatus. A new team of collaborators was set up at the VUB AI lab and at the Sony Computer Science Laboratory in Paris and worked from 1995—2015 on this topic.

The first breakthroughs were reached around 1996 in the domain of phonetics and phonology. Steels proposed a self-organisation approach to the origins of speech sounds and phonetic structures. Experiments were set up in which a population of agents, equipped with a basic vocal apparatus and auditory system, developed a shared inventory of speech sounds by playing imitation games, introducing variations generating sounds and adapting to the sounds of others. These experiments were worked out in the ph.D dissertations of Bart de Boer, and Pierre-Yves Oudeyer.

In parallel, Steels proposed in 1995 the Naming Game to study the origins of linguistic conventions in general and the formation of lexicons. The Naming Game is a language game played by a population of agents. In each interaction the speaker chooses a topic and uses one or more words to draw attention of the listener to the topic. The game is a success if the reader pays attention to the topic chosen by the listener and both agents reinforce their existing inventory. Otherwise, speakers may invent new words, listeners adopt new words, and both change the associative scores between words and meanings in their respective inventories. In a concrete experiment, agents start without an initial vocabulary and gradually invent new words and coordinate their usage of words in local interactions. Nevertheless, a coherent vocabulary gradually emerges and gets maintained when the population changes or new topics come up.

In 1996, Steels introduced the Discrimination Game as a way to study the origins of meanings and later on (in 2014) the Syntax Game for studying the emergence of syntax. The Language Game paradigm has been productive to study a wide range of issues in the emergence and evolution of language, first in theoretical work, with mathematical proofs that populations can indeed reach coherence (achieved in 2005 by Bart de Vylder and Karl Tuyls) and with the discovery of scaling laws in relation to the growth of populations and possible topics (achieved in 2007 by Andrea Baronchelli and Vittorio Loreto).

The complexity of the languages grew to include morphology and syntax and more and more conceptual domains were tackled. Thus Steels has done in-depth research on color languages (with Tony Belpaeme and Joris Bleys), case systems (with Remi van Trijp and Pieter Wellens), spatial language (with Martin Loetzsch and Michael Spranger), agreement systems (with Katrien Beuls ), determiners (with Simon Pauw) and action languages (with Martin Loetzsch, Michael Spranger and Sebastian Höfer. Many of these achievements worked in robotic experiments, first on simple lego-vehicles, then with vision-based agents in the 'Talking Heads Experiment' and later on with the 4-legged Sony AIBO robot and the Sony humanoid robot QRIO.

Steels pushed the language game paradigm by the organisation of summer schools (Erice 2004 & 2006, Cortona 2009 & 2013 and Como 2016), the founding of the Evolution of communication journal, the publication of key papers and collections of research works on language evolution. Steels also pushed forward the development and spreading of tools, in particular a software platform for doing experiments in language emergence called BABEL and a formalism for representing emergent grammars called Fluid Construction Grammar (FCG). Starting from 2000, Fluid Construction Grammar has gone through many design iterations to become the main operational paradigm for implementing computational construction grammar.

=== Understanding ===
From around 2018 at the peak of advancements and applications in data-driven neural network style AI, Steels began to participate in efforts to create a human-centric form of AI. Together with Ramon Lopez de Mantaras he launched the Barcelona declaration for the proper development and usage of artificial intelligence in Europe in 2018. that influenced the European Ethical Guidelines for Trustworthy AI published in 2019. He also initiated the ethical AI workpackage in the large-scale AI4EU coordination project of the EU commission.

Steels argued that more than regulations is needed to make AI more human-centered and launched a number of projects to combine reactive intelligence (captured through neural network style systems) with the deliberative intelligence that was the focal point of earlier AI research. Concretely, the EU project MUHAI focuses on how the level of understanding in AI systems could be increased by building rich models of problem domains and problem situations and integrating a variety of knowledge sources (ontologies, language, vision and action, mental simulation, episodic memory and context models), and the EU project VALAWAI focuses on how AI systems can be made 'value-aware' by introducing attention mechanisms to deal with highly complex, uncertain fragmented inputs, and a component implementing 'moral intelligence'.

== Contributions to the arts ==
The artistic work of Luc Steels has been trans-disciplinary as well, with interests, realisations and writings about the arts, music and theatre.

=== Avant-garde performance ===
In the early 1970s Luc Steels became active in Performance art, and in avant-garde electro-acoustic music. In 1972 he founded the collective 'Dr. Buttock's players pool', participated in the Welfare State theatre in 1977 and with performance artist Hugo Roelandt. In music, he was part of the 1970s Antwerp Free Music scene, playing guitar in a style created by Derek Bailey. In 1971 he co-founded the ensemble Mishalle-Geladi-Steels (MGS) with saxophonist Luc Mishalle and electronic musician Paul Mishalle. The ensemble performed with the Studio for New Music set up by Joris De Laet, particularly at the ICC in Antwerp. Lifelong interactions originated from this period with artist Anne-Mie Van Kerckhoven, who Steels had invited as artist in residence at the University of Antwerp and later at the VUB AI laboratory in Brussels, and Peter Beyls, who was also artist in residence at the VUB AI Lab.

=== Art installations and cooperations ===
After a period of total focus on scientific work while in the United States, Luc Steels returned to artistic activities from the 1980s onwards. Thanks to an encounter with H-U Obrist at the Burda Akademie symposium in Munich in 1995, he came into contact with artists, resulting in public presentations in art contexts such as at the Bridge the Gap encounters (2001 Kitakyushu), the Memory Marathon (Serpentine Gallery, London, 2007 & 2012), and the Experiment Marathon (Reykjavik 2008). Within this artistic network Steels collaborated with several artists for the co-creation of new works, including with Carsten Holler (for the CapC Musee in Bordeaux and the Koelnerische Kunstverein); with Olafur Eliasson for a piece 'Look into the box' for the Musee d'art moderne in Paris in 2002 and later shown at the Festival dei 2 Mondi (Spoleto, 2003), the ExploraScience Museum (Tokyo, 2006), ), and other locations; with Sissel Tolaas for work shown at the Berlin Biennale; with Anne-Mie van Kerckhoven at the NeuerAachenerKunstverein; and with Armin Linke and Giuliana Bruno for the New Alphabeth (Stop Making Sense) exhibition at the Haus der Kulturen der Welt (Berlin); Steels participated with his own installations in various art-science exhibitions, the most important ones being Laboratorium curated by H-U Obrist and B. Vanderlinden in Antwerp in 1999, and N01SE in Cambridge (Kettle's Yard) and London (Wellcome Gallery) in 2000, curated by Adam Lowe and Simon Schaffer.

=== Theatre ===
The interest of Luc Steels in performance and theatre was rekindled in 2004 by a collaboration with theatre director Jean-Francois Peyret on a commissioned play about the Russian mathematician Sofya Kovalevskaya for the Avignon Theatre Festival 2005 and performed in 2006 at the French National Theatre (Chaillot) in Paris. From 2010, music and theatre came together in two opera projects with neuroscientist Oscar Vilarroya as libretist and Luc Steels as composer. The first opera entitled Casparo premiered at the Palau de la Musica in Barcelona in 2011 and was later performed in Brussels (Theatre Moliere) 2013, Tokyo (Sony Concert Hall) in 2013, Leuven BE (Iers College) in 2014 and Paris (Jussieu Theatre) in 2014. The second opera, entitled Fausto had avant-premiere performances in La Gaite Lyrique (Paris) in 2016 and the Monnaie Opera House (Brussels in 2017) with full performances at the And&MindGate Festival (Leuven BE, 2018) and at the Homo Roboticus event at the Brussels Monnaie Opera House in 2019. Most of these performances were conducted by Kris Stroobants with the Frascati Symphonic Orchestra, the choir La Folia, and various solists, including Reinoud van Mechelen and Pablo Lopez Martin (Mallorca opera). The operas are written in a neo-classical, post modern musical style and elaborate societal and trans-humanistic issues raised by the use of Artificial Intelligence, including the occurrence of a singularity and the possibility of immortality through virtual agents.

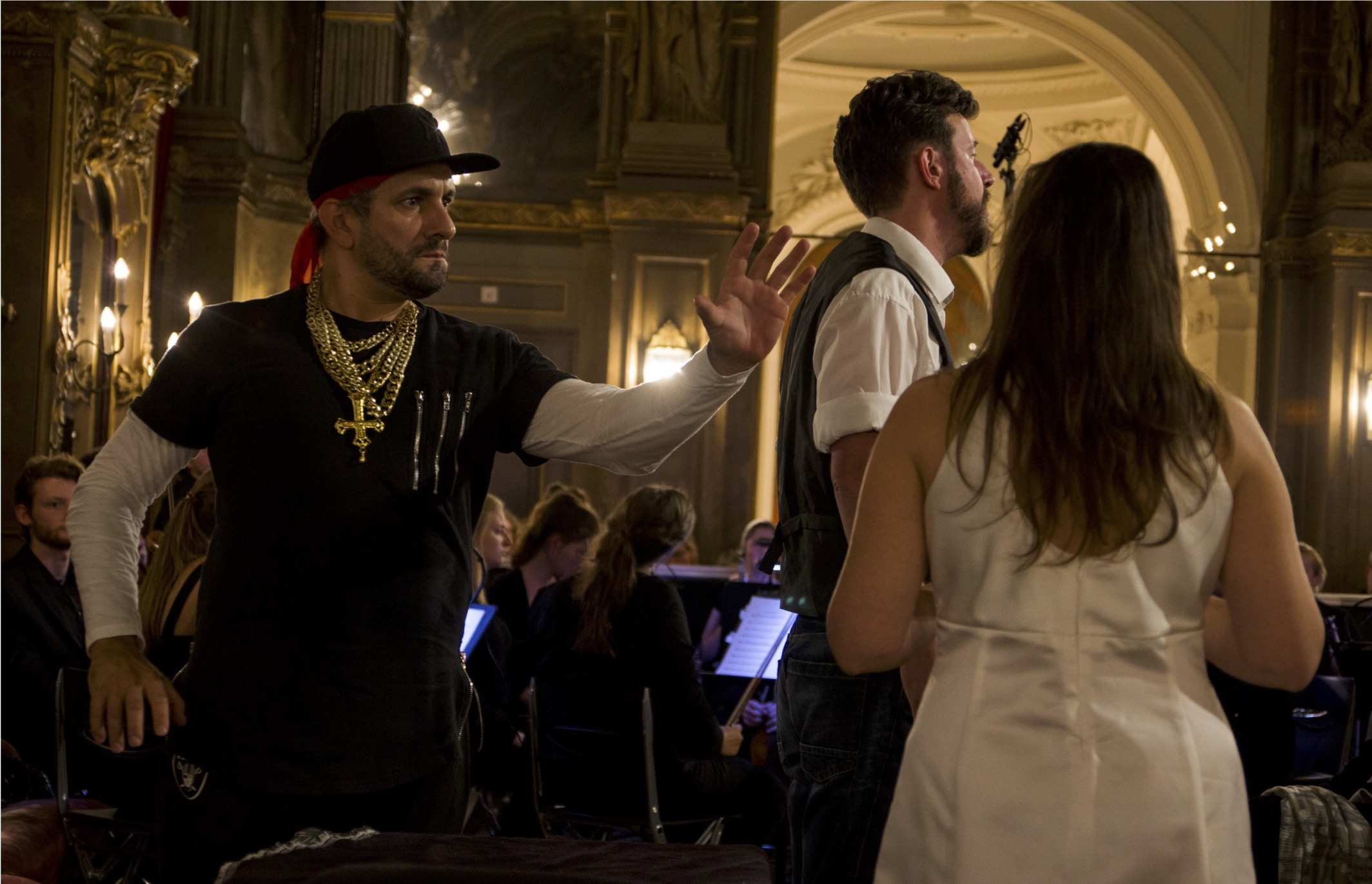
Performance of Opera Fausto, Muntschouwburg Brussels 2017

=== Essays and art curation ===
Luc Steels curated a number of international exhibitions, including Intensive Science at La Maison Rouge in Paris (in 2006 and 2008), artes@ijcai at the Centro Borges in Buenos Aires (Argentina) in 2015 and the 'Aqua Granda. Una Memoria Digitale' exhibition at the Science Gallery Venice in 2021.

He contributed with essays on art and music for journals such as KunstForum and Janus Magazine (Issue 20), and for exhibition catalogs, He also wrote academic papers on computer music and art interpretation.

In 2020, Steels was S+T+ARTS 'scientist in residence' at the Luc Tuymans art studio, 'Studio Tuymans' in Antwerp, which resulted in an exhibition at the BOZAR museum in Brussels based on the use of AI methods to interpret a single art work by painter Luc Tuymans called 'Secrets'.

In 2023, Luc Steels curated an exhibition 'Science on the Edge of Chaos' at the Royal Library in Brussels, focused on research during the 1980s and 1990s about chaos theory and its application in different sciences.

== Selected publications ==
- Steels, Luc (1990) "Components of Expertise" AI Magazine 11(2) pp. 28–49.
- Steels, Luc (2001) Grounding Symbols through Evolutionary Language Games. In: Cangelosi A. and Parisi D. (Eds.) Simulating the Evolution of Language Springer.
- Steels, Luc (2011) "Design Patterns in Fluid Construction Grammar" John Benjamins Pub.

Amsterdam.

- Steels, Luc (2011). "Modeling the cultural evolution of language". Physics of Life Reviews. 8 (4): 339–356. Bibcode:2011PhLRv...8..339S. doi:10.1016/j.plrev.2011.10.014. PMID 22071322.

== Notes and references ==
- Bergen, B. (2008). "A whole-systems approach to language. An interview with Luc Steels". Annual Review of Cognitive Linguistics. 6: 329–344. doi:10.1075/arcl.6.18ste.
- Manuel TL (2003). "Creating a Robot Culture: An Interview with Luc Steels" (PDF). IEEE Intelligent Systems. 18 (3 May/June 2003): 59–61. doi:10.1109/MIS.2003.1200730.

== See also ==
- Behavior based robotics
- Evolutionary linguistics
- Fluid construction grammar
