= Adviser =

Person with more and deeper knowledge in a specific area

An adviser or advisor is normally a person with more and deeper knowledge in a specific area and usually also includes persons with cross-functional and multidisciplinary expertise. An adviser's role is that of a mentor or guide and differs categorically from that of a task-specific consultant. An adviser is typically part of the leadership, whereas consultants fulfill functional roles.

The spellings adviser and advisor have both been in use since the 16th century. Adviser has always been the more usual spelling, though advisor has gained frequency in recent years and is a common alternative, especially in North America.

== Etymology ==
The use of adviser is of English origin, with "er" as a noun ending, and advisor of Latin origin. The words are etymological twin cognates and are considered interchangeable.

== Word usage ==
Usage of the two words is normally a matter of choice, but it is usually recommended to use one consistently within a document. The Associated Press prefers (AP Stylebook) the use of "adviser", but Virginia Tech (style guide) gives preference to "advisor", stating that it "is used more commonly in academe" and that "adviser is acceptable in releases going to organizations that follow AP style". Purdue University Office of Marketing and Media's Editorial Style Guide gives preference to "advisor". The European Commission uses "adviser(s)", the UK has Special advisers, as well as the Scottish Government, and the United Nations uses Special Advisers. The US government uses both: Council of Economic Advisers, Office of the Legal Adviser, Deputy National Security Advisor (deputy to the President's NSA), Legal "Advisor" (Office for the Administrative Review of the Detention of Enemy Combatants), that was part of the team tasked to conduct Combatant Status Review Tribunals of captives detained in Guantanamo Bay, and laws Investment Advisers Act of 1940. The Bureau of Educational and Cultural Affairs's Fulbright Program has "advisers".

== Specific uses ==
=== Books ===
Use of "advisor" appeared in print in the United States in 1889, with The Tennessee Justice and Legal Advisor by William C. Kain and Horace N. Hawkins. The Department of Justice of the United States, Issue 15, printed in 1927 by the Institute For Government Research, uses both spellings: "1. Political adviser and assistant to the President" and "Legal Advisor. Like all the other cabinet officers, the Attorney General is a political advisor of the President".

=== Consultancy ===
- Business advisor, an expert or a professional in a specific field or a specific subject in business.
- Tax advisor, an individual or firm expert in tax law.
- Africa Business Club Consultancy, focused on Africa–UAE partnerships and cross-border investment projects.

=== Finances ===
- Commercial finance advisor, a professional banker expert in business financing and corporate banking relationships.
- Financial advisor, also known as a financial planner, a practicing professional who helps people to deal with various personal financial issues through proper planning.
  - In the UK, this person is known as a financial adviser.
  - Fee-Only financial advisor, a financial advisor compensated only by clients and accepting no commissions or compensation from other sources.
- Financial Management Advisor, a professional designation of the Canadian Securities Institute.
- Investment Advisor, an individual or firm that advises clients on investment matters.
- Registered Investment Adviser, an individual or firm who has registered with the U.S. Securities and Exchange Commission or with a state regulatory agency in connection with the management of the investments of others.

=== Publications ===
- Broadband & Internet Advisor (originally Internet Advisor), a magazine which provides articles, news, and reviews relating to Internet technology.
- The CPA Technology Advisor, a technology magazine for accounting and tax professionals.
- Resident Advisor, an online electronic-music magazine dedicated to the global dance-music scene.

=== Specific advisory companies ===
- Amaranth Advisors LLC, an American multistrategy hedge fund.
- Dimensional Fund Advisors, an investment firm that develops mutual funds grounded in academic research.
- State Street Global Advisors, the investment management division of State Street Corporation.

=== Specific advisory services ===
- Dipmeter Advisor, an early system developed to aid in the analysis of data gathered during oil exploration.
- McAfee SiteAdvisor, an Internet service that warns users that a site may make them victims of malware or spam.
- MIT Design Advisor, an online tool for exploring the energy performance of building designs.

=== Media ===
Examples of the use of adviser and advisor in the media on a particular subject:

- NPR: "Deputy National Security Adviser Explains U.S. Options In ..."
- The Washington Post: "deputy national security adviser for strategic communications"
- The Wall Street Journal: "Obama to Name Deputy National-Security Adviser"
- The White House: "Briefing by Deputy National Security Advisor for Strategic Communications Ben Rhodes"
- English Wikipedia: Ben Rhodes (politician), "the current deputy national security adviser for strategic communication for U.S. President Barack Obama".
- The Foundry: "CBS News President David Rhodes is the brother of Ben Rhodes, the White House deputy national security adviser..."
- Yahoo News: "President Barack Obama's national security adviser..."
- Indiana University Bloomington: "Rhodes is assistant to the president and deputy national security advisor for strategic communications and speechwriting".

=== Other ===
- Academic advisor, an employee of a college or university who helps students to select courses or an academic major and engaging in short-term and long-term educational planning (in some countries, the professor who offers a student academic/methodologic assistance to prepare the work/thesis job necessary to obtain the degree).
- Athletic advisors, some athletic staffs have coaches or Sport management roles deemed advisors. This can vary the type of advisory position. American football, commonly has advisor positions whether it's an advisor to the head coach or Senior Advisor. Notable advisor coaches have been Brian Billick, Tedy Bruschi, Rick Dennison, Larry Harris, Will Healy, Matt Patricia, and Ken Zampese .
- Doctoral advisor, an advanced member of a university faculty with the role of guiding a graduate student.
- Combine Advisor, a fictional creature from the Half-Life series.
- Customer service advisor, a generic job title in the service industry, principally used in the United Kingdom.
- Dangerous Goods Safety Advisor, a qualification required of chemical distributors and storage companies throughout the United Kingdom relating to packing and labeling of hazardous materials.
- Legal advisor, a lawyer who gives legal advice.
- Military advisors, a form of military support.
- Technical advisor, an expert in a particular field of knowledge, hired (for example) to ensure that some area of knowledge is portrayed accurately in a movie.
- Technical design advisor, a person in charge of advising in technical aspects of information-technology design.

== Notable advisers ==
Portrait	Name	Year	Origin	Notes
	Chanakya	375–283 BCE	India	Indian polymath and a royal advisor of Mauryan Emperors Chandragupta and Bindusara who authored the ancient Indian political treatise, the Arthashastra
	Birbal	1528–1586	Madhya Pradesh, India	Advisor and main commander (Mukhya Senapati) of army in the court of the Mughal emperor, Akbar and one of the Akbar's Navratnas
	Bairam Khan	1501–1561	Badakhshan, Central Asia	At the court of the Mughal Emperors, Humayun and Akbar
	Henry Kissinger	1923–2023	Weimar Republic, Germany	American diplomat, who served as United States Secretary of State and National Security Advisor
	Yelu Chucai	1190–1244	Yanjing, Jin dynasty	Khitan adviser to Genghis Khan and his son Ögedei

== See also ==
- Adviser (Bangladesh) – Head of a ministry in interim and caretaker governments of Bangladesh
- Judge–advisor system
- Council
