= Danny Devos =

Belgian performance artist (born 1959)

- Devos: Thriller on 28 March 1979
- Born: 20 September 1959 (age 67); Vilvoorde, Belgium
- Occupations: Performance artist, musician
- Spouse: Anne-Mie Van Kerckhoven
- Writing career
- Pen name: DDV
- Genres: Noise music, Performance art, installation art, sculpture
- Website: www.performan.org

Danny Devos (born 20 September 1959), also known as DDV, is a Belgian artist whose work involves body art and performance art and a fascination with true crime.

Since 1979 he has done 176 performances and made several sculptural installations depicting violence, crime and murder. Since 1987 he has been corresponding with serial killers like Freddy Horion and Michel Bellen in Belgium and John Wayne Gacy in the USA.

In 1981 he founded the artist initiative Club Moral with Anne-Mie van Kerckhoven.

From 1998 until 2004 he was Social Commissioner and chairman of the NICC, the first association of Visual Artists in Belgium, where he was in charge of the Social Statute of the Artist.

In 2005 he moved to Beijing in China to develop and manage Art Farm for colleague artist Wim Delvoye.

From 2005 until recently he performed his piece 'Diggin' for Gordon', inspired by Gordon Matta-Clark, at a secret location and could only be seen by the audience through a webcam.

Since 2021 his works are based on artificial intelligence text-to-image model renderings that are then used to produce 3D printing or CNC machined relief objects. In 2025 he created 650 images from a 1974 exhibition catalogue of works from J. M. W. Turner, using the titles as prompts in a text-to-image model.

Unique in the field of Performance art is his artistic documenting of iconic performances by making them into 3D scale models. Another mode of documenting exists in the recreation of images by AI Machine Learning Models to generate images of performances whereof scarce or no photographic documentation exists.

Club Moral is also a pioneer noise music band.

Apart from solo sound concerts, he also performs with Bum Collar, an improvisational noise band with Anne-Mie Van Kerckhoven on electronics, Mauro Pawlowski on guitar, and Paul Mennes engineering and browntones.

== Solo exhibitions ==
- In Memory of Ed Gein (Ruimte Morguen) 1987
- Belgium's Most Bizarre Artist (Ruimte Morguen) 1989
- De Moorden in Ruimte Morguen (Ruimte Morguen) 1991
- True Crime Art (Galerie Transit) 1991
- The Red Spider of Katowice (Galeria Potocka, Kraków) 1993
- De Wurger / The Strangler (Galerie Annette De Keyser) 1994
- De Vampier van Muizen 1994
- Daders van Dodingen / Perpetrators of Death (Galerie Annette De Keyser) 1996
- Ons Geluk (with Luc Tuymans) 1997
- Speech Regained (Pranakorn Bar & Gallery) 2000
- Thai Boy Slim (Galerie Annette De Keyser) 2000
- A Study for the Happiest Man Alive (Annie Gentils Gallery) 2012
- Picnic at Hanssenspark (De Bond) 2014
- Lily & Rudy (Annie Gentils Gallery) 2016
- La Révolte des Machines ou La Pensée Déchaînée de Frans Masereel 2023

== Group exhibitions (selection) ==
- Untitled (Ruimte Z) 1979
- 1980 (ICC) 1980
- Van Drang tot Dwang (Club Moral) 1983
- De Dood (K4) 1984
- Automobiënnale (Middelheim) 1985
- Antichambres 1986
- Het Onding Kunst (Stalker) 1988
- Wahrheit und Dichtung (Galerie Maerz) 1989
- Prime Time (w139) 1989
- Woord en Beeld ( MuHKA) 1992
- Wunschmaschinen (WUK/Wolkersdorf) 1993
- Transfer (Gent/Recklinghausen/Charleroi) 1994
- De Rode Poort (SMAK) 1996
- Beeldberichten (KMSKA) 1996
- Alter Ego (Silpakorn University) 1999
- The Divine Comedy (Fort Asperen) 1999
- Pauvre Nous (Factor 44) 2004
- Dear ICC (MuHKA) 2004
- Voorbij Goed & Kwaad (Museum Dr. Guislain) 2006
- The Moss Gathering Tumbleweed Experience (NICC) 2007
- All That is Solid Melts into Air (De Maakbare Mens) (Stadsvisioenen) 2009
- The State of Things (National Art Museum of Beijing) 2010
- Hidden – Conflict (CIAP) 2013
- Crime in Art (Museum of Contemporary Art in Kraków) 2014
