= Playlist =

Curated list of video or audio files

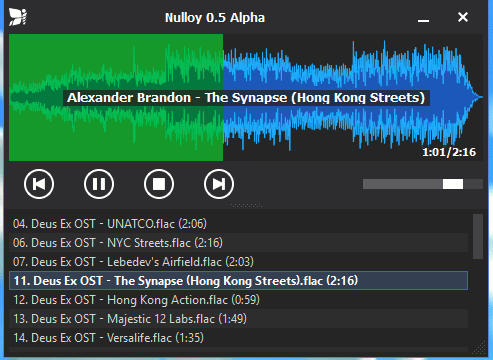
A playlist in an audio player

A playlist is a list of video or audio files that can be played back on a media player, either sequentially or in a shuffled order. In its most general form, an audio playlist is simply a list of songs that can be played once or in a loop. The term has several specialized meanings in the realms of television broadcasting, radio broadcasting and personal computers.

A video playlist can also be a list of recorded titles on a digital video disk (DVD). On the internet, a playlist can be a list of chapters in a movie serial; for example, Flash Gordon in the Planet Mongo is available on YouTube as a playlist of thirteen consecutive video chapters.

== Radio ==
The term originally came about in the early days of Top 40 radio formats in the 1950s when stations would devise (and, eventually, publish) a limited list of songs to be played. The term would go on to refer to the entire catalog of songs that a given radio station (of any format) would draw from. Additionally, the term was used to refer to an ordered list of songs played during a given time period. Playlists are often adjusted based on time of day, known as dayparting.

== Television ==
Cable TV and broadcast TV news channels often use video playlists to rerun prerecorded news stories. A given news story might initially be shown live and then placed into a playlist to be shown over and over again at a later time. News channel broadcasting is a combination of live and pre-recorded programming. The prerecorded clips are usually run from a playlist.

== Computers and the Internet ==
As music storage and playback using personal computers became common, the term "playlist" was adopted by various media player software programs intended to organize and control music on a PC. Such playlists may be defined, stored, and selected to run either in sequence or if a random playlist function is selected, in a random order. Playlists' uses include allowing a particular desired musical atmosphere to be created and maintained without constant user interaction or allowing a variety of different styles of music to be played, again without maintenance.

Several computer playlist formats for multimedia players, such as PLS, can pass a playlist or URL to the player. In the case of radio stations it can also link many audio players directly to the station's live streaming audio, bypassing any need for a web browser. (In that case, the playlist file is typically downloaded from the station's live streaming web page, if offered. The files are similar to Internet shortcut files in appearance and internal structure, except used by media players rather than web browsers.)

Some Internet streaming services, such as Spotify, Amazon Music, Pandora, and the defunct 8tracks, Playlist.com and Webjay, allow users to categorize, edit, and listen to playlists online. Other sites focus on playlist creation aided by personalized song recommendations, ratings, and reviews. On certain sites, users create and share annotated playlists, giving visitors the option to read contextual information or reviewer comments about each song while listening. Some sites only allow the sharing of the playlist data with the actual music being delivered by other channels (e.g., Plurn), others provide a closed catalog of content from which the playlists can be generated, and sites like imeem allow users to upload the music to central servers to be shared and accessed by any user of the site. iPods can also be used to build playlists.

== Celebrity playlists ==
A celebrity playlist is a list of songs prepared by a celebrity and represented in popular publications and on the radio as such.

== Web video ==
On video hosting service websites such as YouTube and Vimeo, users can make playlists of select videos from themselves or other users for topical purposes; paid accounts can upgrade playlists of their own videos to "shows".

== Playlist generation ==
Most media players, such as Winamp, can easily create custom playlists from one's media library. For example, in a software MP3 player for Windows, Android, or macOS, the desired tunes are typically dragged and dropped from the user's music library into the player's "edit or create playlist" window and saved.

The idea of automatically generating music playlists from annotated databases was pioneered by François Pachet and Pierre Roy. Constraint satisfaction techniques were developed to create playlists that satisfy arbitrary "sequence constraints", such as continuity, diversity, similarity, etc. Since, many other techniques were proposed, such as case-based reasoning.

== Other playlist methods ==
- A CD player that holds multiple CDs with a programmable grid mapper.
- MP3 CDs
- Prerecording a mixtape; which is purely sequential.
- Active disc-jockeying where the user manually selects the next song one after another as opposed to a preprogrammed playlist (shuffled or not)
- Stacking records in a sequence on a vinyl record changer
- A jukebox with a programmable record changer

== Types of playlist files ==
Notable file formats used for playlists include:

- .asx, an XML style playlist containing more information about the items on the playlist
- .fpl, is a format used by foobar2000.
- .kpl, Kalliope PlayList, is a kind of XML playlist storing developed to speed up loading and managing playlists.
- .m3u/.m3u8, a simple text-based list of the locations of the items, with each item on a new line. This is one of the most popular playlist types.
- .pla, Samsung format(?), binary, Winamp handles these
- .aimppl, .plc, file extensions for AIMP.
- .mpcpl file extension for Media Player Classic playlist format and its derivatives (MPC-HC, MPC-BE etc)
- .pls, a text playlist similar to .ini (program settings) files. It provides the same functionality as extended M3U playlists by default (title and length).
- .smil is an XML recommendation of the World Wide Web Consortium that includes playlist features. In addition to audio, it supports video and screen layout and is heavily used in Digital Signage.
- .vlc is a format used by VLC Media Player and is defined as a renamed M3U or PLS playlist.
- .wpl, is an XML format used in Microsoft Windows Media Player versions 9–12.
- .xspf, an XML format designed to enable playlist sharing
- .zpl is a format used by Zune Media Player, Zoom Player and Creative Zen Media Players.

== See also ==
- Music scheduling system
- Shuffle play
- Playlist markup language
- Edit decision list
