= Niko Klanšek =

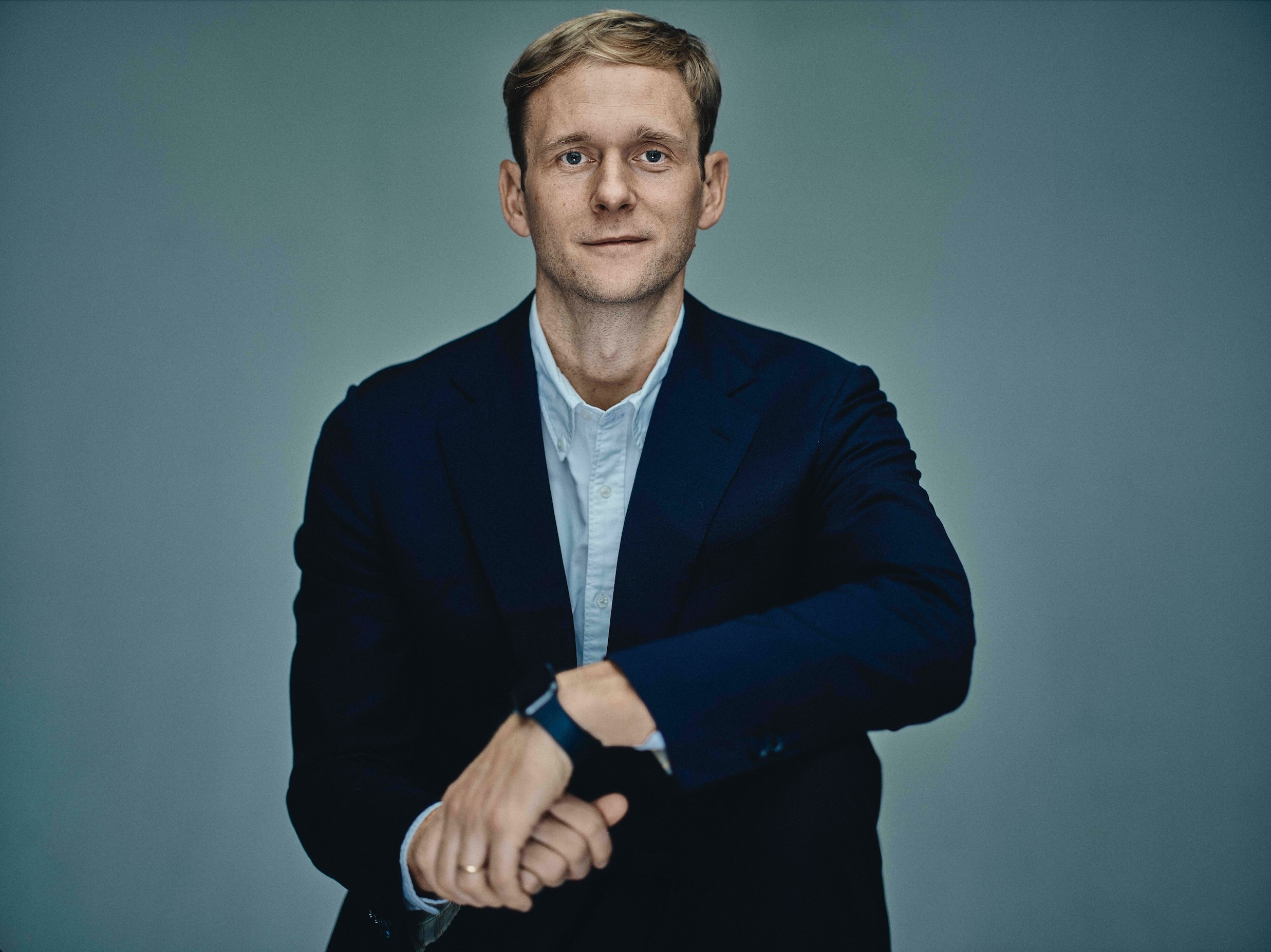
- Born: Niko Klanšek; February 20, 1984 (age 42); Kranj, SFR Yugoslavia
- Education: Harvard Business School
- Alma mater: Fordham University (BS)
- Known for: President of KD Slovan; Entrepreneur, Advisor, Investor
- Spouse: Lina Klanšek

Niko Klanšek (born February 20, 1984) is a Slovenian entrepreneur, advisor and investor. In 2017, he became the president of Slovenian basketball club KD Slovan.
