= Markus Wolff =

American neofolk musician

Markus Wolff is a German born American artist, musician and writer.

An original member of Crash Worship, Pure, and collaborator with A Minority Of One, Blood Axis, L'Acéphale, Allerseelen, and several others, Wolff has produced works of art, sculptures, graphic design and music since the late 80's.

As a writer, he served as an editor Hex Magazine. Wolff has also contributed to the journal Tyr, which describes itself as "radical traditionalist." Among his work is translation of poetry by Nazi SS member Karl Maria Wiligut, dedicated to SS leader Heinrich Himmler.

His creative musical works are collectively known as Waldteufel, a name taken from Emile Waldteufel. Despite being American, he sings almost exclusively in German, and has stated that the German language is "endangered by foreign influences."

== Discography ==
=== Albums and EPs ===
Year	Title	Format, Special Notes
1995	Der Grosse Rausch	7"
1999	Berghoch Am Walde	7"
2000	Heimliches Deutschland	First full-length CD.
2003	Eines Gottes Spur	10"
2004	Heimliches Deutschland	2xLP rerelease. Limited to 400 copies. Special edition limited to 15 copies.
2005	Rauhnacht	Limited to 500 copies. Packaged in a small DVD case.
2006	Berghoch am Walde	7", limited to 50 hand-painted copies.
2008	Sanguis	Third full-length release.
