= Cheffins =

Cheffins is a surname. Notable people with the surname include:

- Charles Cheffins (1807–1860), British mechanical draughtsman and consulting engineer
- Craig Cheffins, former member of the Legislative Assembly of Alberta for the Calgary Elbow riding
- Georgina Fanny Cheffins (1863–1932), English militant suffragette
- Simon Cheffins, British/American percussionist
