= Dan Rahmel =

American author (born 1969)

Dan Rahmel (born 1969) is an American author best known for his work relating to Visual Basic and database servers. Rahmel first began work as a writer for various magazines including DBMS, American Programmer, and Internet Advisor. He co-authored his first book Interfacing to the PowerPC Microprocessor in 1995 and began writing steadily about the programming and database development fields.

In 2002, he began working in Hollywood film production and gained experience as a gaffer, property master, production designer, and lighting technician. He has written a number of articles about his Hollywood experience and in 2004 publisher Focal Press released his book Nuts and Bolts Filmmaking that describes guerrilla filmmaking techniques.

His books have been translated into various languages including Chinese, Japanese, Spanish, French, and Portuguese. In 2006, Focal Press issued a special edition of Nuts and Bolts Filmmaking for release in India.

== Bibliography ==
- Advanced Joomla! (APress)
- Beginning Joomla!: From Novice to Professional, 2nd Edition (APress)
- Professional Joomla! (Wrox)
- Beginning Joomla!: From Novice to Professional (APress)
- Nuts and Bolts Filmmaking (Focal Press)
- Visual Basic .NET Reference Book, 3rd Edition (Osborne)
- Building Web Database Applications with Visual Studio (Osborne)
- Visual Basic/VBA/VB Script Reference Book, 2nd Edition (Osborne)
- Teach Yourself Visual Basic Database Design in 24 hours (SAMS)
- Three-D Business Data Analysis with VRML (Prentice Hall)
- Server-side solutions with Visual JavaScript (McGraw-Hill)
- Visual Basic/VBA/VB Script Reference Book (Osborne)
- Active Platform Sourcebook (John Wiley & Sons)
- Visual Basic for Applications 5, “Techniques from the Experts” chapters (QUE)
- Teach Yourself Visual Basic 5 (MIS Press)
- Using Microsoft Outlook, chapter 28 and chapter 29 (QUE)
- Developing Client/Server Applications with Visual Basic 4.0 (SAMS)
- Interfacing to the PowerPC Microprocessor (SAMS)
