= Michael J. Moynihan =

American musician and journalist

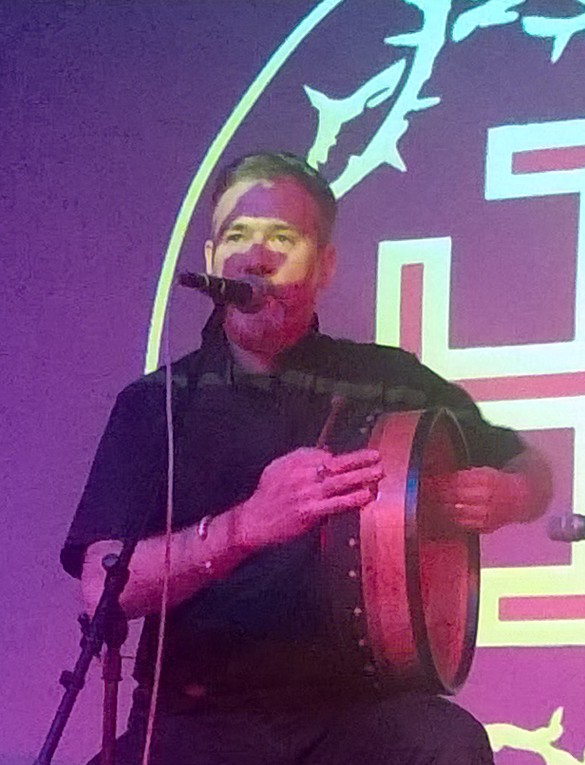
- Performing with Blood Axis in 2016
- Born: Michael Jenkins Moynihan; Boston, Massachusetts, U.S.
- Other name: Michael M. Jenkins
- Education: Portland State University (B.A.); University of Massachusetts Amherst (Ph.D.)
- Occupations: Writer, publisher, journalist, musician
- Years active: 1984-present
- Known for: Blood Axis, Siege, Tyr Journal
- Notable work: Lords of Chaos

Michael Jenkins Moynihan (born 1969) is an American writer, editor, translator, journalist, artist, and musician. He is best known for co-writing Lords of Chaos, a book about black metal. Moynihan is founder of the music group Blood Axis, the music label Storm Records and publishing company Dominion Press.

Moynihan has interviewed numerous musical figures and has published several books, translations, and essays. He also published and edited James Mason's neo-Nazi book Siege, writing the book's introduction and helping Mason promote his work. Often linked to the far-right, Moynihan's politics have shifted through the decades, but remained controversial throughout his career.

== Biography ==
Moynihan was born in Boston, Massachusetts, in 1969, the only son of upper-middle-class parents. He became active in underground tape-trading and fanzine culture as a teenager. He began making experimental music from 1984 with the multi-media project Coup de Grâce, forming Blood Axis in 1989 and releasing his first album under that name in 1995.

Moynihan collaborated with noise musician Boyd Rice from 1989, and in 1990 the two moved into an apartment in Denver.

During the summer of 1991, Moynihan was visited at his apartment by agents of the United States Secret Service about an alleged plot to assassinate then-President of the United States George H. W. Bush. Moynihan agreed to a polygraph test, and no charges were filed. Moynihan stated that it was a simple case of intimidation stemming from his correspondence with Charles Manson, whom he was interviewing for a national magazine.

He was one of the four members of the "occult-fascist" Abraxas Foundation, which he joined in March 1989.

In 1995, Moynihan released the first full-length album by Blood Axis, The Gospel of Inhumanity, and moved from Denver to Portland, Oregon, where he became an editor at Feral House, a publishing company owned by Adam Parfrey. After studying language and history at the University of Colorado and Portland State University, Moynihan received his B.A. in German language in 2000. He received his Ph.D. in 2017 from the University of Massachusetts Amherst.

== Books and articles ==
Moynihan's first publication was an art fanzine called The Final Incision, which he published under the name Coup de Grâce in 1984. It featured contributions from various artists associated with the underground industrial music scene, including "MB" (Maurizio Bianchi) and Trevor Brown. Coup de Grâce also issued various art posters and newsletters between 1985 and 1989. As a graphic artist, Moynihan designed posters for live performances by Coup de Grâce, Sleep Chamber, and Hunting Lodge in the mid-1980s.

Between 1990 and 1995, Moynihan contributed articles, photography, and editorial work to various magazines and journals including the "extreme culture" magazine The Fifth Path (of which he became associate editor), an underground music and culture magazine edited by Robert Ward; the Colorado Music Magazine, a Denver-based music monthly; and the internationally distributed newsstand music and art interview magazine Seconds, edited by Steven Blush and George Petros. During this time, Moynihan also published journalistic work in High Society.

Among the artists and figures Moynihan has interviewed are power electronics founder Whitehouse; Unleashed; Bathory; In the Nursery; Church of Satan founder Anton LaVey; convicted murderer Charles Manson; Peter Steele of Type O Negative; Burzum; George Eric Hawthorne of RAHOWA; Misfits founder Glenn Danzig; Throbbing Gristle and Psychic TV founder Genesis P-Orridge; and Swans founder Michael Gira.

Moynihan started a publishing house called Storm Books. Together with Stephen Flowers, Moynihan co-authored The Secret King (2001, rev. ed. 2007). In 2001, Moynihan edited a reprint of Julius Evola and the UR Group's book Introduction to Magic, originally published in 1929, and in 2002, he edited the first English language translation of Evola's 1953 book Men Among the Ruins (both published by Inner Traditions). In 2004, Moynihan edited with Annabel Lee the first English publication of a treatise by erotic and surrealist artist Hans Bellmer titled Little Anatomy of the Physical Unconscious, or The Anatomy of the Image. The book, which was issued in a limited edition of 1,100 numbered copies, is translated by Jon Graham and includes a preface by the artist Joe Coleman. In 2005, Moynihan edited and published a collection of essays by British writer John Michell (selected from Michell's contributions to The Oldie) entitled Confessions of a Radical Traditionalist.

Moynihan was the co-editor of the journal TYR: Myth – Culture – Tradition.

=== Lords of Chaos ===
Moynihan co-authored with Norwegian journalist Didrik Søderlind the book Lords of Chaos: The Bloody Rise of the Satanic Metal Underground (Feral House, 1998), an account of the early Norwegian black metal scene. It won a 1998 Firecracker Alternative Book Award. In 2018 a full-length dramatic film based on the book and bearing the same title, Lords of Chaos, directed by Jonas Åkerlund and starring Rory Culkin, Emory Cohen, and Sky Ferreira, was released.

Reviews of Lords of Chaos were mixed. The publication was sometimes criticized for a perceived lack of distance towards its subject matter. This was considered especially alarming to groups and figures that had accused Moynihan of right-wing sympathies, charges which Moynihan has dismissed as inapplicable due to the "intricacies of such subjects". However, several critics praised the book for offering an informative or at least interesting view on a relatively obscure subculture.

=== Tyr ===
Tyr: Myth—Culture—Tradition is a journal edited by Moynihan together with Joshua Buckley. The publication is named after Tyr, the Germanic god. The editors state that it "celebrates the traditional myths, culture, and social institutions of pre-Christian, pre-modern Europe." The first issue was published in 2002 under the ULTRA imprint in Atlanta, Georgia.

=== Siege by James Mason ===
In 1992, Moynihan, under his imprint Storm Books, published and edited the influential book Siege, an anthology of the writings produced by the neo-Nazi James Mason for the newsletter of the same name. Storm Books as an imprint was created in October 1989, solely to publish Siege; their logo was a lightning bolt. The book calls for neo-Nazi terror attacks against the government. Moynihan wrote the introduction to the book, in which he stated that:

The SIEGE volume you hold in your hands is intended both as a guide and a tool. For the observer, or the curious, it serves as a guide through the netherworld of extremist political thought.... this book offers a unique and direct access-point to understanding the philosophy, tactics, and propaganda of an increasingly militant and uncompromising brand of National Socialism. ... Secondly, and more importantly, this book is meant to serve as a practical tool. A majority of readers will hopefully not be mere sociologists or researchers, but rather that small faction of people who may be already predisposed towards these ideas. This certainly does not only refer to National Socialists, but revolutionaries and fanatics of all stripes.

His involvement in the book's success continued into its promotion. During this promotion, Moynihan participated in an interview in No Longer a Fanzine #5, conducted by Joseph A. Gervasi. In this interview, Moynihan spoke to his perspective on The Holocaust. In this interview, he states that he has "mix feelings" on the number of Jews killed in the genocide, positing that the claim that 6 million Jews died is "just arbitrary" and "probably a gross exaggeration." Moynihan would later shift away from National Socialist and fascist politics.

== Music ==
Influenced by first-wave industrial music artists such as SPK and Throbbing Gristle, Moynihan started his first electronic music project in 1984, which he called "Coup de Grâce". Along with audio cassette releases and live performances, Coup de Grâce also produced art booklets, posters, postcards, and texts. In 1988, at the age of 18, Moynihan published an edition of Friedrich Nietzsche's The Antichrist featuring artwork by Trevor Brown.

According to Moynihan, a cassette from his project Coup de Grâce was received by an art group called Club Moral in Belgium, resulting in a positive review in the cultural magazine they produced called Force Mental. Club Moral invited Moynihan to come to perform at In Vitro, an art and music festival in Antwerp. He accepted, which resulted in a small European tour of Belgium, Germany, and the Netherlands, while he was based in Antwerp, Belgium. In Germany, he came in contact with Cthulhu Records, the German underground label which would later release the first Blood Axis compilation tracks and album. Upon returning to Boston in the United States, he was invited to join the experimental music group Sleep Chamber.

While Moynihan was a member of Sleep Chamber, a friend of his who was active in the underground electronic music scene, Thomas Thorn, moved from Wisconsin to Boston and joined the band. According to Moynihan, a falling out occurred between Thorn and John Zewizz, founder of Sleep Chamber, resulting in Moynihan leaving Sleep Chamber and moving to Belgium, where he lived in the same warehouse where Club Moral had their home and offices.

Thorn, who had formed an electronic music project called Slave State in Wisconsin, visited Moynihan in Belgium in 1988 and the two collaborate for a live concert of Thorn's project. The show was produced by Club Moral and took place in a cellar underneath their headquarters in Antwerp. After relocating back to the US in 1989, Moynihan formed the musical group Blood Axis and no longer produced music under the name Coup de Grâce.

Experimental musician Boyd Rice invited Moynihan to go to Japan and collaborate with him on three NON performances there in 1989. Moynihan performed in concert with the various musical groups rotating around Tony Wakeford, Douglas P., and Rose McDowall who were also performing. His performance in Japan with NON was later released as the "Live in Osaka" DVD. That year, an album entitled Music, Martinis, and Misanthropy grew out of these collaborations. Moynihan also took the cover photo and did the graphic design work for the album, which was loosely based on the 1954 easy listening release by Jackie Gleason, Music, Martinis and Memories.

In 1995, Cthulhu Records released the first full-length album by Blood Axis, The Gospel of Inhumanity, and has seen several subsequent re-issues on various labels. It was followed by a second Blood Axis album in 1997 entitled Blót: Sacrifice in Sweden for the Swedish post-industrial music label Cold Meat Industry. In 2010, Blood Axis released a second studio album titled Born Again. Blood Axis was noted for using a speech by the British fascist Oswald Mosley and lyrics by the Nazi occultist Karl Maria Wiligut in music.

In 2001, Moynihan released a musical collaboration with French artist Les Joyaux de la Princesse entitled Absinthe: La Folie Verte themed around absinthe, a beverage Moynihan has expressed fondness for, and collaborated with Portland natives B'eirth of In Gowan Ring, his partner Annabel Lee and Markus Wolff of Waldteufel for a project dubbed Witch-Hunt. Largely playing traditional acoustic Irish folk music, the group played various local shows in Portland and also, in 2001, performed in Portugal, where the album Witch-Hunt: The Rites of Samhain was released. In 2008, Moynihan appeared on the album "Hoodwinked" by The Lindbergh Baby and an Italian language book entitled Day of Blood was published focusing on the musical group.

== Political views ==
In the 1990s, Moynihan was frequently characterized as a fascist or neo-fascist by some critics and fans. Moynihan accepted these descriptions with reservations, but in the 2000s dismissed them as inapplicable buzzwords used by "anti-this and anti-that activist types" and denounced the far-right.

Mattias Gardell writes in his 2003 book Gods of the Blood: "Featured in different contexts, Moynihan projects many different faces and has been classified as an 'extreme rightist', an 'extreme leftist', a Nazi, a fascist, and an anarchist". Gardell wrote that Moynihan was a priest in the Church of Satan but "rarely flashes his membership card" and instead "has long found the heathen path more rewarding".

Investigative journalist Kevin Coogan has linked Moynihan more explicitly with the extreme right but states that Moynihan does not fit into a "conventional definitions of fascism". Coogan has classified Moynihan as an "extreme rightist". Coogan states that Lords of Chaos "itself, however, is not a 'fascist' tract in the strict sense" and that "Moynihan [does not] himself fit easily into the more conventional definitions of fascism".

The album The Gospel of Inhumanity (1995) was favorably reviewed by far-right and neo-Nazi publications: the US Nazi skin journal Resistance (no. 6, 38) praised it as a "fascist symphony". The album also brought Moynihan to the attention of the German neo-Nazi scene, a favorable review appearing in Einheit und Kampf. Das revolutionäre Magazin für Nationalisten (no. 18, p. 29, Aufruhr-Verlag, Bremen). As a consequence, Moynihan was identified by anti-fascist activists in the late 1990s. Blood Axis performances attracted protesters, on one occasion in 1998, "about 75" San Francisco protesters mobilized by a flyer denouncing Moynihan as "a fascist and a hatemonger" succeeded in preventing his appearance. Moynihan dismissed activists labeling him a Nazi or a fascist as misinformed hysterical alarmism.

In 1999, Moynihan was one of several musicians listed by Southern Poverty Law Center's Intelligence Report magazine as examples of black metal music being used to recruit white supremacists. The magazine also excerpted an interview with No Longer a Fanzine, where Moynihan denied the Holocaust but said that he would "prefer it if it were true". The SPLC article was criticized by Decibel Magazine in 2006 which described it as being misleading and being poorly researched. In the Decibel article, Moynihan responded to the SPLC report, saying it was "packed with misinformation and outright errors" and focused "on a few provocative statements selectively culled from interviews done nearly 15 years ago". Gardell wrote in 2003 that "Though he certainly does not care about the overwhelming majority of mankind, my impression is that Moynihan cares even less about building gas chambers" and "What he presumably does care about is publicity, a craving that has resulted in quite a few oddities that will follow him for some time."

German social scientist Christian Dornbusch remarks that Moynihan's work "evokes a mindset which wants to design a future based on völkisch and fascist respectively national socialist thinkers. It's the same goal that the British fascist leader Sir Oswald Mosley rants about for minutes in the sample at the beginning of the live album Blot – Sacrifice in Sweden: '... we are fighting for nothing less than the revolution of the spirit of our people ...'".

Moynihan has repeatedly denied political ties. In response to the various political accusations leveled against him, Moynihan calls the far-right "a bunch of isolated losers" who are "all deluded". In response to accusations concerning the influence of his political views on the writing of Lords of Chaos, Moynihan made statements denouncing the far-right and white supremacism. The Southern Poverty Law Center later listed Moynihan as an intellectual leader of the far right for statements such as "The number of six million [Jews killed in the Holocaust] is just arbitrary and inaccurate [...] If I were given the opportunity to start up the next Holocaust, I would definitely have more lenient entry requirements than the Nazis."

The anti-fascist researcher Spencer Sunshine offered this assessment of Moynihan's political evolution in 2024:

Moynihan’s politics—or at least his representation of them—went in phases. In the first, roughly from 1989 to 1993, he was explicit about his interest in and desire to promote Masonite National Socialism while embracing Social Darwinism. By 1994, in the second stage, his self-identification moved closer to “fascist.” In the third, after Lords of Chaos came out in 1998, he became quite cagey and represented his view as being neither Left nor Right but also specified that they were neither National Socialist nor Social Darwinist. This was quickly followed by a fourth stage. Although still promoting Nazis and collaborators like Wiligut and Evola, Moynihan began expressing his allegiance to what could be called an ethno-separatism (although he did not use the term) based on sub-racial identities, a la de Benoist, and started using the description "radical traditionalist."

== Personal life ==
Moynihan has a child with his partner Annabel.

== Bibliography ==
Co-authored by Moynihan

- Apocalypse Culture II edited by Adam Parfrey, with several contributions by Moynihan, Feral House, 2000, ISBN 0-922915-57-1
- Lords of Chaos: The Bloody Rise of the Satanic Metal Underground co-authored with Didrik Søderlind, Feral House, ISBN 0-922915-48-2; revised and enlarged edition, 2003, ISBN 0-922915-94-6
- Book of Lies: The Disinformation Guide to Magick and the Occult, edited by Richard Metzger, with contributions by Moynihan, Disinformation Books, 2003, ISBN 0-9713942-7-X
- The Secret King: The Myth and Reality of Nazi Occultism, co-authored with Stephen E. Flowers, Feral House, 2007, ISBN 978-1932595253
- The Command to Look: A Master Photographer's Method for Controlling the Human Gaze, with a contribution from Moynihan, Feral House, 2014, ISBN 978-1627310017

Edited by Moynihan

- The Final Incision, art booklet with international contributors. Coup De Grâce, 1984.
- Der Antichrist by Friedrich Nietzsche. Illustrated by Trevor Brown. Antwerp: C.D.G., 1988.
- Siege: The Collected Writings of James Mason by James Mason, edited and introduced by Moynihan, Storm Books, 1992.
- The Secret King: Karl Maria Wiligut, Himmler's Lord of the Runes, edited and prefaced by Moynihan, Dominion Press, 2001, ISBN 0-9712044-0-3. Revised and expanded edition, The Secret King: The Myth and Reality of Nazi Occultism, Feral House, 2007, ISBN 978-1932595253.
- Introduction to Magic: Rituals and Practical Techniques for the Magus by Julius Evola and the UR Group, edited by Moynihan, Inner Traditions, 2001, ISBN 0-89281-624-4.
- Men Among the Ruins: Post-War Reflections of a Radical Traditionalist by Julius Evola, edited by Moynihan, Inner Traditions International, 2002, ISBN 0-89281-905-7.
- Little Anatomy of the Physical Unconscious, or The Anatomy of the Image by Hans Bellmer. Translated from the French and with an introduction by Jon Graham. Foreword by Joe Coleman. Edited, designed, and typeset by Moynihan and Annabel Lee, Limited edition of 1,100 number copies. Dominion, 2004, ISBN 0-9712044-2-X.
- Confessions of a Radical Traditionalist, a collection of essays by John Michell selected and introduced by Joscelyn Godwin, edited by Michael Moynihan and Annabel Lee, designed and typeset by Michael Moynihan, Dominion, 2005, ISBN 0-9712044-4-6.
- American Grotesque: The Life and Art of William Mortensen, co-edited by Moynihan and Larry Lytle, Feral House, 2014, ISBN 978-1-9362399-7-9.
- The Command to Look: A Master Photographer's Method for Controlling the Human Gaze, by William Mortensen and George Dunham, with essays by Larry Lytle and Michael Moynihan. Feral House, 2014, ISBN 978-1-6273100-1-7.
- Tyr: Myth—Culture—Tradition Vol. 1, Ultra (2002), ISBN 0-9720292-0-6.
- Tyr: Myth—Culture—Tradition Vol. 2, Ultra (2004), ISBN 0-9720292-1-4.
- Tyr: Myth—Culture—Tradition Vol. 3, Ultra (2007); reprint: Arcana Europa 2019, ISBN 0-9997245-5-X.
- Tyr: Myth—Culture—Tradition Vol. 4, Ultra (2014), ISBN 0-9720292-4-9.
- Tyr: Myth—Culture—Tradition Vol. 5, Arcana Europa (2018).

Translated by Moynihan

Barbarian Rites: The Spiritual World of the Vikings and Germanic Tribes by Hans-Peter Hasenfratz, Ph.D. Translated and edited, and with a Foreword by Moynihan. Inner Traditions, 2011, ISBN 1-59477-421-8.
