= Playlist markup language =

A playlist markup language is a markup language that specifies the contents and playback of a digital multimedia playlist; this includes streams of music, slideshows or even animations.

== List of playlist markup languages ==
- .asx, an XML style playlist containing more information about the items on the playlist.
- .smil is an XML recommendation of the World Wide Web Consortium that includes playlist features.
- Kalliope PlayList (.kpl) is a kind of XML playlist storing developed to speed up loading and managing playlists.
- .pla, Samsung format(?), binary, Winamp handles these
- XSPF, an XML format designed to enable playlist sharing.
- WPL is an XML format used in Microsoft Windows Media Player versions 9–11.
