= Crash Worship =

American experimental musical group

Background information
- Also known as: Crash Worship ADRV
- Origin: San Diego, California, United States
- Genres: Experimental; industrial
- Years active: 1986–2000s
- Labels: Charnel; Cold Spring; ¡Alarma!; Rocco Fresco; ROIR
- Members: Simon Cheffins; Markus Wolff; Jeff Mattson; JXL; "Fat" Jack Torino; Dreiky Caprice; Ryan Jencks
- Past members: Zoli Zombori; Steve Griffin; Trudy Truelove; John Goff; Rick Froberg; Madam Saruh; Nadia Hagan; Trachio; Pieter Schoolwerth; AMJ; R. L. Naefke; C. Wssl; Adam Nodelman; Oliver Octavio; Seth Rosko; Mr. Quintron; Tim North; Koshka Howell; Sam Zimmerman; Chris Alley

Crash Worship or ADRV (Adoración de rotura violenta, Spanish for "crash worship") was a San Diego, California based experimental music and performance art ensemble formed in 1986. They were most renowned for live performances partly inspired by the confrontational Viennese Actionism movement of the 1960s. The musical element featured three stand-up percussionists who hammered out industrial and tribal poly-rhythms accompanied by highly unorthodox electric guitar, synthesizers, sound effects and dueling vocalists. Audience members were showered in various substances such as blood, wine and honey while, band members ignited combustibles and set fires within the performance area. Crash Worship also released several albums and singles of both live and studio-recorded music. Mostly self-produced (unusually packaged and laboriously handcrafted) works in visually stunning screen printed metal splattered with paint, urine, blood and other esoterica. Although they toured playing music from their recorded material, the celebratory nature of these events left each show open to spontaneity and improvisation.

== Biography ==
Crash Worship began circa 1986, although the band has stated that it is difficult to pinpoint an exact moment when it began given the constantly evolving roster of members. Their early releases became known for their unusual and creative packaging. The first cassette releases, This and The Science of Ecstasy came with hand-made covers and extensive sleeves with a variety of drawings. Their first 12", Flow, was a detourned college recording class project where every other track on the vinyl compilation aside from the one contributed by Crash Worship was rendered unplayable by hand carvings and silkscreen and the records were relabeled and repackaged. This aesthetic continued through their last album, which featured a trifold package with screen printed copper foil.

Initially starting as a studio project, Crash Worship soon learned the power of a live audience. During performances, the band's members (or often provocateurs) would manipulate the crowd, involving them more deeply into the show, ultimately eliminating any boundaries between spectator and performer. The musicians would also mobilize their instruments on and off the stage into the middle of the audience (or outside), lighting explosives and hosing down the crowd with various liquids creating an atmosphere of celebratory abandon and mirth. Strobe lights, nudity, mysterious liquids, sex and smoke filled rooms (at next to zero visibility) were all a part of the average show. The chaos of these events often invited unwanted attention from police who would later forcibly shut down a large percentage of the band's performances.

=== BLOOD & FIRE ===
After much successful touring of the United States, Crash Worship followed suit with two full European tours in the mid-1990s. It was also around this time the band was deemed "unmanageable" by many labels, booking agencies and clubs which proved difficult to tour much afterward. At the height of their notoriety, Crash Worship had been banned from countless other cities across the United States making it almost impossible to tour there or abroad.

In late 1999, the last Crash Worship performances were held in California, four being with the Master Musicians of Jajouka (in the Bay Area), the Aztlan Theatre (abandoned Los Angeles County Jail), and to a female only audience in San Francisco. The final Crash Worship performance was held in San Diego, California on October 24, 1999, with Physics and Tarantula Hawk as openers. Members are now scattered around the U.S. in New Orleans, Portland, Tucson, New York City, San Diego and the Bay Area, active with their own solo and side projects.

== Members (in alphabetical order by last name) ==
- Simon Cheffins – percussion, tapes, effects
- Rick Froberg - drums
- John Goff – bagpipes, drums
- Steve Griffin – drums
- Nadia Hagen – guitar, vocals
- Ryan Jencks – Guitar, electronics, blood and fire
- JXL – vocals, Moog synthesizer, tape manipulation, explosives
- Dreiky Caprice – percussion, vocals
- Jeff Mattson – guitar, Megalyra, horns, effects
- Adam Nodelman – Bass, Moog Synthesizer
- J Poggi aka MC Trachiotomy – horns, vocals
- Seth Rosko - vocals, sampler, Trombone, pyrotechnics, lighting
- Pieter "Wierd" Schoolwerth aka Bonaparte – pyrotechnics
- "Fat" Jack Torino aka Domingo De Santa Clara – vocals, Moog synthesizer, tape manipulation, explosives
- Markus Wolff aka Nebulon / Wolf Carcass – percussion
- Zoli Zombory – synthesizer

== Discography ==
=== Studio albums ===
- This - CS (1987), ¡Alarma!
- The Science of Ecstasy - CS (1989), Rocco Fresco
- ¡Espontáneo! - CS & CD (1991), Charnel
- Triple Mania II - CS & CD (1994), Charnel

=== EPs ===
- What So Ever Thy Hand Findeth - Do It with All Thine Might - LP (1989), Alarma
- Pillar of Fire - LP (1990), Alamut

=== Singles ===
- Flow - 12" (1989), Rocco Fresco
- ¡Pyru! - 7" (1994), Charnel
- In the Labyrinth of the Master - 7" (1996), Vinyl Communications

=== Compilations ===
- Asesinos - CD (1992), Cold Spring (re-released on ROIR 1995)
- Pyru Remixes - CD (1999), ¡Alarma!

=== Videos ===
- Inflammatorio - VHS (1991), ¡Alarma!
- Euro Promo - VHS (1994), ¡Alarma!
- Japan Promo - VHS (1997), ¡Alarma!
