= Michel Bellen =

Belgian serial killer (1946–2020)

- Born: 13 January 1946; Antwerp, Belgium
- Died: 10 June 2020 (aged 74); Bierbeek, Belgium
- Other name: Wurger van Linkeroever
- Penalty: Death; commuted to life imprisonment

Details
- Victims: 4
- Span of crimes: 1964–1982
- Country: Belgium
- Date apprehended: 1982

Michel Bellen (13 January 1946 – 10 June 2020), also called the Linkeroever Strangler (Dutch: Wurger van Linkeroever), was a Belgian murderer regarded as the first serial killer in Flanders.

In August 1964, he raped a woman after chasing her from the supermarket in Linkeroever. The woman was able to escape. After this first rape, Bellen would eventually commit three murders. The first murder happened in December 1964. After the rape of a 21-year-old nurse, he strangled her in an alley with a piece of barbed wire. A month later, in 1965, he raped and murdered a 37-year-old nurse. In 1966, he was sentenced to death by the Assize Court, albeit his sentence was later converted to life in prison. However, in 1982 he was released on parole. After four months, however, Bellen murdered a student in her flat room in Leuven. He was imprisoned again after his conviction in March 1984. From 1989 to 1994 he corresponded with artist Danny Devos, which resulted in a number of art projects and performances.

Bellen died of heart failure in a psychiatric institution in Bierbeek on the night of 10 June 2020 at the age of 74.

== See also ==
- List of serial killers by country
