= Anne-Mie van Kerckhoven =

Belgian artist

Anne-Mie Van Kerckhoven
- Born: 5 December 1951 (age 74); Antwerp
- Known for: Painting, drawing, computer art, video art
- Spouse: Danny Devos

Anne-Mie Van Kerckhoven (born 5 December 1951 in Antwerp) is a Belgian artist whose work involves painting, drawing, computer art and video art.

== Biography ==
Anne-Mie Van Kerckhoven (also known as AMVK) was born in Antwerp and lives in Antwerp and Berlin. In 1981 she founded the noise band Club Moral with Danny Devos. Since 1982 she has been represented by Zeno X Gallery in Antwerp, Belgium, and since 1999 by Galerie Barbara Thumm in Berlin. In 2003 she was awarded the Flanders' Prize for Visual Arts.

In 2005 the HeadNurse-files was published. By means of installation shots, film stills and artistic images, this book presents an overview of the projects' development from 1995 to 2004 and possibly beyond. In 2006 she was awarded a DAAD stipendium to spend one year in Berlin. In 2022 she obtained an honorary doctor degree from the University of Antwerp.

== Life and work ==
Anne-Mie Van Kerckhoven has been fascinated for a long time with the representation in the mass media of images of women, of interiors, of the kinetic powers of any kind of language. She investigates supra-moral connections in contemporary society between sex and technology. Her work connects different knowledge systems, explores the areas of the unconscious, and looks at moral aberrations or the obscene from a female point of view.

Since 2005 she has been working on a conceptual and pictorial trialogue between the mystic Marguerite Porete, the hermetic Giordano Bruno and the philosopher Herbert Marcuse.

== Selected exhibitions ==
=== Solo ===
- Anne-Mie Van Kerckhoven, Zeno X Gallery Antwerp, 1995
- Morele Herbewapening / Moral Rearmament, Kunsthalle Lophem 1996
- HeadNurse, Zeno X Gallery Antwerp, 1998
- Nursing care, in melancholy stupor, MuHKA Antwerp, 1999
- Prober5, Galerie Barbara Thumm Berlin, 2000
- In Dreams, Galerie Barbara Thumm 2003
- Deeper, Kunsthalle Lophem 2003
- AntiSade, Zeno X Gallery Antwerpen, 2003
- How reliable is the brain?, Neuer Aachener Kunstverein, Aachen, 2004
- AMVK – EZFK: Europaisches Zentrum für Futuristische Kunst (Kunsthalle Bern) 2005.
- Veerkracht thuis!, Objectif exhibitions Antwerp, 2006
- Oh, the Sick Lady / Ah, the Sick Lady (Explodes from Within), Galerie Barbara Thumm Berlin, 2007
- Über das ICH (Willkür und Transzendenz) and a lot of fun (daadgalerie Berlin) 2007
- Nothing More Natural, Kunstmuseum Luzern Lucerne, 2008
- Nothing More Natural, Wiels Center for Contemporary Art, Brussels, 2008
- Nothing More Natural, Kunsthalle Nürnberg Nuremberg 2009
- On Mars the Rising Sun is Blue, Zeno X Gallery Antwerp, 2009
- In a Saturnian World, Renaissance Society Chicago 2011
- Mistress of the Horizon, Mu.ZEE Ostend, 2012
- 3 Carrels (Degenerate Customized Solutions), Zeno X Gallery Antwerp, 2014
- Serving Compressed Energy with Vacuum, Kunstverein München Munich, 2015
- AMVK, MuHKA, Antwerp 2018
- AMVK, Museum Fridericianum, Kassel, 2018

=== Group ===
- Woord en Beeld, MuHKA Antwerp, 1992
- Trouble spot.painting (MuHKA/NICC) Antwerp 1999
- Die Verletzte Diva, Galerie im Taxispalais Berlin, 2000
- Dream Extensions Ghent 2004
- Dear ICC, MuHKA Antwerp, 2004
- Collectiepresentatie XI, MuHKA Antwerp
- Extremities. Flemish art in Vladivostok, Museum Artetage, Vladivostok, 2006
- Collectiepresentatie XVI: Attributen en Substantie, MuHKA Antwerp, 2006
- I Walk the Lines, Galerie Barbara Thumm Berlin, 2006
- Manifesta 7 / "THE SOUL (or, Much Trouble in the Transportation of Souls)", Manifesta 7 Trento, 2006
