= Extra Action Marching Band =

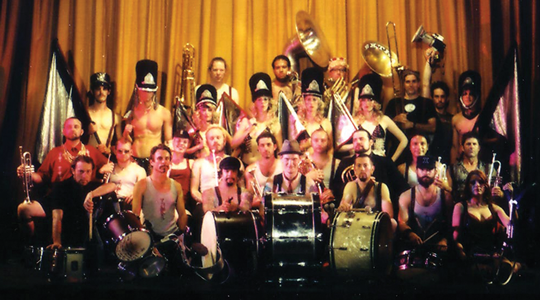
- 2006 East Coast Tour

Background information
- Origin: Oakland, CA
- Genres: Marching band, Punk rock, Brass Band
- Years active: 1998-2026
- Website: http://extra-action.com

The Extra Action Marching Band was an American musical group loosely based on the American marching band construct. The instrumentation was entirely brass, drums and one modified bullhorn. At performances, provocatively flamboyant cheerleaders with pom-poms and flags engage the audience.

"There's really no need to introduce the Extra Action Marching Band: The Bay Area institution has been crashing parties, invading bars, and blowing minds with its signature "high school marching band on acid" punk-meets-Sousa bombast for years now. The tuba players, flag team, and percussion section take perverse delight in twisting the staid conventions of their respective forms, and it can be downright disorienting to spot a sexy trombone player." - Hiya Swanhuyser – SF Weekly 2005

“… performance at the… Hollywood Bowl… Not bad for a bunch of temperamental weirdos who were once paid in gift certificates to a sex toy shop [payment for playing at the opening of Good Vibrations vibrator store for women]” –SPIN Magazine, Feb 2006

== History ==
Simon Cheffins of the San Diego–based Crash Worship started Extra Action in 1999 after relocating to Bay Area. The band expanded from a loose configuration of under a dozen to approximately 35 members.

A non-musical project by Extra Action was "La Contessa", a half-scale replica of a wooden Spanish seagoing galleon built around a school bus. The massive ship was burned to the ground in early December 2006 by Mike Stewart, a disgruntled Nevada resident who owned the land that La Contessa was being stored on.

In March 2026 a message was posted to Extra Action's official website announcing that the group was "calling it quits."

== Performance highlights ==
The band's musical styles and influences include the Master Musicians of Joujouka, funk, circus music, New Orleans jazz, Black Sabbath, and gypsy music from Eastern Europe.

The group often appeared uninvited at corporate events, protests, marches, weddings, and other public occasions. They appeared unexpectedly at a book signing by David Byrne, which impressed Byrne so much that he invited them as an opening act for various performances in California.

Other performance highlights included stopping at the Hollywood Bowl, and later sloshing through three inches of toilet water that covered the entire floor of the San Diego club the Casbah. A tour of the American South re-created Black Sabbath's heavy-metal debut, with plain ole heavy eXtreme Elvis on vocals. After these performances, Extra Action performed at other large venues such as the Download Festival (U.S. version), where they performed on stage with Modest Mouse and Arcade Fire, as well as the Fusion Festival (Germany) and the Rock for People festival (Czech Republic) in 2007, and festival I.D.E.A.L. in France (2008), to name a few. However, the band was most at home in small to medium-sized venues where they could get up close and personal with the audience (often spending more time in the audience than on stage). Sex and sensuality played a key role in this group's dynamic and stage (as well as floor) presence. Also of note was the manner in which the band used "military-style" formations to careen through, corral, and otherwise manipulate its audiences.

== Press quotes ==
"Witness them perform and they don't as much walk on stage as storm it . . .Their music has been described as a fusion of Balkan brass and New Orleans funk, which references circus themes and Black Sabbath's first album." - Dazed & Confused (magazine)

"When they marched onto the stage at Shoreline Amphitheater to join Arcade Fire (after crashing the women's room) at last year's Download Festival — ragtag horn and drum corps ripping through a few numbers as the flag girls and boy bumped and grinded in blond wigs and glittery G-strings — you realized what was really missing from indie at this performance, at so many performances: sex appeal. Theater. A drunken mastery of performance and the dark arts of showmanship, along with the sense of team spirit linked to so much marching band imagery bandied about in today's pop." - SF BAY GUARDIAN

== Tours ==
West Coast 2015: Portland, Oregon; Eugene, Oregon; Olympia, Washington; Honk! Fest in Seattle, Washington

East Coast 2014: NYC, Kingston

East Coast 2013: NYC, Mermaid Parade, an Abandoned Subway Station

Europe 2012: Germany, Switzerland

Europe 2007: NYC, the Netherlands, Germany, Czech Republic, Austria, Switzerland, Italy

East Coast 2006: New York, Asbury Park, Boston, Providence

East Coast 2005: Chicago, Detroit, Toronto, some hippy festival somewhere in Connecticut, Providence, New York,

Europe 2004: the Netherlands, Germany, Czech, Guča Festival in Serbia, Austria

Playing Black Sabbath's first album with Extreme Elvis 2003: New Orleans, Fort Worth, Austin, Phoenix, Las Vegas, LA, San Francisco

== Recordings and DVDs ==
- The Triumph of Fascination (EP)
- Live on Stubnitz Recorded Live on the Motorship Stubnitz
- The Burning Wigs of Sedition
- Extra Action in Euroland documentary of Europe tour 2004
