= Club Moral =

Belgian artist collective and noise band

- Origin: Antwerp, Belgium
- Genres: Noise; Power electronics
- Years active: 1981–present

Club Moral is a Belgian artist collective and noise band formed in 1981 by Danny Devos and Anne-Mie van Kerckhoven based in Antwerp, Belgium. They are known for their controversial performances and imagery. In 2001 "Dylan" briefly joined the band. Between 2003 and 2011 Mauro Pawlowski joined the band. And in 2010 and 2011 Aldo Struyf played bass and Orphan Fairytale played harps in the band. Since 2012 Devos and van Kerckhoven are the sole member performing music concerts.

== History ==
=== 1981-1987 ===
From 1981 until 1987 Club Moral acted as both a venue and performance band. Club Moral the venue was in Antwerp where numerous exhibitions, performances, concerts, lectures and film-shows were organized. Club Moral the band had its first performance on September 19, 1981. The show was billed as an "Attack" and took place at the event "Das Konzil", organized by Boris Nieslony in the Künstlerhaus of Stuttgart, Germany. According to DDV, "The Club Moral 'attack' took place in a small room with no windows and all 4 walls covered with mattresses. We played very loud with heavy bass volumes. At the end of the concert people were complaining of nausea and vomiting."

As a venue, the first documented show at Club Moral took place June 19, 1981 and featured Etat Brut performing live with Mécanique Végétale.

Club Moral continued to both perform and act as a venue through 1987. Acts that have performed at Club Moral have included Boyd Rice (NON), Michael Moynihan (Coup De Grace), Slave State, Whitehouse, Trevor Brown, Culturcide, John Duncan, Jack Stevenson and many, many more.

Since 1983 they published a magazine Force Mental, of which 15 issues have appeared in print. A sixteenth issue was published on the internet in 2004 and a 'Force Mental RVSTD' facsimile edition of all issues was printed in 2010.

=== 2004-present ===
In 2005 Club Moral was declared dead by its founders and a War Memorial made for all those who ever performed, played or exhibited at Club Moral or contributed to Force Mental. About 300 names carved in a slab of green marble, 140 x 280 cm. The monument resides in the Royal Academy of Fine Arts (Antwerp).

The noise band claimed to cease its activities after a performance at the Death Petrol festival in Antwerp, Belgium; in 2006, Club Moral restructured as a new band called Bum Collar, an anagram of the band name with a new member: Belgian writer Paul Mennes.

Bum Collar performed a number of gigs between 2006 and 2007, but in late 2007 Club Moral was resurrected for a show at De Resoor, Sint-Truiden. The show was billed as, "After two years of silence Club Moral will perform on stage live again. We have abandoned our improvisational gigs and get back to our original repertoire with stunning versions of our best tracks. An opportunity not to miss!".

In 2010 a new series of concerts took off with Danny Devos on vocals, Anne-Mie Van Kerckhoven on electronics, Mauro Pawlowski on drums and Aldo Struyf on bass.

Since 2015 Club Moral performed several times in its original setting with Devos on vocals and electronics and Van Kerckhoven on electronics. On both occasions the performance was on the occasion of an exhibition by Van Kerckhoven, at the Kunstverein München and castillo/corrales in Paris.

== Discography ==
- CM003 - Mit Neuen Waffen (1981) C-60 Cassette
- CM004 - Zeno X (1981) C-30 Cassette + Poster + Original artwork by AMVK
- CM007 - Blanco (1982) C-90 Cassette compilation
- CM016 - Attack On Stuttgart (1983) C-60 Cassette
- CM026 - Cross of the Good Death (1983) C-30 Cassette + Poster
- CM031 - 19 Keys (1983) C-90 Cassette
- X3 - 20.000 Mijlen Over De Schelde (1984) Cassette on Zwijntape
- CM039 - The Parts: Auschwitz war Wunderbar (1983) C-60 Cassette
- CM043 - Propagandum (1984) C-90 Cassette compilation + Booklet
- CM044 - C.M. Live in the Country (1984) C-60 Cassette
- CM055 - 19 Enochian keys by 19 bands (1986) 2 x C-60 Cassette compilation
- CM061 - Live Outtakes (1986) C-90 Cassette
- ST 00G - Club Moral (1986) C-60 Cassette on Staalplaat
- To All Who Are Interested (1989) lP on Cthulhu Records, Germany
- Instruments of Attraction I: Cerebrale Pathologie (2003) 10" lP on Kapellmeister, Belgium
- CM066 - Living(stone) (2004)CD
- CM067 - User Handbook (2004) CDR
- DMR014 - Lonely Weekends (2006) 7" single on Dead Mind Records
- CM073 - Bum Collar (2006) CDR
- CM080 - Felix Culpa (2008) CDR
- trash052 - Mit Neuen Waffen (2010) CD on Trash Ritual (reissue)
- NBIDE#2 - Instruments of Attraction II: Sociale Hygiëne (2010) 10" lp on No Basement is Deep Enough, Serbia
