= Simon Cheffins =

British musician

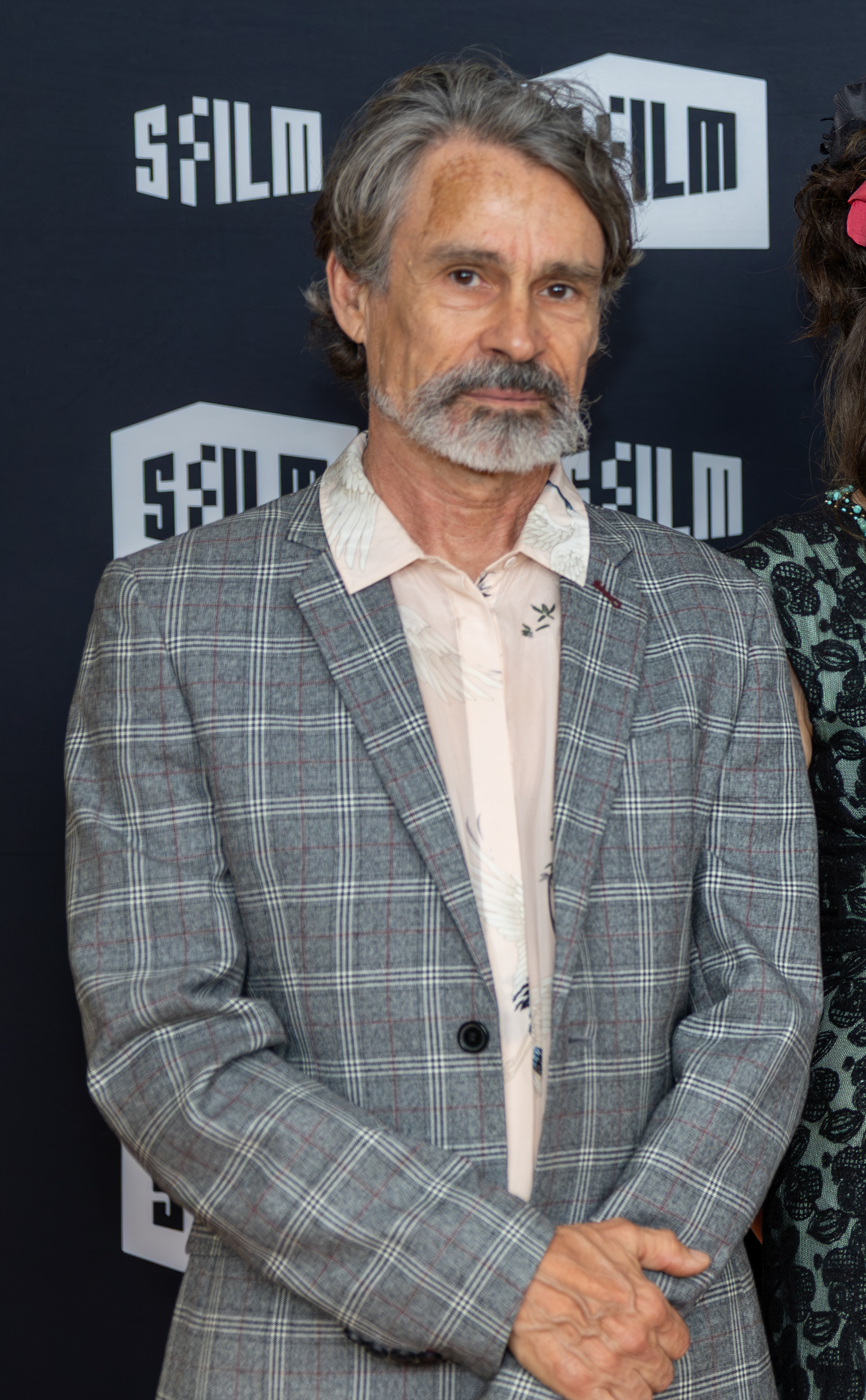
Cheffins at SFFILM in 2026

Simon Cheffins is a British-American percussionist. Founding member of Crash Worship, Blood Lake, and the Extra Action Marching Band. He currently resides in San Francisco.
