= Institute of Evolutionary Biology =

Research center in Catalonia, Spain

Institute of Evolutionary Biology CSIC - Pompeu Fabra University
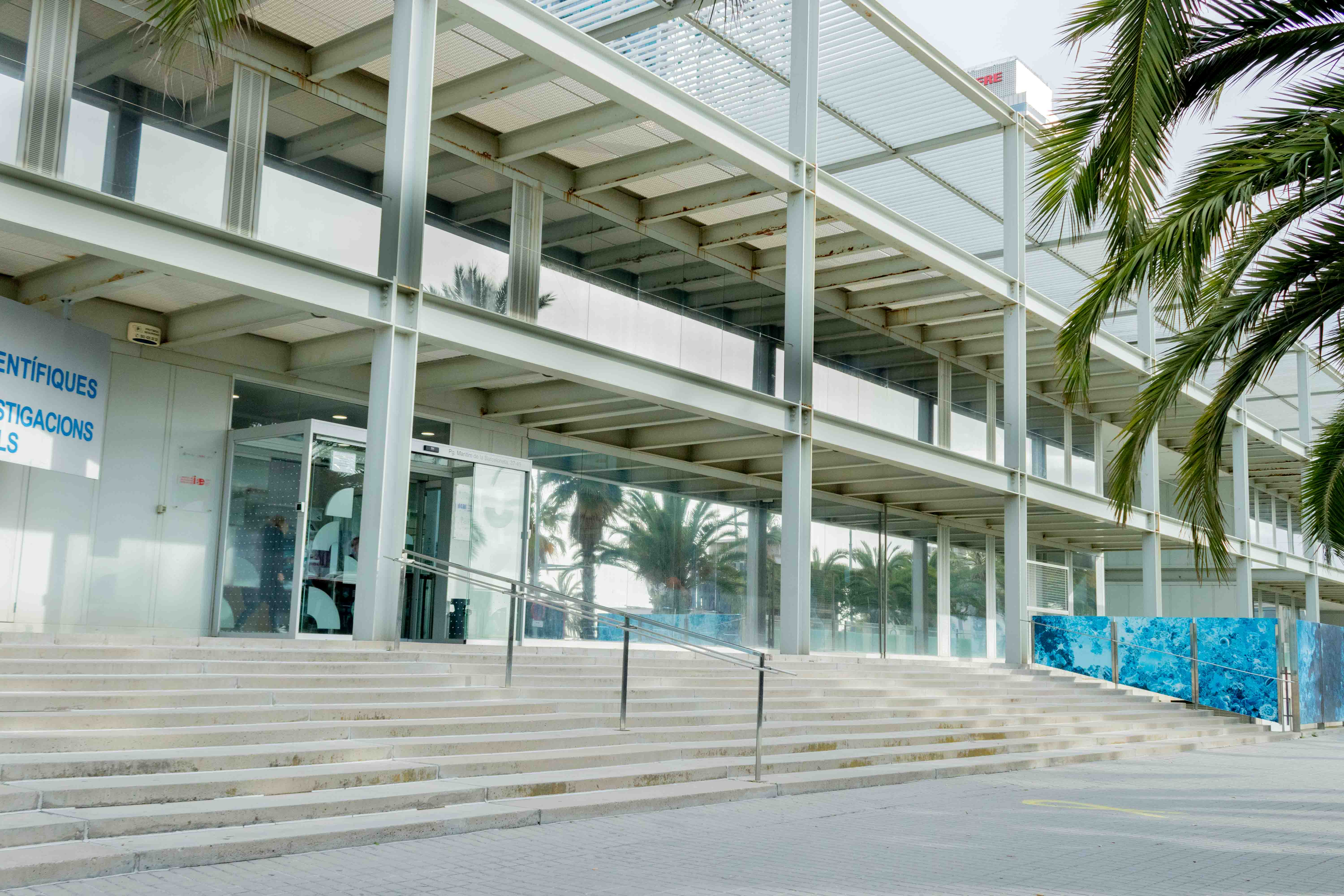
- One of the two IBE locations
- Other names: IBE
- Established: 2008
- Director: Salvador Carranza
- Academic staff: 23
- Administrative staff: 108
- Students: 36
- Doctoral students: 36
- Other students: 18
- Location: Barcelona, Catalonia, Spain
- Campus: Urban
- Website: www.ibe.upf-csic.es/home

The Institute of Evolutionary Biology (In Spanish Instituto de Biología Evolutiva IBE (CSIC-UPF) is a joint research center of Pompeu Fabra University (UPF) and the Spanish National Research Council (CSIC) founded in 2008. IBE is the only research center in Catalonia and the rest of Spain that is entirely dedicated to evolutionary biology and natural resources.

The research carried out by IBE focuses on the study of the processes and mechanisms for the generation and maintenance of biodiversity and its conservation. This is one of the most important scientific challenges of the 21st century, as evidenced by new global initiatives to sequence the genomes of all known species and discover the remaining 80 percent of currently unknown species, including the Earth BioGenome Project. To meet this global challenge requires the methods and concepts of evolutionary biology; and in particular, the understanding of the bases of the differences between organisms, both between species and within them, and how these differences produce new functions and interactions, which will determine the basic mechanisms of life and place biodiversity in a robust evolutionary framework. To this end, IBE research uses the new tools available, experimental and computational, to understand the basic functioning of life, discover the mechanisms for generating biological innovations and preserve biodiversity and promote its management in a sustainable way.

In July 2008, Dr. Xavier Bellés was appointed director of the IBE. In February 2017 he was succeeded in office by Dr. Tomàs Marquès-Bonet as director of the center. Since May 2020, the IBE has been headed by Dr. Salvador Carranza.

== Academics ==
The scientific activity of IBE is organized in 5 interrelated research programs:

- Animal Biodiversity and Evolution
- Comparative and Computational Genomics
- Functional Genomics and Evolution
- Population Genetics
- Complex Systems

== Campus ==
IBE employs more than one hundred and thirty people, distributed among the neighboring buildings of the Barcelona Biomedical Research Park (PRBB) and the Mediterranean Center for Marine and Environmental Research (CMIMA). Currently, IBE is in the process of moving to a new campus at the Mercat del Peix, an innovation complex, focused on biomedicine, biodiversity, and planetary well-being, which will be located next to the UPF Ciutadella campus and the Ciutadella Park. The Mercat del Peix project will involve the construction of three new buildings, which will house the Institute of Evolutionary Biology (IBE), the Barcelona Institute of Science and Technology (BIST) and a new complex at the Pompeu Fabra University (UPF). These will be built on the area of 7,500 square meters that is currently a car park and which was, until the middle of the 20th century, the central fish market of Barcelona (Mercat del Peix). The works will begin in April 2022 and the first researchers will begin to work at the center in the first half of 2025. The project is promoted by the City Council of Barcelona and UPF, with the participation of two strategic partners, the Spanish National Research Council and BIST.

== Notable faculty ==
- Carles Lalueza-Fox (Ancient DNA)
- Luc Steels (Artificial Intellence)

== See also ==
- Pompeu Fabra University Notable Faculty
