= Barcelona Biomedical Research Park =

Spanish agglomeration of research centres

Coordinates: 41.385277°N 2.193317°E

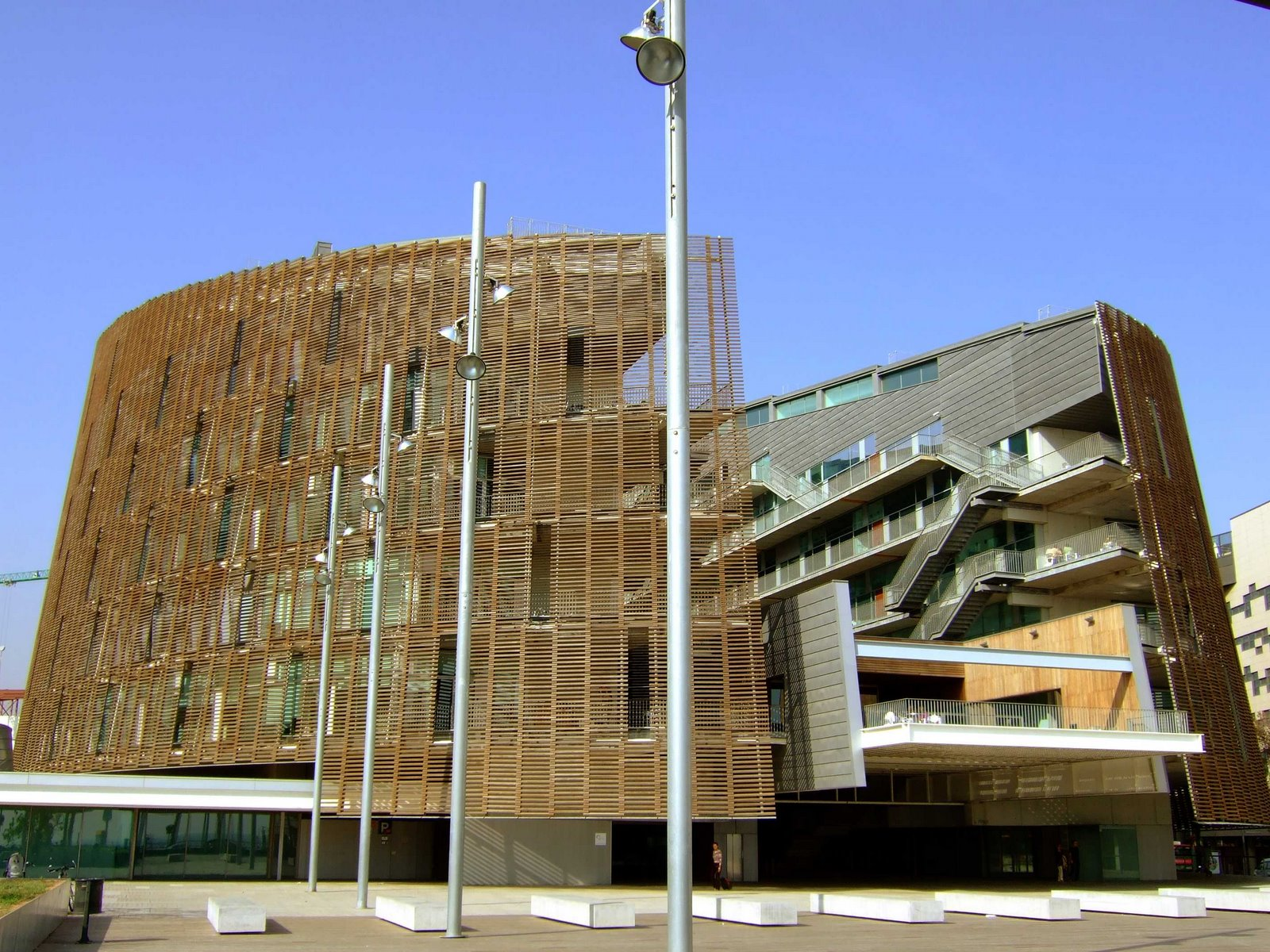
The main building of the PRBB viewed from the south

The Barcelona Biomedical Research Park ("PRBB") is an agglomeration of six public research centres and is located alongside the Hospital del Mar de Barcelona. The PRBB is the product of an initiative launched by the Government of Catalonia, the City Council of Barcelona and the Pompeu Fabra University (UPF), which aims to promote research and collaboration between closely related fields. Each centre works independently in its own field and a management group, the PRBB Consortium, is responsible for managing the building and facilities, in addition to coordinating joint scientific research activities among the various centres. About 1,400 people are employed in the PRBB, making it one of the largest biomedical research clusters in the south of Europe. The centre was opened in May 2006.

The PRBB building was designed by the architects Manuel Brullet i Tenas and Albert de Pineda i Àlvarez.

== Overview ==
PRBB comprises the following six research centres:

- Hospital del Mar Medical Research Institute (IMIM)
- Department of Experimental and Health Sciences of the Pompeu Fabra University (CEXS-UPF)
- Centre for Genomic Regulation (CRG)
- Barcelona Institute for Global Health (ISGlobal)
- Institute of Evolutionary Biology (IBE:CSIC-UPF)
- Barcelona European Molecular Biology Laboratory (EMBL - Barcelona)

The PRBB aims to generate new knowledge in the health and life sciences, and to facilitate transfer of technology and knowledge into industry, while providing training and facilities to its research staff. Doctoral research carried out at the PRBB is accredited by Pompeu Fabra University.

The PRBB has six main research streams, which range in scale from molecular biology to the population level biostatistics and epidemiology, including:

- Gene regulation and epigenetics
- Cellular biology and developmental biology
- Pharmacology and clinical research
- Biomedical informatics and systems biology
- Human genetics and evolutionary biology
- Epidemiology and public health
