= Dangerous Goods Safety Advisor =

A Dangerous Goods Safety Advisor (DGSA) is a consultant or an owner or employee of an organization appointed by an organization that transports, loads, or unloads dangerous goods in the European Union and other countries. This include 48 countries : Albania, Andorra, Austria, Azerbaijan, Belarus, Belgium, Bosnia and Herzegovina, Bulgaria, Croatia, Cyprus, Czech Republic, Denmark, Estonia, Finland, France, Germany, Greece, Hungary, Iceland, Ireland, Italy, Kazakhstan, Latvia, Liechtenstein, Lithuania, Luxembourg, Macedonia, Malta, Montenegro, Morocco, Netherlands, Norway, Poland, Portugal, The Republic of Moldova, Romania, Russia, Serbia, Slovakia, Slovenia, Spain, Sweden, Switzerland, Tajikistan, Tunisia, Turkey, Ukraine, United Kingdom.

== Rules ==
The rules involving the transport of dangerous goods are complex and each mode of transport, i.e. road, rail or inland waterway, has its own set of regulations. There are also separate sets of regulations for sea and air transportation. For many elements of transportation, the regulations from each mode are similar or identical. All the various sets of regulations are based upon "Recommendations on the transport of Dangerous Goods - Model Regulations", known as "The Orange Book," issued by the United Nations Committee of Experts on the Transportation of Dangerous Goods and the Globally Harmonized System of Classification and Labeling.

== Duties ==
The duties of the DGSA include providing advice to the appointing organization, preparing accident reports, monitoring the activities of the organisation which involve dangerous goods and preparing an annual report.

To become a DGSA, it is usual for a candidate to be trained by a specialist training organization, then to sit various examinations. The qualification lasts five years. The examining body in the UK is the Scottish Qualifications Authority.
