= Freddy Horion =

Belgian murderer

- Born: 21 September 1947 (age 79); Ghent, Belgium
- Other name: de Zonnebril
- Penalty: Life imprisonment

Details
- Victims: 6
- Span of crimes: 2 February 1979 – 23 June 1979
- Country: Belgium
- Date apprehended: 26 June 1979

Freddy André Horion (born 21 September 1947), also known as Sunglasses (Dutch: de Zonnebril) and The Monster, is a Belgian convicted murderer. Along with Roland Feneulle (9 September 1953 – 22 October 2013), he was convicted in 1980 of the murder of the Steyaert family on 23 June 1979, as well as the earlier killing of Polish shopkeeper Hélène Lichachevski.

== Crime ==
On June 23, 1979, Horion and Feneulle raided the home of car dealer Roland Steyaert in Sint-Amandsberg. Roland Steyaert was murdered in his garage, followed by the rest of the family: wife Leona Van Lancker, their 13-year-old daughter Hilde, as well as 22-year-old daughter Anne-Marie and her 24-year-old fiancé Marc De Croock, who came home unexpectedly.

== Conviction and imprisonment ==
The police discovered a connection with an earlier murder case: that of Hélène Lichachevski, a Polish shopkeeper in the port of Ghent who was killed on 9 February 1979 with the same weapon. Two days after the murder of the Steyaert family, Feneulle was arrested, and Horion the following day.

Horion, defended by the young Jef Vermassen, and Feneulle were found guilty of six counts of murder in 1980 by the East Flemish court of assizes and sentenced to death, which was immediately commuted to life imprisonment. After being incarcerated Leuven Central prison and Bruges prison for decades, Horion was transferred to Hasselt Prison in November 2009 at the request of his lawyer.

Feneulle was imprisoned in Bruges prison and died there at the age of 60. Horion would now deny the murder of the East Flemish shopkeeper Lichachevski for which he was convicted, and would put the blame on a friend in a series of letters.

== Escape King ==
Horion was considered an Escape King (Dutch: Ontsnappingskoning), especially during his early years of imprisonment, for his many attempts, most of which however failed, to escape prison in the 1980s and early 1990s.

Horion's first attempt to escape was just months after his arrest in October 1980. Horion, his fellow accomplice Roland Feneulle, and five other inmates used a fake pistol to threaten guards. They successfully made it onto the roof of the De Nieuwe Wandeling prison in Ghent before the attempt failed.

Undoubtedly his most successful escape was breaking out of the high-security Leuven-Central prison, alongside a Dutch inmate, in May 1982. Horion managed to evade a nationwide police manhunt for a month and a half by hiding out in the Netherlands. He was eventually caught in Haarlem during a break-in, and extradited back to Belgium. In October 1987, Horion managed to escape for another six hours. He is also said to have made attempts In 1994 and 1995 he made several attempts again but none were successful.

== Release ==
On 9 May 2023, the European Court of Human Rights ruled that the Belgian government violated Horion's rights due to the fact that he had "no realistic prospect of release" (a violation of article 3 of the European Convention on Human Rights) after being repeatedly denied parole.

On the 2nd of May 2025, VRT reported that Horion had applied for euthanasia. His lawyer stated unbearable psychological suffering as the reason, brought about by his imprisonment and repeated parole denials, given that he had requested multiple times to be transferred to a forensic psychiatric care centre but had always been denied.

In May 2026, the Ghent Sentence Enforcement Court (Dutch: Strafuitvoeringsrechtbank) decided that Horion could leave prison after 47 years of imprisonment and would be placed in a forensic care center (Dutch: forensisch zorgcentrum), where he must strictly follow a dedicated psychiatric treatment program.
