= Physics (band) =

- Origin: San Diego, California, U.S.
- Genres: Instrumental, Math Rock
- Years active: 1993 – 2000
- Past members: John D. Goff; Rob Crow; Denver Lucas; Jeff Coad; John Goff; Will Goff; Jason Soares; Cameron Jones; Travis Nelson

Physics was an instrumental band from San Diego, California, established by John D. Goff and Denver Lucas in late 1993 after the breakup of Johnny Superbad & the Bulletcatchers.

== History ==
Featuring a rotating cast of musicians from the San Diego experimental underground but mainly composed of Denver Lucas on drums, Jeff Coad on synthesizers, John Goff, Will Goff, Jason Soares, Rob Crow, Travis Nelson, Ryan Jencks on guitar and Matt Lorenz on visuals/projections. This early incarnation came to be known as the "Black Period". Mainly inspired by theories in quantum theory and Eastern Mysticism, Physics was musically influenced by Krautrock, minimalism, early Doom/Drone, and Electronic Kosmische, though were often associated with the Math Rock genre. After the untimely death of Denver Lucas in the mid-1990s, the Physics personnel underwent numerous changes until resulting in Cameron Jones on drums which was later known as the "Gray Period" then ultimately the "White Period".

After Physics dissolved in 2000, Jason Soares and Jeff Coad went on to form the more electronic-based Aspects Of Physics also with Matt Lorenz. Will and John Goff went on to form the electronic band SSI. Rob Crow started Pinback (co-led by Zach Smith from Three Mile Pilot).

In 2015, coinciding with the release of the documentary It's Gonna Blow!!! San Diego's Music Underground 1986–1996, Physics reformed for reunion shows in Portland, Oregon and Los Angeles

== Discography ==
- Black 7, (Dagon Productions), 1994
- Physics 1, (Flapping Jet), 1997
- Physics 2, (Gravity), 1998
- 1999-11-21, (Neurot Recordings), 1999
- Live: 2.7.98 (EP), (Gold Standard Laboratories), 2000
