= Blood Axis =

American band

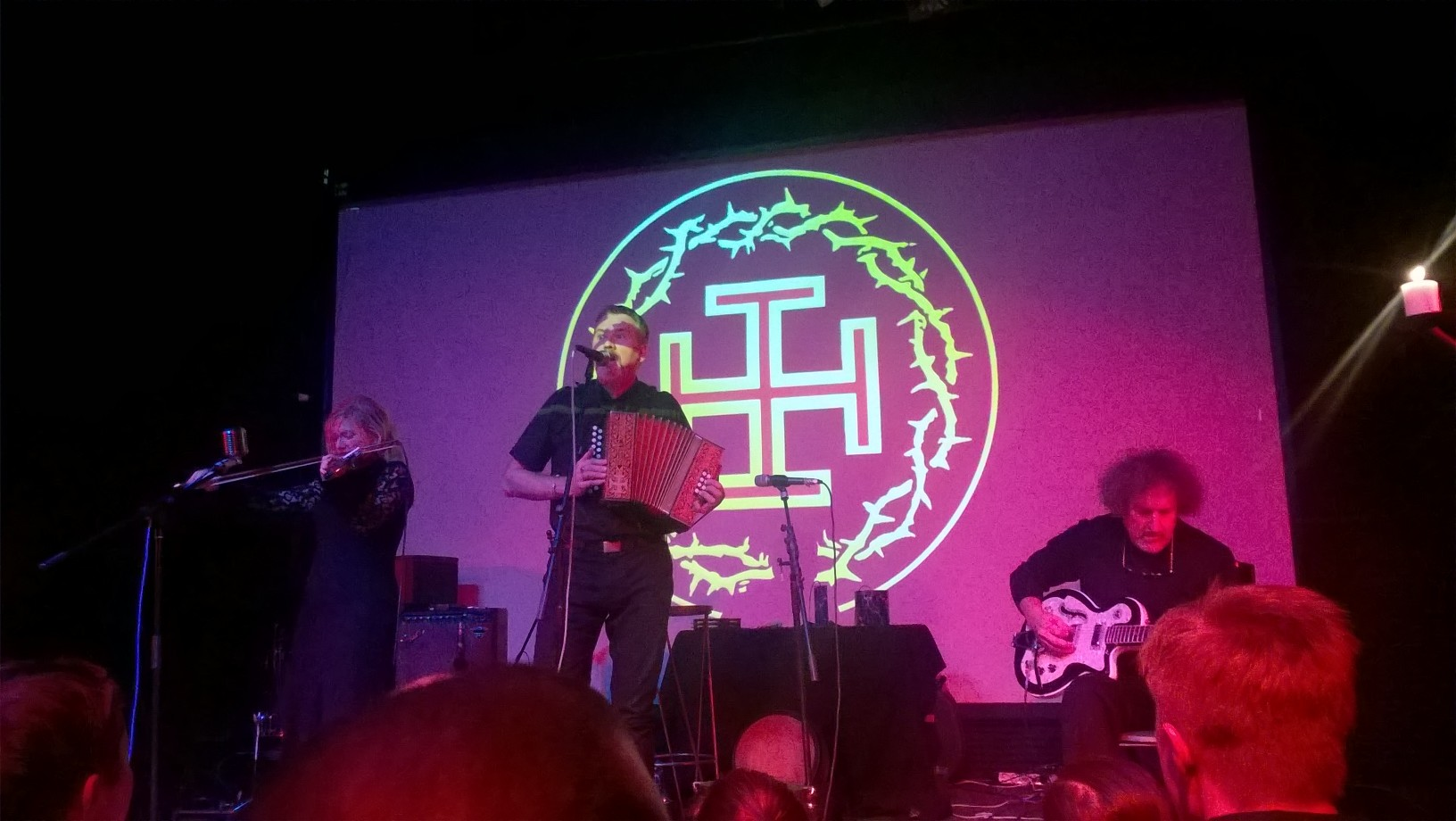
- Blood Axis performing in 2016

Background information
- Origin: United States
- Genres: Experimental; folk; martial industrial; neofolk; neoclassical; post-industrial; spoken word
- Years active: 1989–2016
- Label: Storm
- Members: Michael Moynihan; Robert Ferbrache; Annabel Lee

Blood Axis were an American band, made up of journalist and author Michael Moynihan, music producer Robert Ferbrache, and musician and author Annabel Lee.

== History ==
=== Early period (1989–1999) ===
Moynihan had founded Coup de Grace, a multimedia project that produced live performances and cassettes and also released booklets of images and texts, the last of which was Friedrich Nietzsche's The Antichrist. The first output from the new appellation were two songs, "Lord of Ages" (employing lyrics from Rudyard Kipling's poem on Mithras) and "Electricity", which appeared on a German music sampler. These tracks were well received in Europe and were followed by two more songs that appeared on the compilation, Im Blutfeuer.

In 1995, Moynihan released the first full-length studio LP, The Gospel of Inhumanity with the help of Robert Ferbrache. The album wedded the music of Johann Sebastian Bach and Sergei Prokofiev with modern electronics. Moynihan implemented a recording of Ezra Pound reading from his The Cantos. He also included lyrics from Nietzsche and Longfellow as well as his own to the work.

The band consisted of Michael Moynihan (vocals, bodhrán), Annabelle Lee (melodeon, electric violin), and Robert Ferbrache (guitars, keyboards).

=== Later period (2000–2016) ===
In 2005, Blood Axis played the German Flammenzauber festival, showcasing reworked live versions of several previously released songs, a number of Irish folk songs, and the live debut of a few new songs. April 2006 saw further live activity from Blood Axis, as well as a new medium for the duo's folk-oriented material entitled Knotwork at the Swiss Triumvirat festival.

Beginning in 1998, Moynihan began saying that Blood Axis was at work on a second full-length album, at one time said to be entitled Ultimacy. On 2 January 2009, Blood Axis played in Sintra, Portugal, with members of Portuguese band Sangre Cavallum. Moynihan stated on stage that the new album, now titled Born Again, was to be released the following Easter.

Blood Axis makes references to neopagan and völkisch concepts and figures such as Ludwig Fahrenkrog and Fidus. Moynihan is interested in rune mysticism. Beginning in the 2000s, he was influenced by the neofascist movement Nouvelle Droite and Alain de Benoist.

== Discography ==
=== Albums ===
- The Gospel of Inhumanity, 1995
- Born Again, 2010

=== Collaborations and split releases ===
- Walked in Line, 1995
- The March of Brian Boru, 1998
- Witch-Hunt: The Rites of Samhain, 2001
- Absinthe: La Folie Verte, 2001
- Absinthe: La Folie Verte LP box, 2002
- The Dream / Fröleichen So Well Wir, 2010
