= Tyr (journal) =

American journal

- Cover of volume 1, 2002
- Editor: Michael J. Moynihan and Joshua Buckley
- Categories: Culture
- Frequency: Annual
- First issue: 2002
- Country: United States
- Language: English
- ISSN: 1538-9413
- OCLC: 724001561

Tyr: Myth—Culture—Tradition is an American "radical traditionalist" journal, edited by Michael J. Moynihan and Joshua Buckley, and (in the first issue) Collin Cleary. Articles frequently focused on Germanic neopagan topics, as well as the philosophies of figures like René Guénon and Julius Evola. By 2018, it had 5 issues.

== History ==
Tyr was co-edited by Michael J. Moynihan and Joshua Buckley. Buckley was a former neo-Nazi skinhead, and previously had been a member of a group called SS of America. Moynihan was the author of the book Lords of Chaos and a member of the band Blood Axis.

The first issue was published in 2002 under the ULTRA imprint in Atlanta, Georgia, operated by Buckley. Four volumes, in 2002, 2004, 2006 and 2014, were published by Norway's Integral Publications, one in 2018 by Arcana Europa Media. As of 2024, there were 5 issues total.

== Content ==
A "radical traditionalist" journal, Tyr frequently focuses on Germanic neopaganism and the traditionalist philosophies of figures like René Guénon and Julius Evola. It is named for Tyr, the Germanic god. The magazine states that it "celebrates the traditional myths, culture, and social institutions of pre-Christian, pre-modern Europe."

The magazine advocated ecology and a return to tribal societies, spurning modern civilization in lieu of "small, ethnically and culturally homogenous tribal societies". It stated of its aims that: "[O]ur tradition is [...] the European tradition. We make no apologies for this. Like the bioregionalist, the proponent of European integral culture is interested in 'living in place' in an organized, homogeneous human community." The back of each issue contained a manifesto of radical traditionalism, stating that it aimed for:

resacralization of the world versus materialism; folk/traditional culture versus mass culture; natural social order versus an artificial hierarchy based on wealth; the tribal community versus the nation-state; stewardship of the earth versus ‘maximization of resources’; a harmonious relationship between men and women versus ‘the war between the sexes’; handicrafts and artisanship versus industrial mass production.

Contributors include Asatru Folk Assembly founder Stephen McNallen, Nouvelle Droite leader Alain de Benoist, British musicologist and translator Joscelyn Godwin, modern Germanic mysticist Nigel Pennick and occultist Stephen Flowers. The journal has also published translations of older works, such as by occultist Julius Evola and völkisch poet and musician Hermann Löns.

== Reception and analysis ==
As described by Benjamin R. Teitelbaum, Tyr "contextualized Traditionalism within an implicitly nativistic worldview championing white European ethnicities". Michael Strmiska, writing for the Pagan Studies journal The Pomegranate in 2010 reviewed the first three issues. According to Strmiska, the Tyr was eclectic and "difficult to categorize". Strmiska also addressed the political content of Tyr, specifically saying the journal was not pro-fascist or neo-Nazi. He said there was "much to recommend" about the periodical, though noted "controversial political aspects". A brief 2004 review in Willamette Week of the second issue said that "It's hard not to find the recurrent interest in a posited tribal 'homogeneity' a little discomfiting (indeed, a section of this issue's preface attempts to dismiss 'The Fascist Accusation' before the fact)", and summarized the journal as "a first-class artifact of, ironically, modern Bohemia".

Teitelbaum considered it as functioning more as "a sort of lifestyle magazine for reactionary Traditionalists rather than a political tract". Strmiska wrote that though some of its contributors were academics, many were not, and so in categorizing it considered it "a quasi-academic, intellectually serious journal". Of its political aspects, Strmiska critiqued its "radical traditionalist" worldview, arguing that "in calling not only for a revival of pre-Christian religious traditions but a return to a pre-modern way of life and an ethnically homogeneous, tribal society, the Radical Traditionalist viewpoint would seem to risk rejecting the very diversity of modern—or post-modern—society which made the resurgence of Paganism possible in the first place." He considered it to reject neo-Nazism and neo-fascism, however, with the editors "voic[ing] their unequivocal rejection of Nazism and neo-Nazism, explicitly rejecting the brutal Nazi program of racial eugenics as an example of the very kind of destructive modernity that Radical Traditionalists deplore".
