= Trilogue =

A trilogue is a literary form in which an imagined conversation between three participants is recorded. Extant examples suggest that it is used especially to treat scientific, especially chemical and philosophical, topics.
