= Internet Advisor =

British magazine

Broadband & Internet Advisor (originally Internet Advisor) is a magazine which was founded in 1993. The magazine was published by Future Publishing to provide technical articles, news, and reviews relating to Internet technology. In August 2005, Alex Summersby replaced Dan McNamara as chief editor. In winter of 2005, Future Publishing closed Broadband & Internet Advisor and merged its content with net.
