= Genius (radio series) =

- The cover of Genius Series 1
- Genre: Comedy game show
- Running time: 30 minutes
- Country of origin: United Kingdom
- Language: English
- Home station: BBC Radio 4
- Syndicates: BBC Radio 4 Extra
- TV adaptations: Genius
- Starring: Dave Gorman
- Created by: Ali Crockatt; David Scott
- Produced by: Simon Nicholls
- Original release: 27 October 2005 – 22 December 2008
- No. of series: 3 (plus 1 special)
- No. of episodes: 18
- Audio format: Stereo
- Opening theme: Lobster Bucket! by The Aquabats
- Website: www.bbc.co.uk/programmes/b0072b7p

Genius is a BBC Radio 4 comedy gameshow presented by comedian Dave Gorman. Listeners send in 'genius' ideas which are considered by Gorman and a guest before a studio audience, with a different guest for each show. One series of five episodes was broadcast between 27 October and 24 November 2005, with a second series of six episodes broadcast between 7 September and 12 October 2006 and a third series between 1 October and 5 November 2007. A Christmas special was broadcast on 22 December 2008. An unbroadcast television pilot was made in November 2007, with a full series recorded for BBC Two in September 2008.

The series was created by Ali Crockatt and David Scott, and is produced by Simon Nicholls.

== Rules ==
People send their ideas to Genius and, if chosen, travel to a recording of the show to put forward their idea to the audience. Superficially, the idea must have some quality by which it will improve the standard of living either for the individual or society at large, although in reality, it is more important that the idea has comedic value. An early addition to the rules was that evil genius should count. Most ideas are created by one person, however it is possible for an idea to be made by more than one person. There are normally five different ideas on every episode, but this has been known to differ.

The idea can be anything, such as an invention, a law or a government policy. The idea does not have to be very expensive, or even ethical. Some ideas are constructed or otherwise trialled in real life, and the consequences are played out to their extremes, with the host usually attempting to identify a flaw in each idea. The guest then decides if the idea is "Genius or not".

Once all the ideas have been put forward, the guest then picks his/her two favourites. The winner out of these two is chosen by the audience, by applauding for their choice. The one with the loudest applause wins the "coveted" Genius trophy. Since series two, the winner also reads the end credits.

However, one of the winning ideas at the end of the third series was to change the voting system of the show. A person complained that the second idea had an unfair advantage because they knew how much louder they needed to clap. In the following episode, the Christmas Special, the winning idea was instead decided by the guest judge within a 10-second time limit.

== Series overview ==
Series overview
Series	Episodes	Originally released	
Series	Episodes	First released	Last released
1	5	27 October 2005	24 November 2005
2	6	7 September 2006	12 October 2006
3	6	1 October 2007	5 November 2007
Special		22 December 2008	

== Episodes ==
=== Series 1 (2005) ===
No. overall	No. in series	Celebrity	Original release date
1	1	Paul Daniels	27 October 2005
Cash point common sense questions - Not Genius; Spokey dokies on the Millenium Wheel - Genius; 99p coin - Genius; Houses of Parliament run by the rules of Just a Minute - Genius (Winner) Steel drum urinals - Not Genius
2	2	Richard Madeley	3 November 2005
Mobile phone breathalysers - Genius; Food piped into homes - Not Genius; Pavement safety lanes - Genius; World morality zones - Genius Miniature elephants as pets - Genius (Winner)
3	3	John Fortune	10 November 2005
You're dumped day - Genius; Laughing gas for riot control - Genius; Car passenger fake brake pedal - Not Genius; Right-handed glove for left-handed people - Not Genius Old-aged scientists to Mars - Genius (Winner)
4	4	Neil Innes	17 November 2005
Bunk chair - Genius; Randomised day of week - Not Genius; Boxes of biscuits with no crap ones in - Genius Helium filled Bubble Wrap - Genius (Winner)
5	5	Stewart Lee	24 November 2005
Telephone that lets you hear what the other person is saying after they've hung up - Not Genius; Synchronised car indicators - Genius; Guns that fire puppies - Not Genius; CD player microwave oven - Genius (Winner) Toilet cistern fish tank - Not Genius

=== Series 2 (2006) ===
No. overall	No. in series	Celebrity	Original release date
6	1	Johnny Vegas	7 September 2006
Metal detector dogs - Genius (Winner); Science of functional opposites - Genius; Friendly car horn - Not Genius; Historical town of the future - Genius Concert ticket seating ordered by height - Not Genius
7	2	Carol Vorderman	14 September 2006
Rotating home rooms - Genius; Fizzy Bovril - Not Genius; Flexible pension years - Genius; Parking meter gambling machines - Genius (Winner) Lower sea levels by killing whales - Not Genius
8	3	Brian Sewell	21 September 2006
Anesthetise aeroplane passengers - Genius; White van premium rate 'how's my driving' number - Not Genius; Horse bike - Not Genius; Putting the clocks back an hour every night - Genius (Winner) Brian Sewell should re-record episodes of Thomas the Tank Engine - Not Genius
9	4	Chris Addison	28 September 2006
Weighing scales in shoes - Not Genius; Mark items you like with a UV marker pen - Not Genius; Clairvoyant newsreaders - Genius; Virtual reality headsets for chickens - Genius Socks in trios - Genius (Winner)
10	5	Sid Waddell	5 October 2006
Perforated bread - Genius (Winner); Book of people yawning - Not Genius; Capital punishment lottery - Not Genius; Listening radio (ability to skip annoying adverts) - Genius Fancy dress for couples counselling - Genius
11	6	Armando Iannucci	12 October 2006
Parachutes for aeroplanes - Genius; Anti-social people forced to wear multi-coloured flip-flops - Not Genius; Movie version of Tetris - Genius (Winner); Contrarianism political party - Genius Running shoes with very high soles - Not Genius

=== Series 3 (2007) ===
No. overall	No. in series	Celebrity	Original release date
12	1	Rob Newman	1 October 2007
Old people to monitor CCTV to look for crime - Not Genius; Invent the new swear word 'crathole' - Not Genius; Rename hitchhiking to 'Green thumb travel technology' - Genius (Winner); Expedition to claim the 'East pole' (0°N 90°E) and 'West pole' (0°N 90°W) for Great Britain - Genius Fingernails on brushes to remove stubborn stains - Not Genius
13	2	Germaine Greer	8 October 2007
Inverse alarm clock - Not Genius; Real world mesaurements for areas - Genius; Husbands for Justice - Not Genius; Felons build their own prison cells using Lego - Genius (Winner) New, normalised numbering system - Not Genius
14	3	Simon Munnery	15 October 2007
Bespoke facial razor - Genius; Talking parrots for the mute - Not Genius; Similar people have similar phone numbers - Genius; People pay to work to get fit on allotments - Genius Vacuum loom - Genius (Winner)
15	4	Gyles Brandreth	22 October 2007
Reduce the speed limit by 1mph - Not Genius; Loan out the Royal Family to other countries - Genius (Winner); To avoid awkward party introductions, everyone should be called Bob - Genius; Conveyor belt duvet - Genius Replace collective nouns for animals with the noise they make - Genius
16	5	Matthew Wright	29 October 2007
Shower coat - Genius; Make the Isle of Wight symmetrical - Not Genius; Swap father, the child-swapping scheme - Genius (Winner); Million mile per hour machine - Not Genius National anthems should contain the nation's problems - Not Genius
17	6	Charlie Brooker	5 November 2007
Mobile service stations - Not Genius; The letter C or K replaced by each other, or just removed - Not Genius; Short-lived pets for adults - Genius (Winner declared); Basketball for short people - Not Genius Change the Genius winner voting system - Genius (Winner actual)

=== Christmas Special (2008) ===
No. overall	No. in series	Celebrity	Original release date
18	1	Lee Mack	22 December 2008
Abolish Christmas - Not Genius; Lonely hearts ads on Christmas ready meals for one - Genius (Winner); Parents should deliver Christmas presents to help Santa - Not Genius Go anywhere ice skates - Genius

=== TV series (2009) ===
A television series of Genius was recorded and the first series was broadcast on BBC Two from 20 March 2009. A second series started recording on 23 May 2010 and was broadcast later that year.
