= Dave Gorman's Googlewhack Adventure =

2004 stand-up comedy performance

Dave Gorman's Googlewhack Adventure is a stand-up comedy performance by Dave Gorman which toured between 2003 and 2005. The show follows Gorman's life between his 31st and 32nd birthday: unable to write a novel, Gorman is distracted into travelling the world in search of a "chain" of ten Googlewhacks. A Googlewhack is a pair of words which yield exactly one result on Google, and Gorman's aim is to meet ten people who are owners of the websites which the previous person's Googlewhack leads to. The show uses Gorman's usual style of incorporating charts and maps into a story with a ludicrous premise, and was created to pay back the publishers' advance for his unwritten novel.

Gorman began touring two weeks after the events finished, in March 2003, and he toured Australia, England and the U.S. until 2005. Dave Gorman's Googlewhack Adventure has been received very positively by critics, and received awards at The Comedy Festival and the Nightlife Awards. The show was recorded in 2004 for a DVD release. Gorman wrote a book of the same name about the same events.

== Synopsis ==
This is a description of the 2004 DVD version of the routine, which may differ from other versions of the stage show.

At the turn of his 31st birthday, Gorman decided he wanted to write a novel. He made a deal with Random House, but began to procrastinate whenever he sat down to try to start writing. He received an email telling him that his website contained a Googlewhack—two words which, when searched for on Google, yield only one result. The Googlewhack was "Francophile namesakes", and Gorman began to try other pairs of words in Google to see if any yield exactly one result, finding one that day and beginning email correspondence with the website's owner, a collector of photographs containing women and dogs.

Over the next six months, Gorman remains unable to start writing his novel. He finds three Googlewhacks by testing answer combinations from an Observer cryptic crossword, and meets up with the owner of the aforementioned website, who finds another. Meanwhile, he wins one of the Observer's crossword competitions and gets a £15 book token. The website which it is from is owned by a man named Dave Gorman living in France, who Gorman previously met as part of his stage show Are You Dave Gorman? They meet up again, and Gorman challenges Gorman to make a "chain" of ten Googlewhacks: each link is a Googlewhack discovered by the person who owned the website of the previous Googlewhack. Each person is only allowed to find two Googlewhacks, and Gorman must complete the challenge before his 32nd birthday.

Gorman does not want to accept but he is slowly dragged into completing the challenge. As the third chain in the link, Gorman gives Gorman two Googlewhacks, with the associated websites to contact, and one website owner—a physicist from Washington, D.C.—replies. After a party with his friends on New Year's Eve, he wakes up in Heathrow Airport with a ticket to Washington purchased by him, though he has no memory of it. He flies to Washington and meets the physicist, who finds two Googlewhacks, and one leads him to a man in Boston who finds two more and contacts the owners. Gorman meets up with one of them, Jerry from Columbus, Ohio. He reaches a dead end, so he contacts the owner of a Googlewhack in a previous chain and in a fortnight, gets two chains of four and five travelling between England and the U.S. One chain dies out when he meets Duane Gish, a creationist who cannot be persuaded to find a Googlewhack. The other dies out due to Gorman being unable to contact website owners. Upset at his failure to complete the challenge or write his novel, Gorman gets drunk in Austin, Texas and wakes up with a tattoo of his mock Texan driving license.

In distress, he goes to stay with a friend from Los Angeles. He goes back to a previous link in the chain and travels between America and England to get to six. The seventh link is a man living in China, who finds him two potential eighth links. Gorman pursues one and reaches a chain of nine, but cannot reach either potential tenth links. He pursues the other Googlewhack and again gets to a chain of nine. After mishearing the Googlewhack and travelling the wrong way, he discovers the right target is in Australia. The date is 27 February and his 32nd birthday is on 2 March, so he flies to Sydney immediately after contacting the website owner. The website details the double life of the owner, who keeps his partying at gay clubs with his gay friends separate from his girlfriend and the rest of his life. Gorman receives a reply at 6:30 p.m. on 1 March: "No sorry".

Gorman had run out of money from the publishers' advance and was obliged to repay the money as he had not produced a novel; the publishers were uninterested in him writing a non-fiction book about his travels. A fortnight after failing the challenge, he was in Australia performing stand-up comedy, describing his Googlewhack journey. Over 150 shows in Australia and England, including at the Edinburgh Festival Fringe, he made enough money to pay back the publishers. The publishers' non-fiction arm then contact him and ask him to write a book about the story.

Gorman returns to describing his story. On 2 March, as Gorman is depressed about failing the challenge, a man visits him at his hotel. He is the owner of the tenth Googlewhack, who was unable to meet Gorman the previous day out of fear of having his website exposed to his girlfriend. Gorman had replied to "No sorry" in fury, insulting the man and attacking him for not being open with his girlfriend. The man appreciated the advice, though rejecting it. He notes that the time is 9:30 a.m. local time, but 10:30 p.m. on 1 March in England, and 11:30 p.m. in France. He rings the Dave Gorman in France to let him know he had won.

== Analysis ==
Gorman describes his work as documentary comedy, and Jason Zinoman compares his style to Steve Martin. Armstrong writes The Times that Gorman was a key founder of the "investigative comic" genre. Dave Gorman's Googlewhack Adventure is similar in premise and format to his previous shows Are You Dave Gorman? and Dave Gorman's Important Astrology Experiment, as each show uses graphs and maps. Dave Gorman's Googlewhack Adventure differs in that it is more personal, containing "crises, self-doubt and loneliness". The show has been described by Zinoman as picaresque, and compared by Brandes to Around the World in Eighty Days.

== Tours ==
Gorman began performing the stage show in Australia during March 2003, a fortnight after the events had happened. He started at the Melbourne International Comedy Festival, from where the show moved to the Sydney Opera House and became the biggest-selling show at the Studio Theatre there. Gorman performed at the Edinburgh Festival Fringe in August 2003 before touring around the UK for three months, finishing at the Hammersmith Apollo. In America, he performed at The Comedy Festival in 2004. He then toured Australia and England again and performed at the Canadian Just for Laughs festival in July 2004. A three-month Off-Broadway run led to tours of North America in spring and autumn 2005.

The DVD recording was filmed at the Swansea Grand Theatre and released in November 2004.

== Reception ==
=== Critical reception ===
BBC critic Mark Shenton lists the show as one of five to see at the 2003 Edinburgh Festival Fringe. Shenton describes it as "really inspiring", praising Gorman's "fire and fervour". Shenton calls Gorman "an instinctive storyteller" and writes that the show is "the most consistently surprising, original and deeply worrying show on the fringe". Jason Zinoman of The New York Times gives the show a positive review, lauding Gorman for making "an art form" out of "wasting time on the Internet".

Philip Brandes of Los Angeles Times reviews the show positively, praising Gorman's "impeccable" timing and ability to link the "disparate narrative threads" seamlessly. Brandes describes the show as "a richly varied, delightful and at times surprisingly touching human tapestry". A positive review in The Sydney Morning Herald writes that the show has "increasing hilarity, sometimes verging on the hysterical" and notes that Gorman's "brief explosion of temper timed perfectly mid-show" is "effective because there is more than a kernel of truth".

In a positive review, Steve Bennett of Chortle describes the plot as "full of jaw-dropping real-life twists". Bennett watched an hour-long performance and commented that "reams of potential material is super-compressed", saying the show would be well-suited to a television series. Stephanie Merritt of The Observer gave a positive review, calling it "an oddly brilliant creation", though suggesting that Gorman should start the show at a "lower emotional pitch". Stephen Armstrong of The Times praises the show as a "masterclass" with a "life-enhancing and jovial" tone, though he criticises that there is a "slight sense of déjà vu" from previous shows.

=== Accolades ===
| Year | Award | Category | Result | Ref. |
|---|---|---|---|---|
| 2004 | The Comedy Festival | Best One Person Show | Won | |
| 2005 | Drama Desk Awards | Outstanding Solo Performance | Nominated | |
| 2005 | Nightlife Awards | Unique Comedy Performance | Won | |
