= Language and Computers =

Book series

Language and Computers: Studies in Practical Linguistics (ISSN 0921-5034) is a book series on corpus linguistics and related areas. As studies in linguistics, volumes in the series have, by definition, their foundations in linguistic theory; however, they are not concerned with theory for theory's sake, but always with a definite direct or indirect interest in the possibilities of practical application in the dynamic area where language and computers meet.

The book series was founded in 1988, and is published by Brill.

== Editors ==
- Christian Mair
- Charles F. Meyer

== Volumes ==
Volumes include:

- # 77. English Corpus Linguistics: Variation in Time, Space and Genre. Selected papers from ICAME 32., Edited by Gisle Andersen and Kristin Bech. ISBN 978-90-420-3679-6 E-ISBN 978-94-012-0940-3
- # 76. English Corpus Linguistics: Crossing Paths., Edited by Merja Kytö. ISBN 978-90-420-3518-8 E-ISBN 978-94-012-0793-5
- # 75. Corpus Linguistics and Variation in English.Theory and Description., Edited by Joybrato Mukherjee and Magnus Huber. ISBN 978-90-420-3495-2 E-ISBN 978-94-012-0771-3
- # 74. English Corpus Linguistics: Looking back, Moving forward. Papers from the 30th International Conference on English Language Research on Computerized Corpora (ICAME 30), Lancaster, UK, 27–31 May 2009., Edited by Sebastian Hoffmann, Paul Rayson and Geoffrey Leech. ISBN 978-90-420-3466-2 E-ISBN 978-94-012-0747-8
- #73. Corpus-based Studies in Language Use, Language Learning, and Language Documentation., Edited by John Newman, Harald Baayen and Sally Rice. ISBN 978-90-420-3401-3 E-ISBN 978-94-012-0688-4
- #72. The Progressive in Modern English. A Corpus-Based Study of Grammaticalization and Related Changes., by Svenja Kranich. ISBN 978-90-420-3143-2 E-ISBN 978-90-420-3144-9
- #71. Corpus-linguistic applications. Current studies, new directions, Edited by Stefan Th. Gries, Stefanie Wulff, and Mark Davies.. ISBN 978-90-420-2800-5
- #70. A resource-light approach to morpho-syntactic tagging., by Anna Feldman and Jirka Hana. ISBN 978-90-420-2768-8
- #69. Corpus Linguistics. Refinements and Reassessments., Edited by Antoinette Renouf and Andrew Kehoe. ISBN 978-90-420-2597-4
- #68. Corpora: Pragmatics and Discourse. Papers from the 29th International Conference on English Language Research on Computerized Corpora (ICAME 29). Ascona, Switzerland, 14–18 May 2008., Edited by Andreas H. Jucker, Daniel Schreier and Marianne Hundt. ISBN 978-90-420-2592-9
- #67. Modals and Quasi-modals in English., by Peter Collins. ISBN 978-90-420-2532-5
- #66. Linking up contrastive and learner corpus research., Edited by Gaëtanelle Gilquin, Szilvia Papp and María Belén Díez-Bedmar. ISBN 978-90-420-2446-5
- #64. Language, People, Numbers. Corpus Linguistics and Society., Edited by Andrea Gerbig and Oliver Mason. ISBN 978-90-420-2350-5
- #63. Variation and change in the lexicon. A corpus-based analysis of adjectives in English ending in –ic and –ical. , by Mark Kaunisto. ISBN 978-90-420-2233-1
- #62. Corpus Linguistics 25 Years on., Edited by Roberta Facchinetti. ISBN 978-90-420-2195-2
- #61. Corpora in the Foreign Language Classroom. Selected papers from the Sixth International Conference on Teaching and Language Corpora (TaLC 6), Edited by Encarnación Hidalgo, Luis Quereda and Juan Santana. ISBN 978-90-420-2142-6
- #60. Corpus Linguistics Beyond the Word. Corpus Research from Phrase to Discourse, Edited by Eileen Fitzpatrick. ISBN 978-90-420-2135-8
- #59. Corpus Linguistics and the Web., Edited by Marianne Hundt, Nadja Nesselhauf and Carolin Biewer. ISBN 978-90-420-2128-0
- #58. English mediopassive constructions. A cognitive, corpus-based study of their origin, spread, and current status, by Marianne Hundt. ISBN 978-90-420-2127-3 / ISBN 90-420-2127-6
