= Goodish =

Goodish may refer to:

- Frank Goodish, a wrestler known by his ring name Bruiser Brody
- Kelly Goodish, a character in The Thin Pink Line

== See also ==
- Dave Gorman: Modern Life Is Goodish, a television series
