= Collocation extraction =

Computational technique to find word sequences

Collocation extraction is the task of using a computer to extract collocations automatically from a corpus.

The traditional method of performing collocation extraction is to find a formula based on the statistical quantities of those words to calculate a score associated to every word pairs. Proposed formulas are mutual information, t-test, z test, chi-squared test and likelihood ratio.

Within the area of corpus linguistics, collocation is defined as a sequence of words or terms which co-occur more often than would be expected by chance. 'Crystal clear', 'middle management', 'nuclear family', and 'cosmetic surgery' are examples of collocated pairs of words. Some words are often found together because they make up a compound noun, for example 'riding boots' or 'motor cyclist' or ‘collocation extraction’ its very self.

== See also ==
- Collocational restriction
- Collostructional analysis
- Compound noun, adjective and verb
- Phrasal verb
- Siamese twins (English language)
- Terminology extraction
- n-gram analysis
