= Keyboard suite in D minor (HWV 437) =

Piece by George Frideric Handel

Keyboard suite in D minor (Allemande, Courante, Sarabande, and Gigue)
Performed by Constantin Stephan

The Keyboard suite in D minor (HWV 437) was composed by George Frideric Handel, for solo keyboard (harpsichord), between 1703 and 1706. It is also referred to as Suite de pièces Vol. 2 No. 4. It was first published in 1733.

== Movements ==
The work consists of five movements:

	Type	Grove reference	Händel-Gesellschaft reference	Hallische Händel-Ausgabe reference	Notes
I	Prelude	107	xlviii, 149		The prelude did not appear in the first edition published by John Walsh and was taken from Handel's keyboard suite HWV 428. HWV 561 is another version of the prelude.
II	Allemande	108	ii, 81	iv/5, 29	
III	Courante	109	ii, 82	iv/5, 30	
IV	Sarabande	110	ii, 82	iv/5, 31	The initial sarabande is followed by two variations thereof.
V	Gigue	111	ii, 83	iv/5, 33	

== In popular culture ==
IV. Sarabande
Performed on an organ synthesiser

The Sarabande has been the subject of a number of instrumental arrangements for inclusion in film scores or TV shows. It has also been used as thematic material for original works.

In most of the examples below, only the original Sarabande without Handel's variations was used.

The work was used in an orchestral arrangement by Leonard Rosenman for the Stanley Kubrick period drama film Barry Lyndon (1975).

The work was quoted by Joe Hisaishi in the song "Nausicaä · Requiem" from his score for the Hayao Miyazaki animated film Nausicaä of the Valley of the Wind (1984).

Dutch singer Petra Berger used the work as the musical setting for her song about Mary, Queen of Scots, "Still a Queen (In My End Is My Beginning)", from her album Eternal Woman (2001).

In 2002, an arrangement by John Altman was used in the so-called "Odyssey" commercial for Levi's.

The work was then recycled in the UK TV advert for the tropical drink Lilt.

In 2005, the Sarabande was featured in the It's Always Sunny in Philadelphia season 1 episode "Charlie Got Molested".

Danish DJ Christian Steen Jensen (alias Camena) used the work in his release of a set of Sarabande (2006) variations.

The Dave Gorman British TV comedy series Modern Life is Goodish (2013-2017; 2025) uses the Sarabande and both of its variations to accompany his 'found poem' section in every episode, performed by the Billroth String Quartet/Ensemble.

The Sarabande was featured in the episode "Warp and Weft" (2017; S02E03) of the second season of the ITV period drama TV series Victoria.

An orchestral version of the work was used on the first episode of The ABC Murders (2018), a television mini-series based on the Agatha Christie novel The A.B.C. Murders (1936), starring John Malkovich as Poirot.

Anders plays this Suite in D Minor, Allemande on the piano in the film "Oslo, August 31st"; director Joachim Trier - right before he dies by heroin overdose.

== See also ==
- Keyboard works by George Frideric Handel
