= Googlewhack =

Contest to find a Google Search query that returns a single result

A Googlewhack was a contest to find a Google Search query that returns a single result. A Googlewhack had to consist of two words found in a dictionary and was only considered legitimate if both of the search terms appear in the result. Published Googlewhacks were short-lived since when published to a website, the new number of hits would become at least two: one to the original hit found, and one to the publishing site, unless a screenshot was provided. Googlewhacks generally no longer exist due to changes in Google search indexing.

== History ==
The term googlewhack, coined by Gary Stock, first appeared on the web at UnBlinking on 8 January 2002. Subsequently, Stock created The Whack Stack, at googlewhack.com, to allow the verification and collection of user-submitted Googlewhacks.

Googlewhacks were the basis of British comedian Dave Gorman's comedy tour Dave Gorman's Googlewhack Adventure and book of the same name. In these, Gorman tells the true story of how, while attempting to write a novel for his publisher, he became obsessed with Googlewhacks and travelled across the world finding people who had authored them. Although he never completed his original novel, Dave Gorman's Googlewhack Adventure went on to be a Sunday Times No. 1 best seller in the UK.

Participants at Googlewhack.com discovered the sporadic "cleaner girl" bug in Google's search algorithm where "results 1–1 of thousands" were returned for two relatively common words such as Anxiousness Scheduler or Italianate Tablesides.

Googlewhack went offline in November 2009 after Google stopped providing definition links. Gary Stock stated on the game's web page soon afterward that he was pursuing solutions for Googlewhack to remain viable.

=== Score ===
Some people propose the googlewhack "score", which is the product of the hits of the individual words. Thus a googlewhack score is highest when the individual words produce a large number of hits.

=== Examples ===
- comparative unicyclist
- maladroit wheezer

== Variations ==
New Scientist has discussed the idea of a Googlewhackblatt, which is similar to a Googlewhack except that it involves finding a single word that produces only one Google result. Lists of these have become available, but as with Googlewhacks, they result in the Googlewhackblatt status of the word being destroyed—unless it is blocked by robots.txt or the word does not produce any Google results before it is added to the list, thus forming the Googlewhackblatt Paradox. Those words that do not produce any Google search results at all are known as Antegooglewhackblatts before they are listed—and subsequently elevated to Googlewhackblatt status if it is not blocked by robots.txt.

Feedback stories are also available on the New Scientist website, thus resulting in the destruction of any existing Googlewhackblatts that are ever printed in the magazine. Antegooglewhackblatts that are posted on the Feedback website become known as Feedbackgooglewhackblatts as their Googlewhackblatt status is created. In addition, New Scientist has more recently discovered another way to obtain a Googlewhackblatt without falling into the Googlewhackblatt Paradox. One can write the Googlewhackblatt on a website, but backward, and then search on elgooG to view the list properly while still keeping the Googlewhackblatt's status as a Googlewhackblatt.

In contrast to Googlewhacks, many Googlewhackblatts and Antegooglewhackblatts are nonsense words or uncommon misspellings that are not in dictionaries and probably never will be.

Practical use of specially constructed Googlewhackblatts was proposed by Leslie Lamport (although he did not use the term).

== Research applications ==
The probabilities of internet search result values for multi-word queries was studied in 2008 with the help of Googlewhacks. Based on data from 351 Googlewhacks from the "WhackStack", a list of previously documented Googlewhacks, the Heaps' law $\beta$ coefficient for the indexed World Wide Web (about 8 billion pages in 2008) was measured to be $\beta=0.52$. This result is in line with previous studies which used under 20,000 pages. The googlewhacks were a key in calibrating the model so that it could be extended automatically to analyse the relatedness of word pairs.

== See also ==
- Googlefight
- Hapax legomenon
- Statistically improbable phrase – finds phrases in Amazon books unlikely to appear in any other book indexed
