= Are You Dave Gorman? =

British comedy stage show and book

- Author: Dave Gorman and Danny Wallace
- Language: English
- Genre: documentary comedy
- Publisher: Ebury Press
- Publication place: United Kingdom
- Media type: Novel, stage show, television show
- ISBN: 978-0-09-188471-0
- OCLC: 49594425
- Followed by: Dave Gorman's Googlewhack Adventure

Are You Dave Gorman? is the title of a stage show by the British documentary comedian Dave Gorman and the book of the same name, co-written by Gorman and Danny Wallace. The BBC television series The Dave Gorman Collection—Gorman's first television show—was based on the show. The original show was created for the 2000 Edinburgh Festival Fringe. It was nominated for a Perrier award. An extended version of the show was taken to the West End, then to the Melbourne International Comedy Festival (where it was nominated for a Barry Award), the HBO US Comedy Arts Festival in Aspen, Colorado (where it won the Jury Award for Best One Person Show) and finally to New York where it ran for more than three months and was named Best Comedy Show of 2001 by Time Out New York.

== Evolution ==
The show originated from a drunken bet between Dave Gorman and his flatmate Danny Wallace. The bet was thus: Gorman claimed that he shared the name "Dave Gorman" with the assistant manager of East Fife F.C. and that there must be "loads" of others around. Wallace disagreed with him. So the two travelled to Methil (about 450 miles from London), with a Polaroid camera, to meet the assistant manager, whose name was indeed Dave Gorman. More trips followed, to meet more Dave Gormans. During a trip to New York, Gorman applied somewhat arbitrary criteria to exclude one man from the list on the grounds that a metal plaque outside his offices showed his name as "B. David Gorman" (his justification for this—given on his web forum—was "You've got to have rules"). He did, however, count meeting an actor who had once played a character called David Gorman.

Initially, the bet was fairly vague, but on the way to meet Dave Gormans numbers four and five, they debated what "loads" meant. Wallace decided on one for every card in a standard deck, including the two jokers (54). They tried to keep the average distance between Dave Gormans within roughly 300–500 miles (480–800 km), to show that the name was very common, but not too common.

== Stage show ==
To aid the search, Gorman created a stage-show about their travels that was also used to appeal for further Dave Gormans to come forward. The show was called Are You Dave Gorman? This acquired something of a cult following and several people helped Dave in his quest, which he did eventually complete. Five even changed their names by deed poll to Dave Gorman—two of them women.

== Television show ==
Are You Dave Gorman?
- Also known as: The Dave Gorman Collection
- Created by: Dave Gorman and Danny Wallace
- Starring: Dave Gorman
- Opening theme: Eliza Carthy
- Country of origin: United Kingdom
- No. of episodes: 6

Production
- Executive producer: Myfanwy Moore
- Running time: 30mins

Original release
- Network: BBC Two
- Release: 4 March – 8 April 2001

Related
- How to Start Your Own Country

All this came to the attention of the BBC, who gave Gorman a series, co-written and co-produced by Wallace. For copyright reasons, the title was changed to The Dave Gorman Collection. The show was effectively the same as the stage show, and took the form of televised lectures, in which he explained what he had done. The six episodes were directed by Pati Marr. Later, after the TV series was broadcast, a book entitled Are You Dave Gorman? was written by Gorman and Wallace.

Once the TV show existed, Gorman stopped touring the show in the UK, instead taking it to several overseas festivals and later running the show for three months off-Broadway—a run which saw him appearing as a guest on the Late Show with David Letterman.

Two Australian soap operas have named fictional characters Dave Gorman as an in-joke and the comedian has been bombarded with so many e-mails about it that he has had to publicly appeal to people to stop sending him details of other Dave Gormans.

The show was released on DVD on 19 February 2007 under the title Are You Dave Gorman?. It is, however, only available to buy from his website and on Recordstore.

== See also ==
- Josh fight
- Brady Feigl
- The Paul O'Sullivan Band
- Satō–Suzuki Baseball Match
