= Googlefight =

Website

Original version of Googlefight showing comparison for Keep vs Delete

Googlefight was a website that output a comparison of the number of search results returned by Google for two queries, presented as the result of a fight. It was a project of Abondance, the company of Olivier Andrieu.

As of 2026 the website googlefight.com can still be opened but any activity results in a "File not found" message.

== History and description ==
Googlefight was developed by Andrieu with two friends in 2002. The results of comparing two Google searches are presented as a bar graph using animated HTML segments, presented as the outcome of a fight. Historically the results were displayed graphically in a mixed Flash and JavaScript animation, with two animated stick figures fighting on screen after the queries are entered and before an animated bar graph appeared showing the results. The stick figure animation had no impact on the results.

Between 15 and 27 June 2015, the website was updated to a new version, designed by Andrieu, which the About page stated was powered by Semrush and took into account Google search volume as well as the number of results returned.

The site also expanded in 2015 from French and English versions to 11 geographic versions, including German, Italian, Spanish, and Belgian.

== Uses ==
The site is used for entertainment, for example comparing Microsoft and Google, with Google the winner. The results may be comforting, funny or self-referential. It has been used to check spellings. It can also be used as a measure of competitiveness; Salam Pax posted a Googlefight result between himself and Raed Jarrar on their blog in 2002, as their worldwide readership rose in the prelude to the 2003 invasion of Iraq.

Googlefight has been highlighted as an example of a site making money from contextual advertising, as well as one that derives its longevity from community participation (in this case, the always changing search terms).

== See also ==
- Googlewhack
- Google Books Ngram Viewer
- Google Trends
