= Bumper sticker =

Sticker placed on the back of a car

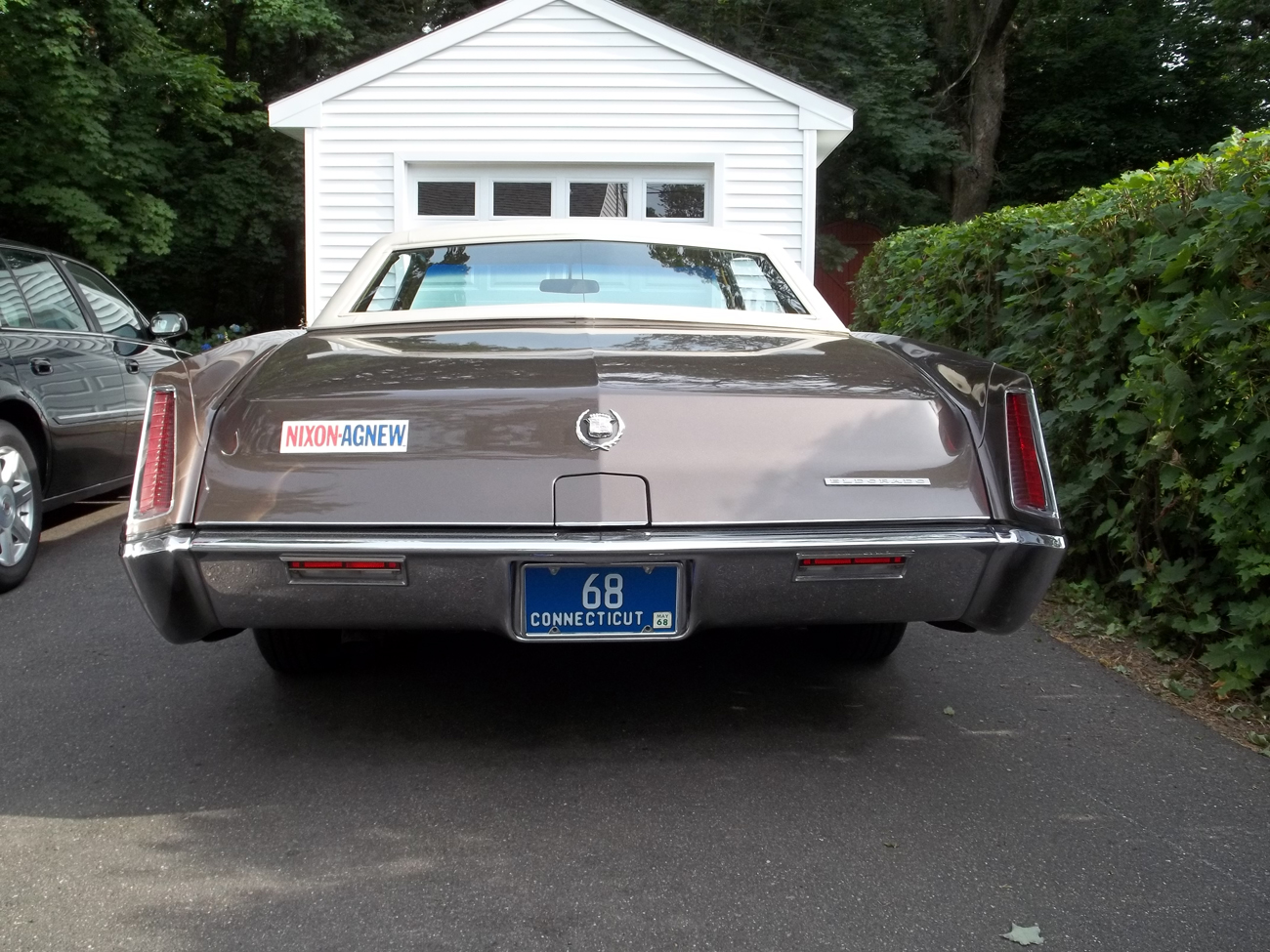
Cadillac Eldorado displaying a 1968 Nixon-Agnew bumper sticker

A bumper sticker is an adhesive label or sticker designed to be attached to the rear of a car or truck, often on the bumper. They are commonly about 10 by 3 in (25.4 by 7.6 cm) and made of PVC.

Bumper stickers serve various purposes, including personal expression, promotion, humor, or political activism. They encompass commercial, religious, secular, military, and sports-related themes, allowing individuals to showcase affiliations or support for various causes, regions, or groups. While they are widely used in the United States to display political support during elections, their prevalence is comparatively lower in countries like the United Kingdom.

Before the emergence of bumper stickers, advertising took various forms, including horsefly nets, metal or cardboard bumper signs, and window shield decals. The advancement of fluorescent inks during World War II and the accessibility of pressure-sensitive and adhesive materials in the post-war period played a significant role in the development and widespread adoption of bumper stickers.

== Purpose ==
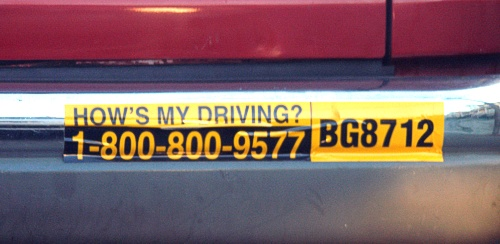
"How's my driving" bumper stickers are often used on commercial vehicles so that employers can receive feedback about the driving habits of their employees.

Bumper stickers can be commercial, religious, secular, humorous, or in support of a sports team or other organization. They may promote or oppose a particular philosophical or political position. Or they may go a different route and show a funny cartoon or punchline. In some countries, such as the United States, bumper stickers are a popular way of showing support for a candidate for a government seat and become more common during election years. In others, such as the United Kingdom, they are rarely seen in any form.

One variety of bumper stickers is the country tag. This is typically used for cars crossing international borders, and is overseen by the United Nations as the Distinguishing Signs of Vehicles in International Traffic, being authorized by the UN's Geneva Convention on Road Traffic (1949) and Vienna Convention on Road Traffic (1968). Often the country code is displayed on the license plate itself.

These have (usually in the United States) been appropriated into tags indicating a country with which the driver affiliates, or more humorously to indicate things like a region (OBX), support for rabbit rescue groups (BUN), etc.

People who opt to exhibit their individuality through these decals may take part in more acts of road rage. Colorado State University social psychologist William Szlemko found that aggressive driving is linked to the number of markers a person has on their car, regardless of the messages portrayed.

== Application and removal ==
Early bumper stickers had printed directions on the back removable liner for applying them to the bumper of a car. Due to the movement of the vehicle and changing weather conditions, the sticker needed to adhere well to the bumper surface.

There are some "easy to remove" bumper stickers and magnetic bumper stickers. Bumper stickers can be removed with a razor blade, penetrating oil or a heat gun. Home remedies also include using common household items, such as WD-40 or paint thinner.

== History ==
Before bumper stickers, advertisers used other methods of displaying their wares. In the horse-drawn carriage era, advertisers printed on horsefly nets with the name of a business. In the 1930s and 1940s, bumper signs were printed on metal or cardboard and wired to the chrome bumpers. Lester Dill, promoter of Meramec Caverns in Missouri, was an ardent adopter of the bumper sign to attract motorists to his site. Using a windowshield decal was another option. These paper strips could be wetted and placed inside a car window. However, these strips did not hold up well when placed on a bumper.

Various factors contributed to the development of the bumper sticker. Developments in material manufacturing during World War II led to the widespread use of daylight fluorescent inks, which were invented by Bob Switzer and his brother Joe. These inks appeared to glow during the daytime and were useful to support various wartime activities; they were favored by early bumper sticker manufacturers after the war. In addition, the first commercially produced pressure-sensitive stickers appeared after World War II; new developments in adhesive materials led to the production of paper strips with adhesive on the back. In addition, increased use of vinyl by the general public after World War II led to the eventual use of this material in bumper stickers.

Many experts credit Forest P. Gill, a silkscreen printer from Kansas City, USA, as the developer of the bumper sticker. Gill recognized that the self-adhesive paper used during the second world war could be used to advertise promotional products in the late 1940s and beyond.

Early widespread uses of the advertising bumper sticker were for tourist attractions, such as Marine Gardens, Florida, Seven Falls, Colorado, Meramec Caverns in Missouri, and Lookout Mountain, Tennessee. Another popular advertisement was the "See Rock City" sticker. In the 1940s and 1950s, visitors to the site had a sticker applied to their car, which duplicated the famous signs painted on the roofs of barns throughout the southeastern USA. Tourist attraction staff would circulate through the parking lot, applying the promotional sticker to every car.

The first documented presidential election that used adhesive bumper stickers in political campaigns was the 1952 election between Dwight D. Eisenhower and Adlai Stevenson II. Bumper stickers allowed citizens to show support for a candidate while still maintaining some anonymity.

Bumper stickers have caused legal issues between people and states. In 1989, a man with a bumper sticker containing indecent wording was convicted. The man's conviction was reversed in Cunningham v. State (1991). The court referenced the First Amendment, stating "the provision regulating profane words on bumper stickers reaches a substantial amount of constitutionally protected speech and unconstitutionally restricts freedom of expression".

== Around the world ==
For instance, in Sweden, rear windows are the normal place to put them; bumper stickers are referred to as "bakrutedekal" in Swedish, meaning "rear window decal".

More recently, bumper stickers have become a route for advertising and a few companies offer to match car owners to advertisers willing to pay for the ad.

== Gallery ==
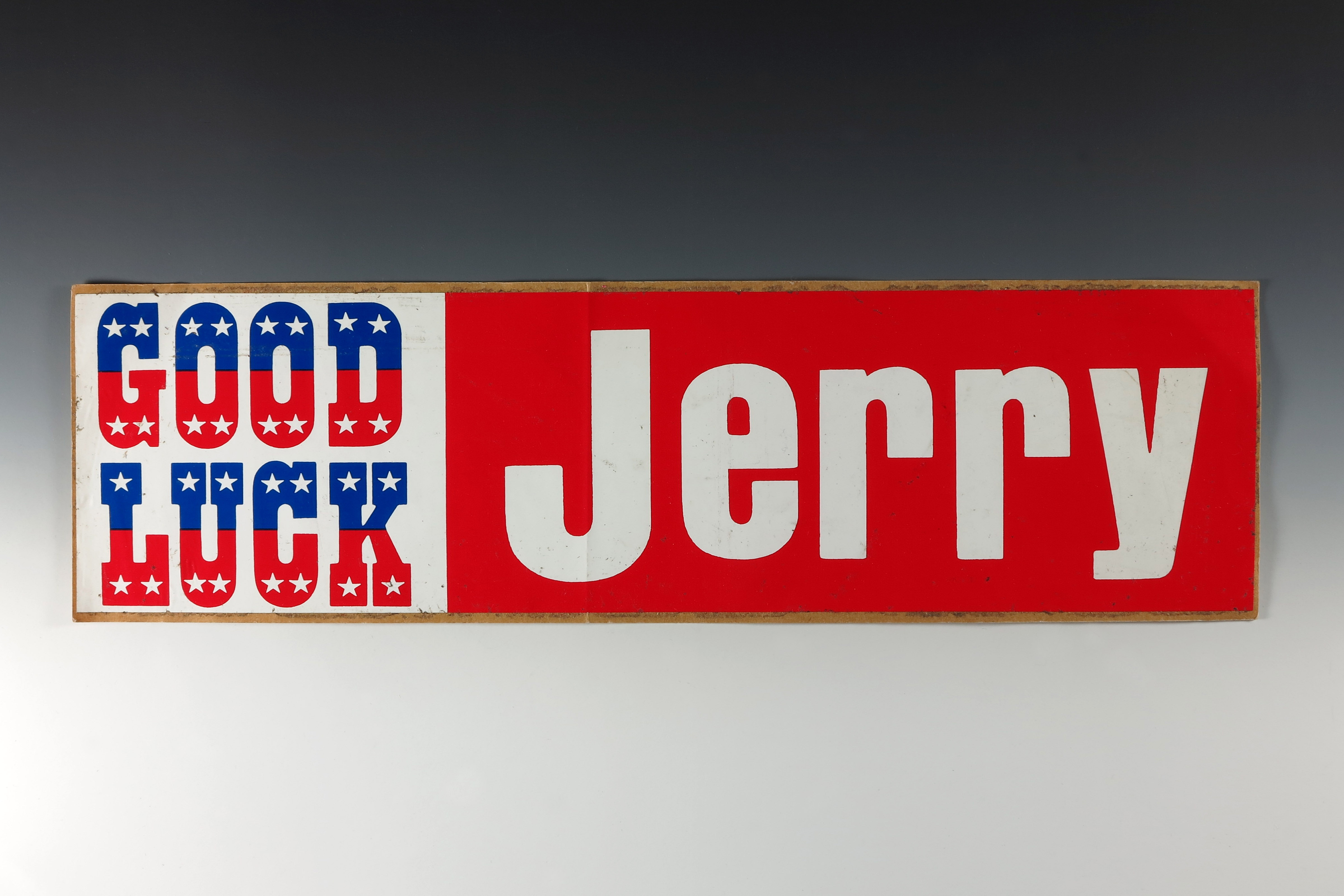
Bumper sticker supporting the 1976 Gerald Ford presidential campaign.

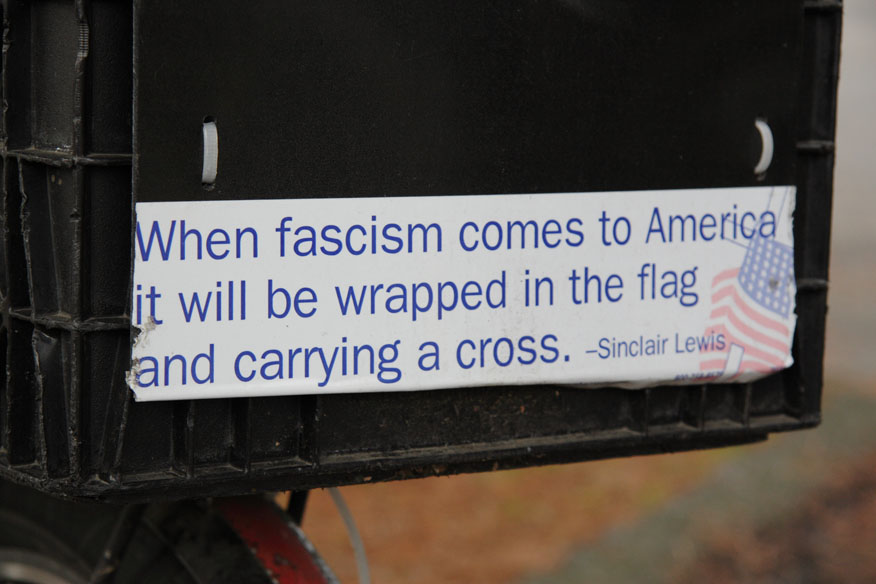
Bumper sticker with a Sinclair Lewis quote on a bicycle

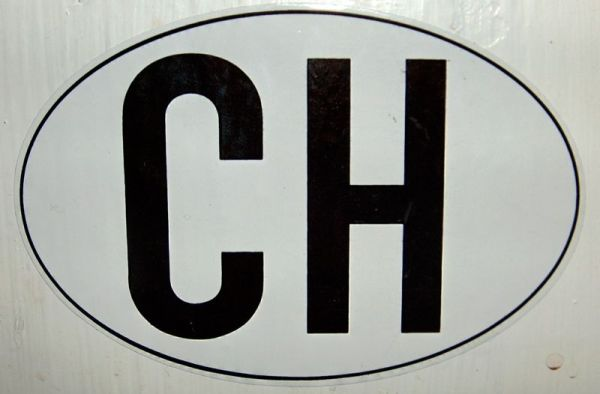
Country tag for Switzerland.

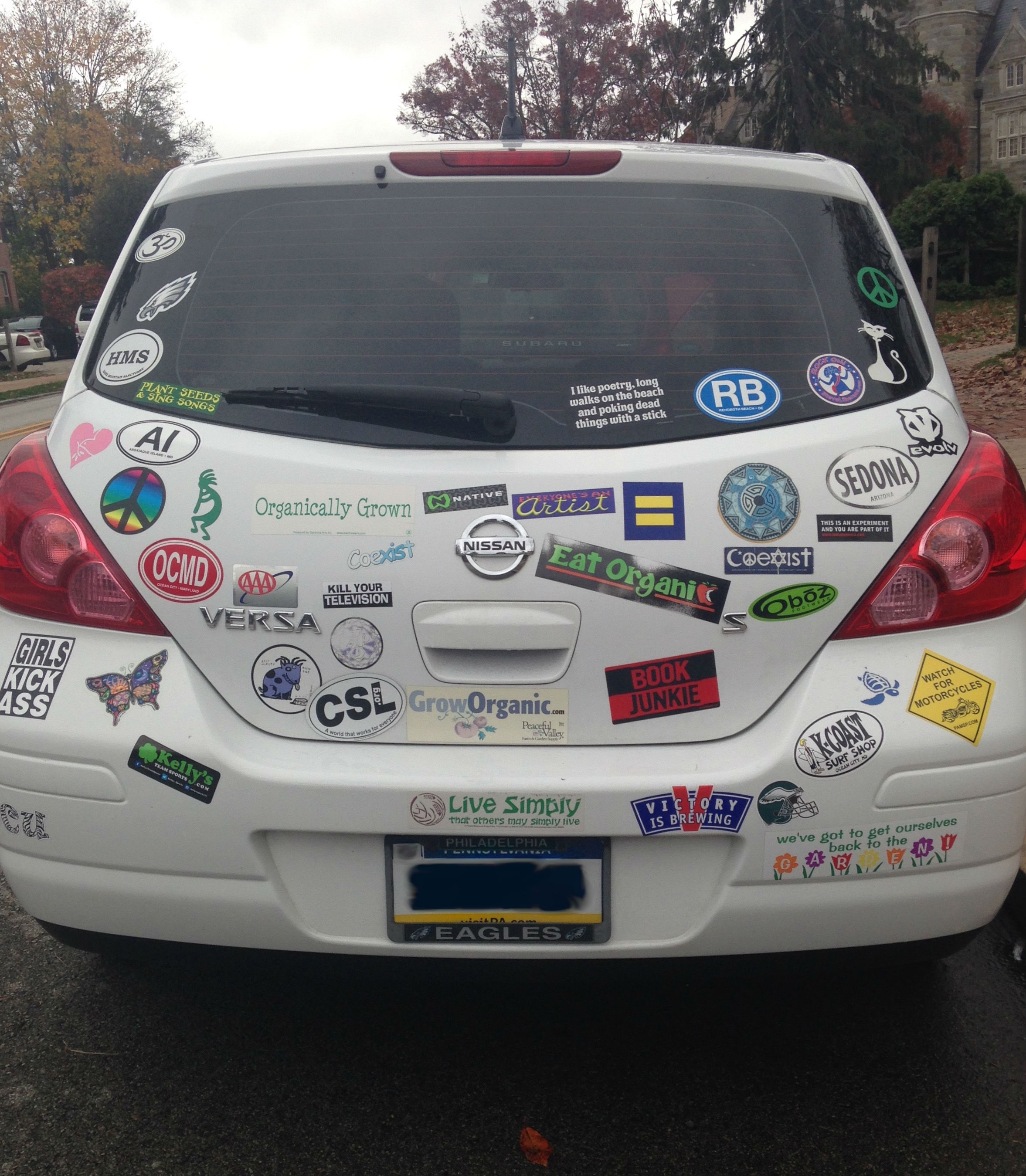
The rear of a Nissan Versa displaying many bumper stickers.

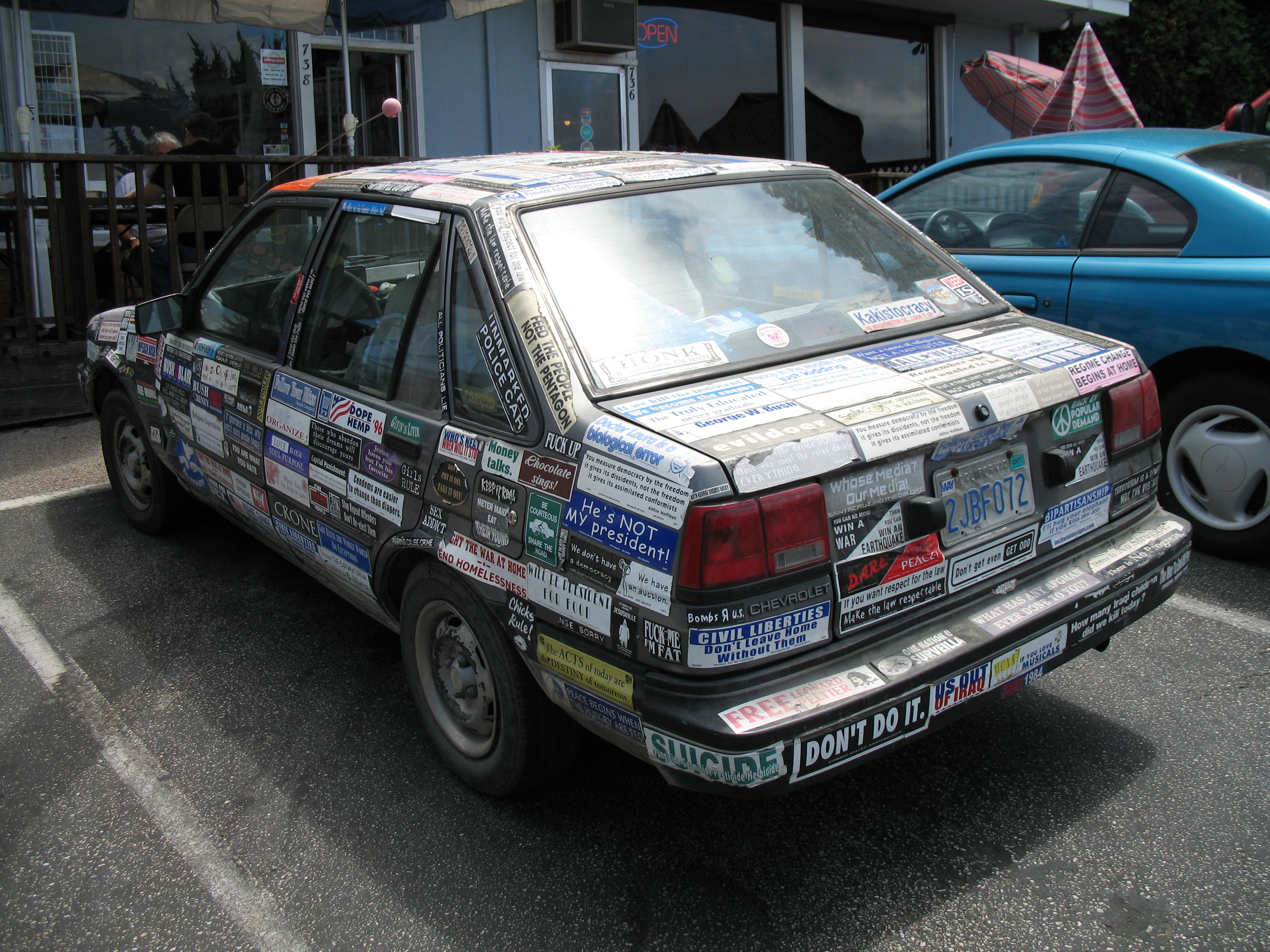
A Chevrolet Nova plastered all over with bumper stickers

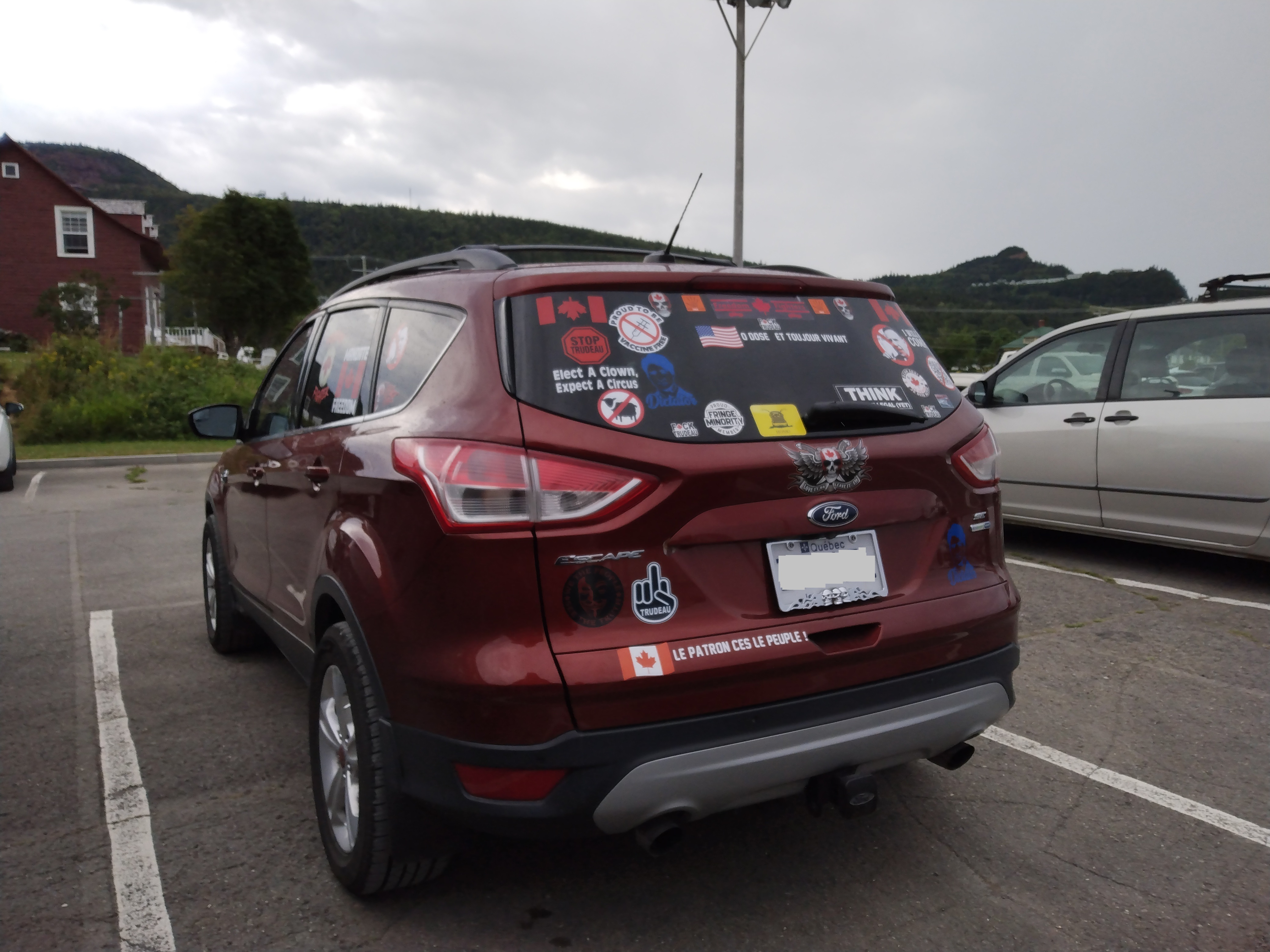
A Ford Escape with bumper stickers.

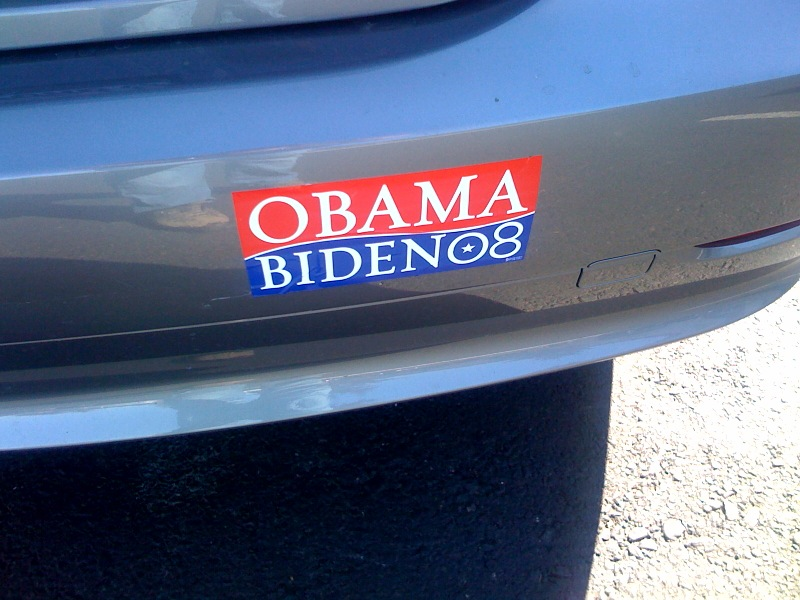
Bumper sticker supporting the 2008 Obama-Biden presidential campaign.

== See also ==
- Country tag
