= Statistically improbable phrase =

Phrase that appears more often in a single work than in a large sample size

A statistically improbable phrase (SIP) is a phrase or set of words that occurs more frequently in a document (or collection of documents) than in some larger corpus. Amazon.com uses this concept in determining keywords for a given book or chapter, since keywords of a book or chapter are likely to appear disproportionately within that section. Christian Rudder has also used this concept with data from online dating profiles and Twitter posts to determine the phrases most characteristic of a given race or gender in his book Dataclysm. SIPs with a linguistic density of two or three words—for example adjective, adjective, noun, or adverb, adverb, verb—will signal the author's attitude, premise or conclusions to the reader or express an important idea.

Another use of SIPs is as a detection tool for plagiarism. (Almost) unique combinations of words can be searched for online, and if they have appeared in a published text, the search will identify where. This method only checks those texts that have been published and that have been digitized online.

For example, a submission by a student that contained the phrase "garden style, praising irregularity in design", might be searched for using Google.com and will yield the original Wikipedia article about Sir William Temple, English political figure and essayist.

== Example ==
While common words such as "the" appear frequently in most texts, a phrase such as "explicit Boolean algorithm" might occur much more often in a document about computers than it does in general English. Therefore, "explicit Boolean algorithm" would be considered a statistically improbable phrase in that context.

Some statistically improbable phrases of Darwin's On the Origin of Species could be: genera descended, transitional gradations, unknown progenitor, fossiliferous formations, closely allied forms, profitable variations, transitional grades, very distinct species and mongrel offspring.

== See also ==
- Collocation – Any series of words that co-occur more often than would be expected by chance
- Googlewhack – A pair of words occurring on a single webpage, as indexed by Google
- tf-idf – A statistic used in information retrieval and text mining
- Complex specified information – a concept used to argue for the "intelligent design" theory
- Hapax legomenon - a word or phrase occurring only once in a language or corpus
