= Collostructional analysis =

Grammatical analysis method family

Collostructional analysis is a family of methods developed by (in alphabetical order) Stefan Th. Gries (University of California, Santa Barbara) and Anatol Stefanowitsch (Free University of Berlin). Collostructional analysis aims at measuring the degree of attraction or repulsion that words exhibit to constructions, where the notion of construction has so far been that of Goldberg's construction grammar.

== Collostructional methods ==
Collostructional analysis so far comprises three different methods:

- collexeme analysis, to measure the degree of attraction/repulsion of a lemma to a slot in one particular construction;
- distinctive collexeme analysis, to measure the preference of a lemma to one particular construction over another, functionally similar construction; multiple distinctive collexeme analysis extends this approach to more than two alternative constructions;
- covarying collexeme analysis, to measure the degree of attraction of lemmas in one slot of a construction to lemmas in another slot of the same construction.

== Input frequencies ==
Collostructional analysis requires frequencies of words and constructions and is similar to a wide variety of collocation statistics. It differs from raw frequency counts by providing not only observed co-occurrence frequencies of words and constructions, but also

(i) a comparison of the observed frequency to the one expected by chance; thus, collostructional analysis can distinguish attraction and repulsion of words and constructions;

(ii) a measure of the strength of the attraction or repulsion; this is usually the log-transformed p-value of a Fisher-Yates exact test.

== Versus other collocation statistics ==
Collostructional analysis differs from most collocation statistics such that

(i) it measures not the association of words to words, but of words to syntactic patterns or constructions; thus, it takes syntactic structure more seriously than most collocation-based analyses;

(ii) it has so far only used the most precise statistics, namely the Fisher-Yates exact test based on the hypergeometric distribution; thus, unlike t-scores, z-scores, chi-square tests etc., the analysis is not based on, and does not violate, any distributional assumptions.

== See also ==
- Collocation extraction
