= Genius (British TV series) =

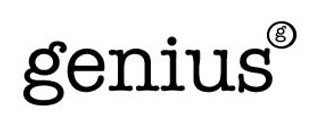
- Created by: Ali Crockatt; David Scott
- Directed by: John L. Spencer
- Presented by: Dave Gorman
- Theme music composer: Misty's Big Adventure
- Country of origin: United Kingdom
- Original language: English
- No. of series: 2
- No. of episodes: 12 (and 1 unaired pilot) (list of episodes)

Production
- Producers: Simon Nicholls; Ali Bryer Carron
- Running time: 30 minutes
- Production company: BBC

Original release
- Network: BBC Two
- Release: 20 March 2009 – 31 October 2010

Related
- Genius (radio series)

Genius is a comedy game show on BBC Two, adapted from the original radio series hosted by the comedian Dave Gorman. On Genius, members of the public submit a range of unusual ideas and inventions for Gorman and guest celebrity judges to decide whether the idea is "Genius". The first series began airing on 20 March 2009, following the success of an unaired pilot.

A second series started filming in May 2010, with quite a few changes to the format. Six episodes were recorded and began broadcasting on 27 September 2010. Genius was axed after the 2nd series by the BBC. When asked on Twitter if it was coming back Dave Gorman said, "Afraid not". There are currently no plans to bring the show back.

== Format ==
Genius involves various members of the public suggesting their ideas for strange and unusual inventions and schemes. Ideas include fitting a second hood to coats in order to protect dates from the rain, comb-unders for men who cannot grow beards, and increasing tourism to the Isle of Wight by making it symmetrical.

The format was changed significantly between the two series

=== Series 1 ===
The potential "genius" delivers their idea from a podium while Gorman and his guest talk about the merits of the plan, performing some experiments concerning the idea. The celebrity judge then decides whether the idea is "Genius or not", which is done by pressing one of two buttons. If the player is declared a genius, the judge pushes the white button and the stage revolves clockwise, where the player enters a white door and is declared "Genius". If the player is not a genius, the judge pressed the red button and the stage revolves anticlockwise, where the player enters a red door and is declared "Not a genius". When all of the ideas have been heard, the judge is then given 10 seconds to decide which of the genius ideas is the most genius. The creator of the winning idea is awarded with the Genius Trophy.

In the middle of the show, Gorman and the judge also read out a selection of rejected ideas, to give an idea of the kind of ideas Genius receives.

=== Series 2 ===
Series two changed the format such that a greater number of ideas could be considered within the programme. For each episode, a number of potential "geniuses" sit in the front rows of the studio audience and during the course of the show a number are called upon by Gorman and two or three celebrity guests to share their ideas. Whilst ideas are declared "genius" or "not genius" by the panel, there are no "winners" or trophy as in season one.

== Production ==
The television version of Genius is an adaptation of the original radio version created by Ali Crockatt and David Scott, and produced by Simon Nicholls. The set for the first series was designed with a rotating stage on which the contestants enter and leave the studio – a reference to the game show Blankety Blank.

== Reception ==
Genius received mixed reviews when it was first broadcast. Sam Wollaston for The Guardian wrote that, "it just about gets away with it – I'm going to give it another go, anyway. And that's because some of these guys' (they are all blokes, and probably always will be) ideas are actually pretty funny."

Anna Lowman from TV Scoop also commented on the show saying: "This isn't groundbreaking TV - if anything it felt slightly '90s in its Room 101-ness - and the unnecessarily huge studio gave a strange atmosphere to proceedings at times. But it is a big-hearted, fun celebration of oddness which is no bad thing. And I've a feeling that the bit where they read 'rejected' ideas might become a highlight of each episode."

Aidan Smith from Scotland on Sunday was more critical. He wrote that: "The show may have had charm on radio but now it's transferred to the box with Dave Gorman hosting, you can obviously see the would-be genii and they just look mad. Madder still, though, is the set designer who went to the trouble of creating the revolving stage complete with dry ice – and in the first edition, a model of a 100m running track to illustrate how lazy people would line up in running shoes 98.2 metres high and forward-flop over the finish line. Give me Sunday night telly over Friday post-pub bilge like this."

Caitlin Moran from The Times was one of the most damning. She described the show as: "like a light entertainment Wounded Knee, but with a studio audience", and she also compared it negatively to another comedy that had begun earlier in the week, Stewart Lee's Comedy Vehicle, saying: "The BBC amazes me. It takes four years for Stewart Lee – a comedian with 17 years' experience – to get a six-part series; yet in Genius wholly inexperienced members of the public are expected to deliver five minutes of broadcast-quality improvised material at the drop of a hat. What, literally, is that all about?"

When the first episode was broadcast, it was watched by 1.67 million viewers, or 8.9% of the total viewing audience.

== Episodes ==
=== Series 1 (2009) ===
No. overall	No. in series	Guest judge	Original release date
1	1	Catherine Tate	20 March 2009
1) The two hooded coat: For protecting your date from the rain. – Winning Genius 2) The democratic bus: The passengers get to say where the bus goes. – Not a Genius 3) Taxi driver: Paul Kalli taking shoes as insurance. – Genius 4) 100-metre-high running shoes: To make sprint racing easier. – Genius
2	2	Frank Skinner	27 March 2009
1) The bespoke multi-bladed razor head mould: to make shaving quicker. – Not a Genius 2) Placing prisoners on exercise bikes attached to the national power grid. – Winning Genius 3) The science of opposites: Discovering the opposite of an item by examining its function – Not a Genius 4) Dancing maths teachers: To encourage greater numbers to study maths. – Genius
3	3	Jonathan Pryce	3 April 2009
1) Build weighing scales into shoes so you can watch your weight on the go. – Genius 2) Adopt appropriate regional accents for weather forecasts so you know which part to listen to. – Genius 3) Make the Isle of Wight symmetrical to increase tourism. – Winning Genius 4) A-bear-toir: Places where naughty children go to have their teddy bears destroyed. – Not a Genius
4	4	Johnny Vegas	17 April 2009
1) Dating insurance: Pay a pound per week, and the person who is dumped gets all of the money. – Not a Genius 2) The torture box: To punish inanimate items. – Winning Genius 3) Zip-up animal suits: An animal wears the suit, and when it dies you put another animal inside, but it looks the same. – Genius 4) The conveyer duvet: A duvet cover which surrounds the bed, so that if you pull it towards you, whoever is sleeping with you still has the duvet covering them. – Not a Genius
5	5	Germaine Greer	24 April 2009
1) Gambling ATM Machines: A gambling machine built into all cash points so when you need a £10 you can try and win it even if you only have a few pounds in your account. – Not a Genius 2) Only Women Voting : Because of the 80 year difference in men being able to vote and women, we should spend the next 61 years with only women voting – Winning Genius 3) Fizzy Onion Juice : Red or White? Carbonated juice of an onion as a summer time drink. Good with cheese, and vodka. Well we do it with lemons! – Not a Genius 4) Day of the Week Lotto : An international lottery program where the order of the days of the week are chosen at random. Bonus ball on leap years, and a rollover for unclaimed Tuesdays. – Genius 5) Cat Bars : As men have bars filled with dancing girls, women should have bars filled with cats. Thus relieving stress. – Not a Genius
6	6	Stewart Lee	1 May 2009
1) Have swimming lanes built next to cycling lanes. – Not a Genius 2) Virtual reality headsets for chickens: Genius 3) Vans delivering fattening food should be constantly moving so that people have to run and get fit if they want the food. – Not a Genius 4) Wire pianos to lights which are held by members of a choir. When one of the lights is lit up, the choir member holding it sings a particular note. – Winning Genius

=== Series 2 (2010) ===
No. overall	No. in series	Guest judge	Original release date
7	1	Russell Howard and Hazel Irvine	27 September 2010
8	2	Jane Moore and The Hairy Bikers	4 October 2010
9	3	Vanessa Feltz and Richard Herring	11 October 2010
10	4	Chris Addison and Mel Giedroyc	18 October 2010
11	5	Tim Minchin and Alexei Sayle	25 October 2010
12	6	Noddy Holder and Shappi Khorsandi	31 October 2010
