= Stefan Th. Gries =

- Born: 1970 (age 55–56); Hamburg, West Germany
- Education: University of Hamburg
- Scientific career
- Fields: corpus linguistics, cognitive linguistics
- Workplaces: University of California, Santa Barbara; University of Giessen; University of Marburg; University of Leipzig; Lancaster University; Max Planck Institute for Evolutionary Anthropology; University of Southern Denmark; University of Hamburg

Stefan Th. Gries (['ʃtɛfɐn 'tʰoːmɐs 'ɡʁiːs]) is Distinguished Professor of Linguistics in the Department of Linguistics at the University of California, Santa Barbara (UCSB), Honorary Liebig-Professor of the Justus-Liebig-Universität Giessen (since September 2011), and since 1 April 2018 also Chair of English Linguistics (Corpus Linguistics with a focus on quantitative methods, 25%) in the Department of English at the Justus-Liebig-Universität Giessen.

== Career ==
Gries earned his M.A. and Ph.D. degrees at the University of Hamburg, Germany in 1998 and 2000 and his Habilitation/Venia Legendi at the University of Marburg in 2024. He was at the Department of Business Communication and Information Science of the University of Southern Denmark at Sønderborg (1998–2005), first as a lecturer, then as assistant professor and tenured associate professor; during that time, he also taught English linguistics part-time at the Department of British and American Studies of the University of Hamburg. In 2005, he spent 10 months as a visiting scholar in the Psychology Department of the Max Planck Institute for Evolutionary Anthropology in Leipzig, Germany, before he accepted a position at UCSB, starting November 1, 2005. Gries was a visiting professor at the 2007, 2011, 2013, 2015, 2019, and 2025 LSA Linguistic Institutes at Stanford University, the University of Colorado at Boulder, the University of Michigan, Ann Arbor, the University of Chicago, the University of California, Davis, and the University of Oregon in 2025 and in 2027 He was also a Visiting Chair (2013–2017) of the Centre for Corpus Approaches to Social Science at Lancaster University and the Leibniz Professor (spring semester 2017) at the Research Academy Leipzig of the Leipzig University.^{,}

== Research ==
Methodologically, Gries is a quantitative corpus linguist at the intersection of corpus linguistics, cognitive linguistics, and quantitative linguistics, who uses a variety of different statistical methods to investigate linguistic topics such as morphophonology (the formation of morphological blends), syntax (syntactic alternations), the syntax-lexis interface (collostructional analysis), and semantics (polysemy, antonymy, and near synonymy in English and Russian) and corpus-linguistic methodology (corpus homogeneity and comparisons, association and dispersion measures, n-gram identification and exploration, and other quantitative methods), as well as first and second/foreign language acquisition and corpus linguistics and legal interpretation. Occasionally and mainly collaboratively, he also uses experimental methods (acceptability judgments, sentence completion, priming, self-paced reading times, and sorting tasks). As per five of the last six books he has written and the last book he co-edited, much of his recent work involves the open source software R.

Theoretically, he is a cognitively oriented usage-based linguist (with an interest in Construction Grammar) in the wider sense of seeking explanations in terms of cognitive processes without being a cognitive linguist in the narrower sense of following any one particular cognitive-linguistic theory. The researchers who have influenced his work most are R. Harald Baayen, Douglas Biber, Nick C. Ellis, Adele E. Goldberg, and Michael Tomasello.

== Publications ==
=== Books written by Gries ===
- Gries, Stefan Th. 2003. Multifactorial analysis in corpus linguistics: A study of particle placement. New York: Continuum. ISBN 9780826461261 (hardback); ISBN 9780826476067
- Gries, Stefan Th. 2008. Statistik für Sprachwissenschaftler. Studienbücher zur Linguistik, vol 13. Göttingen: Vandenhoeck & Ruprecht. ISBN 9783525265512.
- Gries, Stefan Th. 2009. Quantitative corpus linguistics with R: A practical introduction. New York: Routledge. ISBN 9780415962711 (hardback); ISBN 9780415962704
- Gries, Stefan Th. 2009. Statistics for linguistics with R: A practical introduction. Berlin: Walter de Gruyter. ISBN 9783110205657.
- Gries, Stefan Th. 2013. Statistics for linguistics with R: A practical introduction. 2nd rev. & ext. ed. Berlin: Walter de Gruyter. ISBN 9783110307283 (also translated into Korean, Chinese, and Brazilian Portuguese).
- Gries, Stefan Th. 2016. Quantitative corpus linguistics with R: A practical introduction. 2nd rev. & ext. ed. New York: Routledge. ISBN 9781138816275; ISBN 9781138816282.
- Gries, Stefan Th. 2017. Ten lectures on quantitative approaches in cognitive linguistics: Corpus-linguistic, experimental, and statistical applications. Leiden: Brill. ISBN 9789004336216
- Gries, Stefan Th. 2019 Ten lectures on corpus linguistics with R: Applications for usage-based and psycholinguistic research. Leiden: Brill. ISBN 9789004410343
- Gries, Stefan Th. 2021. Statistics for linguistics with R: A practical introduction. 3rd rev. & ext. ed. Berlin: Walter de Gruyter. ISBN 9783110718164.
- Gries, Stefan Th. 2024. Frequency, dispersion, association, and keyness: Revising and tupleizing corpus-linguistic measures. Amsterdam & Philadelphia: John Benjamins. ISBN 9789027214928.

=== Books co-edited by Gries ===
- Gries, Stefan Th. & Anatol Stefanowitsch (eds.) 2006. Corpora in cognitive linguistics: Corpus-based approaches to syntax and lexis. Berlin & New York: Mouton De Gruyter. ISBN 9783110186055 (hardback); ISBN 9783110197709 (paperback).
- Stefanowitsch, Anatol & Stefan Th. Gries (eds.). 2006. Corpus-based approaches to metaphor and metonymy. Berlin & New York: Walter de Gruyter. ISBN 9783119162906 (hardback); ISBN 9783110198270 (paperback).
- Gries, Stefan Th., Stefanie Wulff, & Mark Davies (eds.). 2010. Corpus-Linguistic applications: Current studies, new directions. Amsterdam & New York: Rodopi. ISBN 9789042028012.
- Brdar, Mario, Stefan Th. Gries, & Milena Žic Fuchs (eds.). 2011. Cognitive linguistics: Convergence and expansion. Amsterdam & Philadelphia: John Benjamins. ISBN 9789027223869.
- Divjak, Dagmar & Stefan Th. Gries (eds.). 2012. Frequency effects in language representation. Berlin & Boston: Mouton De Gruyter. ISBN 9783110273786.
- Gries, Stefan Th. & Dagmar Divjak (eds.). 2012. Frequency effects in language learning and processing. Berlin & Boston: Mouton De Gruyter. ISBN 9783110273762.
- Yoon, Jiyoung & Stefan Th. Gries (eds.). 2016. Corpus-based approaches to Construction Grammar. Amsterdam & Philadelphia: John Benjamins. ISBN 9789027204417.
- Paquot, Magali & Stefan Th. Gries (eds.). 2020. A practical handbook of corpus linguistics. Berlin & New York: Springer. ISBN 9783030462154.

=== Others ===
Gries has edited a special issue of the Brazilian Journal of Applied Linguistics and has co-edited two special issues of Corpus Linguistics and Linguistic Theory. He has (co-)written articles in Cognitive Linguistics, International Journal of Corpus Linguistics and many other peer-reviewed journals. He was the co-founder (2005), editor-in-chief (2010-2015), general editor (2016-2023), and co-editor-in-chief (2005-2010, 2024-) of the international peer-reviewed journal Corpus Linguistics and Linguistic Theory, co-editor-in-chief of Journal of Research Design and Statistics in Linguistics and Communication Science, and associate co-editor of Cognitive Linguistic Studies, and performs editorial functions for the international peer-reviewed journals Brazilian Journal of Applied Linguistics, Cognitive Linguistics, Cognitive Semantics, CogniTextes, Constructions, Constructions and Frames, Corpora, Corpus Linguistics Research, Corpus Pragmatics, Glottotheory, International Journal of Corpus Linguistics, International Journal of Learner Corpus Research, Journal of Language Modelling, Journal of Second Language Studies, Language and Cognition, Research Methods in Applied Linguistics, Ampersand, and Linguistics and Literature Review, Text & Talk, as well as for the book series Cognitive Linguistics in Practice, Studies in Corpus Linguistics, Cambridge Elements in Corpus Linguistics, Corpora and Language in Use and Explorations in English Language and Linguistics.
