= Dave Gorman: Modern Life Is Goodish =

British TV comedy series

- Genre: Stand-up comedy
- Written by: Dave Gorman
- Directed by: Paul Wheeler
- Presented by: Dave Gorman
- Opening theme: "Pirouette" by Stickboy
- Country of origin: United Kingdom
- Original language: English
- No. of series: 6 (+1 highlights series)
- No. of episodes: 39 (+3 highlights episodes)

Production
- Executive producers: Jamie Isaacs; Iain Coyle (Series 2–3)
- Producers: Nick Martin; James Fidler
- Running time: 45 minutes
- Production company: Liberty Bell

Original release
- Network: Dave
- Release: September 17, 2013 – December 19, 2017
- Release: February 24 – March 10, 2025

Dave Gorman: Modern Life Is Goodish is a British comedy television show that ran for five series between 2013 and 2017, with a revival series in 2025. It was broadcast on Dave and presented by Dave Gorman. The series mainly consisted of Gorman presenting comedic PowerPoint presentations in which he attempts to argue that modern life is neither bad nor good, but "good...ish". The series began on 17 September 2013. A fifth series began airing on 31 October 2017.

Gorman announced on 18 December 2017 that the show would conclude after the final episode of series 5 aired the following night. However, in July 2024 it was announced that four brand-new hour-long specials had been ordered by UKTV for their rebranded U&Dave channel. A sixth series began airing on 24 February 2025. Despite earlier reports that it would comprise four episodes, though, it instead consisted of three, with the fourth recorded episode having been dropped since part of it featured material centring on the rise to fame of Gregg Wallace – the episode was recorded before it was reported that Wallace was under investigation following allegations of historical misconduct, which Wallace denies. Two segments of the fourth episode that do not centre on Wallace were released as standalone features on U's streaming platform.

== Format ==
Each episode sees Gorman present a stand-up show using PowerPoint, on a particular theme about modern life. Examples include celebrity culture and social media. Each episode features a recurring section called the "Found Poem", in which Gorman reads out a selection of bizarre comments left on news websites, all covering a particular story. Gorman performs the Found Poem with a lone spotlight shining on him, while accompanied by the Billroth String Quartet (Billroth Ensemble from Series 4) playing 'Sarabande' from George Frideric Handel's Keyboard suite in D minor (HWV 437). The title of each episode comes from a line out of the Found Poem.

== Production ==
The programmes were recorded at the Tabernacle, Notting Hill. The episodes were recorded in pairs. Prior to the final recordings, Gorman did "dry run" performances of each episode's content in small theatres. Gorman frequently rewrote portions of the performance after the dry runs.

The show was labour-intensive to create; in the final three weeks before taping a pair of episodes, Gorman would work for over 100 hours a week. The heavy workload was one of the contributing factors to the decision to end the show in 2017. Another factor was Gorman's decision to tour in 2018.

The show's title is similar to that of the 1993 Blur album Modern Life Is Rubbish. When asked if the title was an intentional reference, Gorman said 'I think it's a Blur reference if you want it to be. The "rubbish" version, I think, comes to mind anyway. I just like that'.

== Series overview ==
Series	Episodes	Originally released	
Series	Episodes	First released	Last released
Series 1	6	17 September 2013	22 October 2013
Series 2	8	9 September 2014	28 October 2014
Series 3	8	8 September 2015	27 October 2015
Goodish Hits	3	11 May 2016	25 May 2016
Series 4	6	8 November 2016	13 December 2016
Series 5	8	31 October 2017	19 December 2017
Series 6	3	24 February 2025	10 March 2025

== Episodes ==
=== Series 1 (2013) ===
No. overall	No. in series	Title	Directed by	Written by	Original release date	Viewers (millions)
1	1	"Not a Very Nice Biscuit"	Paul Wheeler	Dave Gorman	17 September 2013	518,000
2	2	"Badgers Don't Vote"	Paul Wheeler	Dave Gorman	24 September 2013	457,000
3	3	"I Is Da Queen"	Paul Wheeler	Dave Gorman	1 October 2013	441,000
4	4	"A Prince, Not an Estate Agent"	Paul Wheeler	Dave Gorman	8 October 2013	512,000
5	5	"I Like Eggs"	Paul Wheeler	Dave Gorman	15 October 2013	643,000
6	6	"Will It Make Toasters Cheaper?"	Paul Wheeler	Dave Gorman	22 October 2013	513,000

=== Series 2 (2014) ===
No. overall	No. in series	Title	Directed by	Written by	Original release date	Viewers (millions)
7	1	"I Call Mine Sally"	Paul Wheeler	Dave Gorman	9 September 2014	612,000
8	2	"Winston Churchill's Pants"	Paul Wheeler	Dave Gorman	16 September 2014	550,000
9	3	"Just Chips That Haven't Been Made Yet"	Paul Wheeler	Dave Gorman	23 September 2014	495,000
10	4	"Poogle"	Paul Wheeler	Dave Gorman	30 September 2014	533,000
11	5	"I Would Drink That Bathwater"	Paul Wheeler	Dave Gorman	7 October 2014	588,000
12	6	"Dat Is Data Dat Is"	Paul Wheeler	Dave Gorman	14 October 2014	650,000
13	7	"I Like Hot Bananas"	Paul Wheeler	Dave Gorman	21 October 2014	523,000
14	8	"The Dirt Collects There"	Paul Wheeler	Dave Gorman	28 October 2014	573,000

=== Series 3 (2015) ===
No. overall	No. in series	Title	Directed by	Written by	Original release date	Viewers (millions)
15	1	"Why Are There Still Chickens?"	Paul Wheeler	Dave Gorman	8 September 2015	638,000
16	2	"The Veneer of Civilisation"	Paul Wheeler	Dave Gorman	15 September 2015	685,000
17	3	"Ova Is Latin. For Eggs"	Paul Wheeler	Dave Gorman	22 September 2015	611,000
18	4	"Too-Ra Taloo Rye-Eh"	Paul Wheeler	Dave Gorman	29 September 2015	592,000
19	5	"Negative Nancy"	Paul Wheeler	Dave Gorman	6 October 2015	525,000
20	6	"Stuck on Level 342"	Paul Wheeler	Dave Gorman	13 October 2015	668,000
21	7	"That's What We Grow In"	Paul Wheeler	Dave Gorman	20 October 2015	706,000
22	8	"A German Tradition"	Paul Wheeler	Dave Gorman	27 October 2015	696,000

=== Goodish Hits (2016) ===
No. overall	No. in series	Title	Directed by	Written by	Original release date
–	1	"Series 1 Highlights"	Paul Wheeler	Dave Gorman	11 May 2016
–	2	"Series 2 Highlights"	Paul Wheeler	Dave Gorman	18 May 2016
–	3	"Series 3 Highlights"	Paul Wheeler	Dave Gorman	25 May 2016

=== Series 4 (2016) ===
Series 4 of Modern Life Is Goodish was confirmed on 7 August 2015. The series contained only 6 episodes because Gorman took a break to look after his expected baby. The show began airing on Dave on 8 November 2016.

No. overall	No. in series	Title	Directed by	Written by	Original release date	Viewers (millions)
23	1	"It Was an Accident and I Was Hospitalised"	Paul Wheeler	Dave Gorman	8 November 2016	608,000 (7 days); 671,000 (28 days)
24	2	"If You Put a Sausage in It, It's Not a Viennetta"	Paul Wheeler	Dave Gorman	15 November 2016	637,000 (7 days); 643,000 (28 days)
25	3	"That's What Debt Actually Is, Actually"	Paul Wheeler	Dave Gorman	22 November 2016	755,000 (7 days); 797,000 (28 days)
26	4	"Vicars, Horses, Doctors and Smurfs"	Paul Wheeler	Dave Gorman	29 November 2016	631,000 (7 days); 690,000 (28 days)
27	5	"Nobody Wants Vom on Their Cheerios"	Paul Wheeler	Dave Gorman	6 December 2016	698,000 (7 days); 733,000 (28 days)
28	6	"Spray Gravy"	Paul Wheeler	Dave Gorman	13 December 2016	515,000 (7 days); 539,000 (28 days)

=== Series 5 (2017) ===
Series 5 of Modern Life Is Goodish was also confirmed on 7 August 2015; the series contained 8 episodes. Gorman announced on 18 December 2017 that there would be no sixth series. However, in 2024 it was reported that the show would be back.

No. overall	No. in series	Title	Directed by	Written by	Original release date	Viewers (millions)
29	1	"Like Top Gun All Over Again"	Paul Wheeler	Dave Gorman	31 October 2017	515,000 (7 days); 573,000 (28 days)
30	2	"I've Never Seen a Cat"	Paul Wheeler	Dave Gorman	7 November 2017	517,000 (7 days); 549,000 (28 days)
31	3	"A Helicopter Is Quicker Than a Car"	Paul Wheeler	Dave Gorman	14 November 2017	574,000 (7 days); 583,000 (28 days)
32	4	"You Use a Spoon for Licking Custard"	Paul Wheeler	Dave Gorman	21 November 2017	601,000 (7 days); 620,000 (28 days)
33	5	"It Does Not Bong"	Paul Wheeler	Dave Gorman	28 November 2017	539,000 (7 days); 582,000 (28 days)
34	6	"Drippy Strummer"	Paul Wheeler	Dave Gorman	5 December 2017	502,000 (7 days)
35	7	"A Physically Large Head"	Paul Wheeler	Dave Gorman	12 December 2017	445,000 (7 days)
36	8	"My Childhood Is Ruined"	Paul Wheeler	Dave Gorman	19 December 2017	457,000 (7 days)

=== Series 6 (2025) ===
Series 6 of Modern Life Is Goodish contained 3 episodes, 1 fewer than the previously announced 4.

One of the four episodes was dropped due to it containing significant amounts of material pertaining to Gregg Wallace and his BBC television programme Inside the Factory. The material had been written before historical allegations of sexual harassment against Wallace became known. Material from the episode that does not mention Wallace, was released on the U&Dave website.

No. overall	No. in series	Title	Directed by	Written by	Original release date	Viewers (millions)
37	1	"Twelve is the Number We Do Things"	Paul Wheeler	Dave Gorman	24 February 2025	-
38	2	"That's Why Seas Are Salty"	Paul Wheeler	Dave Gorman	24 February 2025	-
39	3	"Britain Is Also An Island"	Paul Wheeler	Dave Gorman	24 February 2025	-

== Notes ==
1. Ratings sourced from the Broadcasters' Audience Research Board.
2. 453,000 on Dave and 59,000 on Dave Ja Vu
3. 582,000 on Dave and 61,000 on Dave Ja Vu
4. 504,000 on Dave and 46,000 on Dave Ja Vu
5. 455,000 on Dave and 40,000 on Dave Ja Vu
6. 478,000 on Dave and 55,000 on Dave Ja Vu
7. 592,000 on Dave and 58,000 on Dave Ja Vu
8. 565,000 on Dave and 73,000 on Dave Ja Vu
9. 611,000 on Dave and 74,000 on Dave Ja Vu
10. 621,000 on Dave and 85,000 on Dave Ja Vu
