= Documentary comedy =

Comedic form

Documentary comedy is a form of comedy. The comic material used is presented in documentary style—usually, a report on a particular theme or issue—and with the same investigation and reporting methods used to gather the material.

Well-known documentary comics include Dave Gorman, Danny Wallace, Tony Hawks, John Clarke and Bryan Dawe, Alex Horne, and Mark Steel.

Often they are also done in a Gonzo journalism style, incorporating the documentarian as a comedic element or foil. All Gas No Brakes, Louis Theroux, Nathan Fielder, and John Wilson are prominent figures in this sub-genre.

Docucomedy specials are also a common example of documentary comedy, interspersing traditional comedy with personal moments. However with the advent of social media comedy, the lines between traditional comedy and the presentation of authentic personal lives has been blurred

It is not to be confused with mockumentary, a form of spoof in which a documentary is played "straight" but based on fictitious material.
