= Collocational restriction =

In linguistic morphology, collocational restriction is the way some words have special meanings in specific two-word phrases. For example the adjective "dry" only means "not sweet" in combination with the noun "wine". Such phrases are often considered idiomatic.

Another example is the word "white", which has specific meanings when used with "wine", "coffee," "noise," "chess piece," or "person." These usages can be said to be idiomatic because in each case the word "white" changes from its normal usage.

== Bibliography ==
- Andrew Carstairs-McCarthy (30 November 2018). Introduction to English Morphology: Words and Their Structure (2nd ed.). Edinburgh University Press. ISBN 978-1-4744-2899-6.
- Crystal, D. (2003), A Dictionary of Linguistics and Phonetics, Blackwell, Oxford.

== See also ==
- Collocation
