= English collocations =

Combinations of closely affiliated words

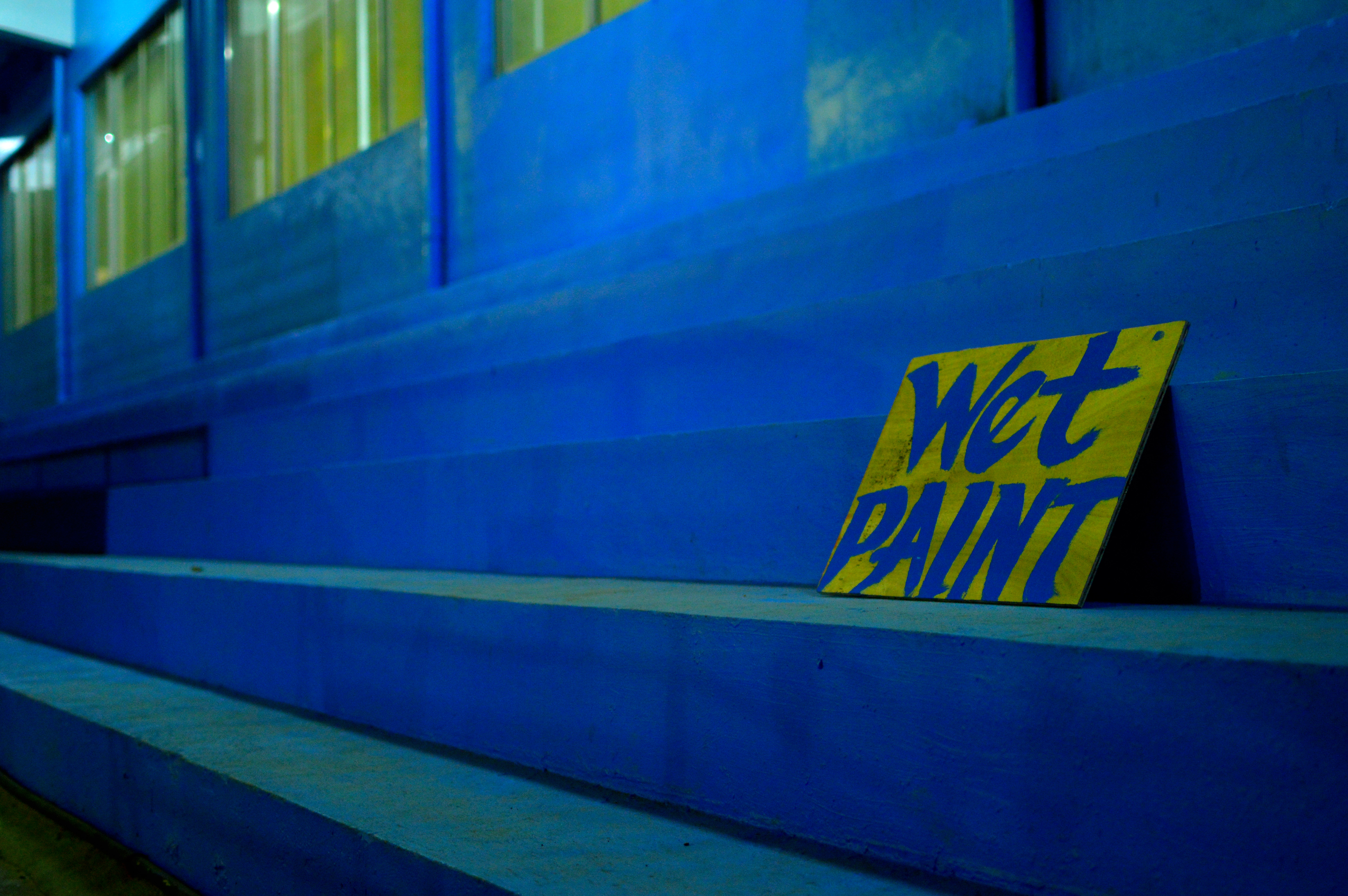
A sign using a common collocation in English

English collocations are a natural combination of words closely affiliated with each other. Some examples are "all alone", "wet paint", "make an effort", and "powerful engine". Collocations make it easier to avoid overused or ambiguous words such as "very", "nice", or "beautiful", by using a pair of words that fit the context better and that feature a more precise meaning. Skilled users of the language can produce effects such as humor by varying the normal patterns of collocation. This approach is popular with poets, journalists and advertisers.

Collocations may seem natural to native writers and speakers, but are not obvious to non-native speakers.

Compare:

natural English	unnatural English
all alone	completely alone
the fast train	the quick train
a quick shower	a fast shower
a quick meal	a fast meal

Some collocations are fixed. Others are more open, where different words might be used to give the same meaning, as an example keep to or stick to the rules.

== Compounds and idioms ==
Compounds are units of meaning formed with two or more words. The words are usually written separately, but some may be hyphenated or be written as one word.

Often the meaning of the compound can be guessed by knowing the meaning of the individual words. It is not always simple to detach collocations and compounds.

- car park
- post office
- narrow minded
- shoelaces
- teapot

Idioms are collection of words in a fixed order that have a sense that cannot be guessed by knowing the meaning of the individual vocabularies. For example: pass the buck is an idiom meaning "to pass responsibility for a problem to another person to avoid dealing with it".

== Types ==
Collocations combine various parts of speech

=== Adjectives and nouns ===
- Merry Christmas
- Joe always wears blue or white or some other bright color.
- We had a brief chat about Iraq but didn’t have time to discuss it properly.
- Unemployment is a major problem for the government these days.
- Improving the health service is another key issue for the UK.

=== Nouns and verbs ===
- The economy boomed in 2002.
- The company has grown and now employs more than 30 people.
- The company has expanded and now has branches in most major countries.
- The four companies merged in 2013.
- They launched the product in 1998.
- The price increase poses a problem for them.
- The internet has created opportunities for his company.
- There was heavy snowfall when our plane took off.

=== Noun + noun ===
There are a lot of collocations with pattern a(n) ... of ...

- A surge of anger
- A sense of pride
- A pang of nostalgia
- A slice of bread
- A pound of butter
- A piece of paper
- A bouquet of flowers

=== Verbs and expression with prepositions ===
- As Bob went on stage to receive his medal you could see his sister swelling with pride.
- I was filled with horror when I read the newspaper report of the war.
- When she spilt apple-juice on her new blue skirt the little girl burst into tears.

=== Verbs and adverbs ===
- He pulled steadily on the rope and helped her to safety.
- She placed the beautiful jar gently on the window ledge.
- ‘I love you and want to marry you,’ Michael whispered softly to Clare.
- He smiled proudly as he looked at the photos of his new granddaughter.

=== Adverbs and adjectives ===
- Ben and Jane are a happily married couple.
- You are fully aware that there are serious problems.
- George was blissfully unaware that he was in danger.

=== Adjective + Noun + Noun ===
The collocation with pattern: a(n) (some adjective) state of repair, is one example.

- The barn was in a poor state of repair.

== Literature ==
- Oxford Collocations Dictionary for students of English
- Longman Collocations Dictionary and Thesaurus
