= "How's my driving?" sign =

Sign on the back of a vehicle

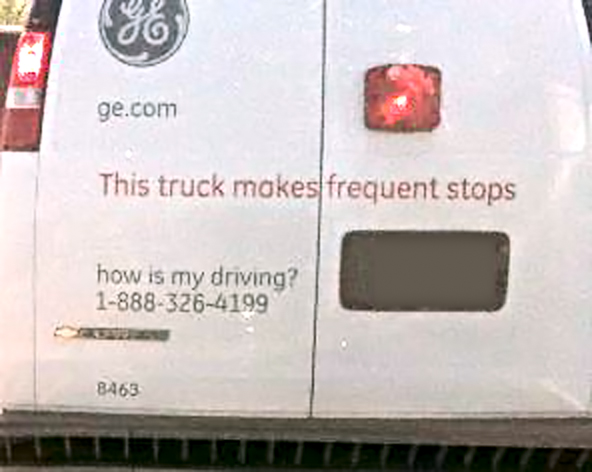
A white GE van with a how's my driving sign

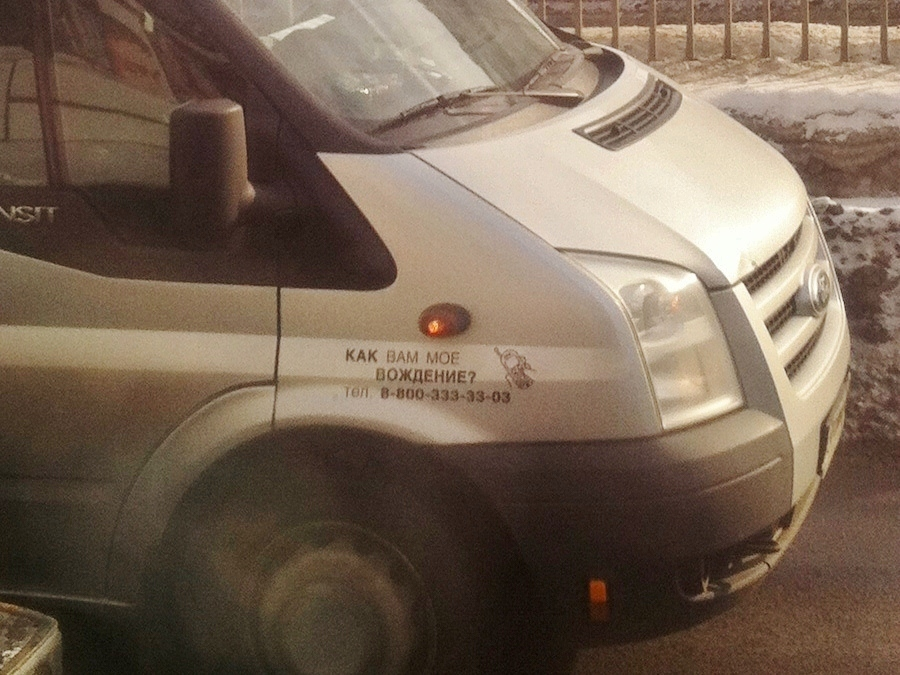
How's my driving ("Как вам мое вождение?") sign in Russia

A "how's my driving" sign (or "how is my driving" or similar) is a decal posted or painted on a back of a fleet vehicle or other vehicle operated by an employee driver. The phone number, website address, and other identifying information are typically included on the sticker so that members of the public can call and report on the actions of the driver of the vehicle. Depending on the company, the phone number or website is monitored by the vehicle's owner or by a third-party company.

Similar programs have also been implemented for vehicles driven by teenagers and drunk drivers in hopes of improving the safety of both groups while driving. Use of "How's My Driving" regimes for systems other than traffic have been discussed, also in relation to eBay and Wikipedia.

The purpose of the decal is to increase traffic safety, as those who know they are driving a vehicle with a decal would want to drive more safely to not draw complaints.

== Frequency of complaints ==
About 10% of vehicles bearing this decal become the target of complaints.

The most common complaints fielded are tailgating, improper lane changes, speeding, and running red lights, though it has been found that many bored motorists who have cell phones will call in petty complaints. A small percentage of calls are to compliment drivers.

== Effects ==
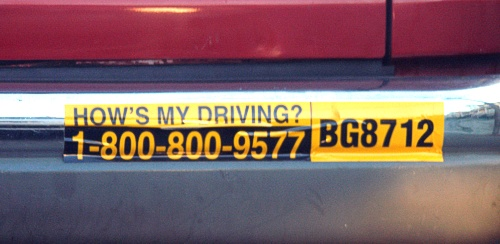
A feedback bumper sticker

Studies have found that vehicles displaying the decal are involved in 22% fewer accidents and result in a 52% reduction in accident-related costs.

Some insurance companies offer discounts to fleets that display the decal.

Other countries are starting to experiment with similar programs, such as Germany.

=== Effects of complaints ===
When a complaint is made, the receptionist who fields the complaint will generally ask for basic information regarding the vehicle and incident, such as the vehicle's description (e.g. a white van), the location of the incident, and the weather of the day.

Truck companies use the reports to spot problem drivers.

Complaints received by motorists may or may not affect the employment status of the operator of the vehicle. In the worst cases, complaints may result in a reprimand against the operator and possibly termination.

== Parodies ==
Popular parodies of the signs have been created, typically in the form of bumper stickers which provide a fictitious toll-free phoneword that spells out a profanity. In 1987, a truck driver from Cottondale, Alabama, was prosecuted under state obscenity laws for a sticker which read "How's My Driving? Call 1-800-EAT-SHIT". In the case of Baker v. Glover, Judge Myron H. Thompson of the United States District Court for the Middle District of Alabama ruled that the driver's sticker was a protected form of speech under the First Amendment. Thompson wrote in his ruling that the parody sticker "has serious political value as a protest against the 'Big Brother' mentality promoted by such other bumper stickers that urge the public to report the indiscretions of truck drivers."
