= Spoke beads =

Bicycle accessory

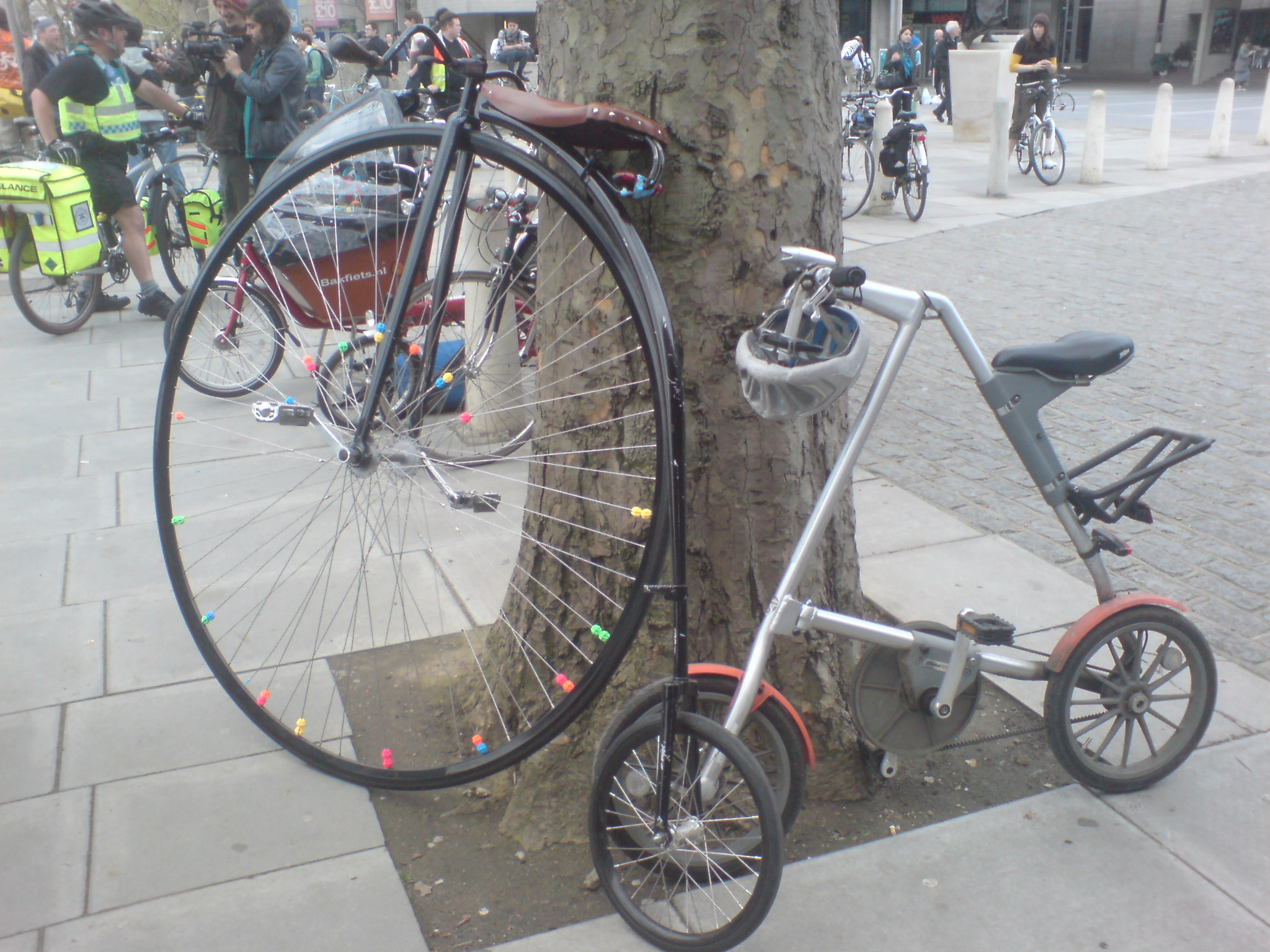
A penny-farthing with attached spoke beads

Spoke beads (sometimes sold as Spokey Dokeys) are a bicycle accessory, originating in the 1980s, most popular with children. They are plastic beads that attach onto bicycle wheel spokes.

At low speeds, the beads slide up and down the spokes and produce a clicking sound. At higher speeds, centrifugal force moves them outward toward the rim, where they remain relatively stationary and become silent. The beads are known for their varied colors and patterns and were mainly used aesthetically, though there was a belief that the bright beads made cyclists more visible to traffic.

The idea was created by a California man, Larry Harmen. He was able to develop the prototypes and then license it to a toy company.
