= Dave Gorman =

English comedian (born 1971)

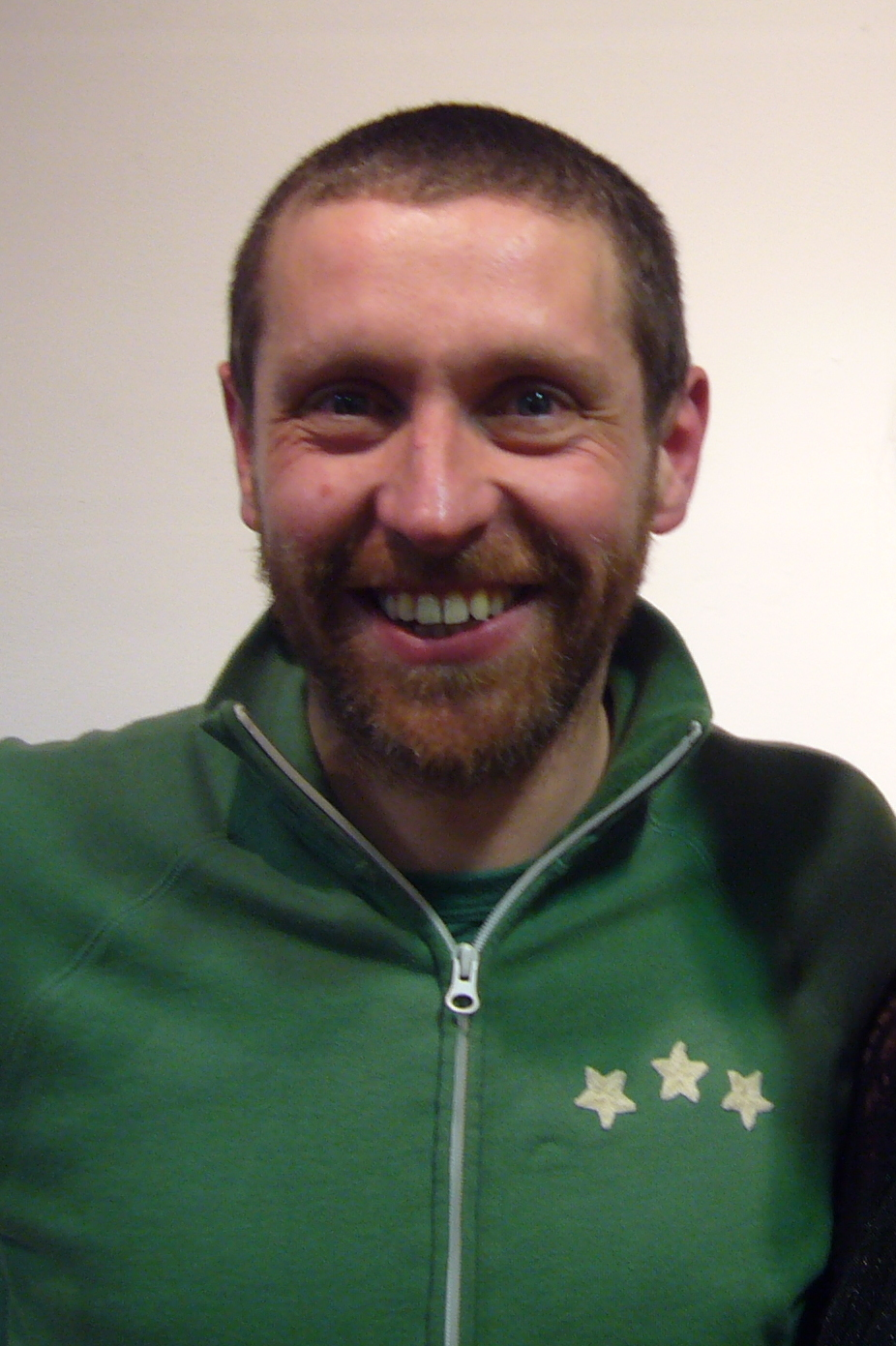
- Gorman in 2008
- Born: David James Gorman; 2 March 1971 (age 55); Stafford, England
- Occupation: Comedian
- Years active: 1993–present
- Spouse: Beth Gorman (m. 2010)
- Children: 1
- Website: davegorman.com

David James Gorman (born 2 March 1971) is an English comedian.

Gorman began his career writing for comedy series such as The Mrs Merton Show (1993–1998) and The Fast Show (1994–1997), and later garnered acclaim for his stand-up shows, one of which earned him a nomination for a Perrier Award. He became widely known for his Are You Dave Gorman? stage show, which he debuted at the 2000 Edinburgh Fringe Festival, while its television adaptation was broadcast as The Dave Gorman Collection in 2001.

Gorman followed Are You Dave Gorman? with several other stand-up shows or comedic concepts that were turned into television series, including Dave Gorman's Googlewhack Adventure (2003–2005), Genius (2009–2010), and Dave Gorman: Modern Life Is Goodish (2013–2017, 2025). He has also been a guest on other shows such as Have I Got News for You, Taskmaster, Go 8 Bit, They Think It's All Over, and QI.

== Early life ==
David James Gorman was born in Stafford on 2 March 1971. He has a twin brother named Nicholas. He attended Walton High School in Stafford, and later studied mathematics at the University of Manchester, but dropped out after two years.

== Career ==
=== Early work ===
Before his solo successes, he co-wrote three series of The Mrs Merton Show, as well as writing for other television series in the UK, including The Fast Show. In 2003, he was listed in The Observer as one of the 50 funniest acts in British comedy. As a producer, Gorman contributed to two series featuring Jenny Eclair. He has also written for comedians Harry Hill and Steve Coogan.

Gorman's first one-man "documentary style" show was titled Reasons to be Cheerful. The show was first performed at the 1998 Edinburgh Festival Fringe and toured theatres afterwards.

His second full-length show, Dave Gorman's Better World, was first performed in Edinburgh in 1999.

=== Are You Dave Gorman? ===
A drunken bet with his flatmate Danny Wallace became the backdrop to a book written by Gorman, and a play written by Wallace. Gorman claimed he shared the name Dave Gorman with the assistant manager of East Fife F.C. and that there must be "loads" of others around.

=== Dave Gorman's Important Astrology Experiment ===
Gorman's second television series, broadcast on BBC Two in September 2002, was titled Dave Gorman's Important Astrology Experiment and was based upon the idea of a controlled scientific experiment, although naturally not a serious one. The series had six episodes.

=== Dave Gorman's Googlewhack Adventure ===
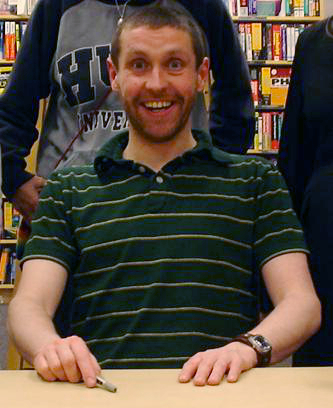
Gorman at a signing event for his Googlewhack Adventure book, in 2005

In 2003, Gorman toured Britain with a show titled Dave Gorman's Googlewhack Adventure, and published a book of the same name. It is another true story.

=== Dave Gorman versus the Rest of the World ===
In 2011, Gorman published a book about his adventures in various British towns, during a period of his life when he challenged people to invite him to game-playing sessions. The book explains games of Bluke, Khet, Kubb, Smite, Settlers of Catan, Monopoly, Poker and others.

=== Genius ===
==== Radio series ====
He hosted a BBC Radio 4 show called Genius, in which members of the public submitted suggestions to make a better world. Gorman and a guest then assess the idea in order to determine whether it qualifies as "genius".

==== TV series ====
A pilot for a television version of Genius was recorded on 23 November 2007, and a series was commissioned in the spring of 2008.

The six-part series started on Friday 20 March, 10pm on BBC2. A second series for 2010 was commissioned by the BBC.

=== The Daily Show with Jon Stewart ===
On 24 April 2006, Gorman made his first appearance as a reporter (he had previously appeared as a guest on 11 December 2001 promoting Are You Dave Gorman?), in which he was credited as the show's senior new correspondent. On 27 April, he debuted as the host of the show's satirical statistical analysis piece called "Poll Smoking with Dave Gorman". He was the first Daily Show correspondent to have been born in England, and the third Daily Show correspondent to have been born outside of the United States. His most recent appearance on the show was on 5 October 2006. He has also appeared co-hosting a segment called "ConTROVersy" with the Daily Show's other English correspondent, John Oliver, in which the pair calmly and genteelly discussed former UK Prime Minister Tony Blair over tea, parodying American stereotypes of Britons.

=== America Unchained ===
Between 22 October and 5 December 2006, Gorman undertook a coast-to-coast road trip through 17 states from the west coast to east coast of the United States. A book about the trip, titled America Unchained: A Freewheeling Roadtrip in Search of Non-Corporate USA, was released on 3 April 2008. The rationale for the trip was to discover whether it is possible to travel across the United States without ever patronising any corporate or chain-style businesses ("The Man").

A documentary film of the adventure was also made and was aired on the British TV channel More4 on 5 February 2008 and released on DVD on 11 February.

=== Absolute Radio ===
Gorman had a show on Absolute Radio. His first show aired on 11 October 2009, with Gorman joined by Danielle Ward and Martin White. White left the show in April 2012, to be replaced by Michael Legge. The show ended on 18 November 2012.

=== Stand-up ===
Gorman performed as a stand up earlier in his career.

=== Modern Life Is Goodish ===
In September 2013, Gorman returned to television with a new show, Modern Life Is Goodish, on the Dave channel. In January 2014, the show was renewed for two additional series to follow the initial three. The fourth series commenced in November 2016. The fifth series ran from 31 October to 20 December 2017, after which Gorman confirmed that it was the final series. At its peak, the series attracted 1.5 million viewers. On 1 February 2025, Gorman announced that there would be a sixth series releasing on 24 February 2025. Unlike prior series it will consist of three episodes.

=== With Great PowerPoint Comes Great ResponsibilityPoint ===
On 13 November 2017, towards the end of the run of Modern Life Is Goodish, Gorman announced a new stage show to conclude the series called With Great PowerPoint Comes Great ResponsibilityPoint. The show had an initial run from 6 September to 25 November 2018. Since then, Gorman has announced 19 more tour dates for January–February 2019 due to the number of tickets sold. While Gorman has wished for the contents of the show to remain unspoiled for people going into the show, he has requested that people talk about the Giraffe joke, which Gorman has cited as being the best giraffe joke in the world. Because of the popularity of the show, after a short break during the filming of Terms and Conditions Apply, Gorman continued to tour until November 2019.

=== Terms and Conditions Apply ===
In June 2019, it was announced on Chortle that Gorman would be hosting a new TV series on Dave called Terms and Conditions Apply, with eight one-hour long episodes. The format is similar to that of Modern Life Is Goodish, but Gorman was joined by guest stars on each episode, competing in various games based on the subjects presented. Filming for the first series took place from 2 July to 29 August 2019. It began airing on Dave in October 2019.

=== PowerPoint to the People ===
On 30 April 2022, Dave Gorman announced another live stage show tour called PowerPoint to the People for autumn 2022. It originally ran from 10 September to 11 November 2022.

Extra dates were then added, running from 16 March 2023 until 17 June 2023. The tour was extended again up to 13 December 2023.

=== Other appearances ===
In 2008, Gorman was a team captain on What the Dickens?, hosted by Sandi Toksvig on Sky Arts.

Gorman appeared on the week-long special Grand Designs Live, in which he showcased eccentric houses in the United States in 2015.

In 2020, Gorman began setting cryptic crosswords for three British newspapers, first for The Independent under the pseudonym "Bluth" then for The Daily Telegraph under the name "Django" and The Guardian under the name "Fed".

== Personal life ==
Gorman and his wife, Beth, were married on 8 October 2010. They live in Bournemouth and have a son, Eric.

During his performance at the 2011 Edinburgh Fringe Festival, Gorman referred to himself as an "atheist from a Christian background". He has been mistakenly identified as Jewish, which once led to his inclusion in the Jewish magazine JLifestyle's list of top "literary Jews" in 2008. Gorman is a pescatarian.
