= Wei-Heng Chen =

Chinese linguist

Wei-Heng Chen (陈卫恒; 陳衛恆) is a Chinese linguist who is a professor of English and linguistics at Beijing Language and Culture University. Chen was the education consul of China at the Chinese Consulate-General, Los Angeles.

== Work ==
Chen is noted for his work in linguistics, particularly on the phonological consequences of grammaticalization and lexicalization. His doctoral dissertation at Peking University in 2004 was entitled, Northern Yu Dialects and Chinese Morphonology, and in 2011 he wrote Correlation between Syllable and Meaning and Between Phonology and Lexicalization, Grammaticalization and Subjectification: Towards a Theory on Morphophonology From Northern Yu Chinese Dialects.

Chen's work emphasizes the typological differences between monosyllabic languages (with an obligatory match between syllable and morpheme, with exceptions of loanwords or morphological derivations such as reduplicatives, diminutives and other morphological alternations) and non-monosyllabic languages (including disyllabic Austronesian languages, Semito-Hamitic languages with tri-consonantal word roots, Indo-European languages without an obligatory match between sound units (syllables) and meaning units (morpheme or word, despite an assumed majority of monosyllabic, reconstructed word stems and roots in the Proto-Indo-European hypothesis), a difference initiated by German linguist Wilhelm von Humboldt (who put the Sino-Tibetan languages in sharp contrast to other languages in linguistic relativity.

== Works ==
- 《豫北方言和汉语的变音》 [Northern Yu Dialects and Chinese Morphonology]. Doctoral dissertation. 2004.
- 《音节与意义曁音系与词汇化、语法化、主观化的关联 : 豫北方言变音的理论研究》 [Correlation between Syllable and Meaning and Between Phonology and Lexicalization, Grammaticalization and Subjectification: Towards a Theory on Morphophonology From Northern Yu Chinese Dialects]. 北京语言大学出版社 Beijing Language and Culture University Press. 2011. OCLC 862570277.
