= Elizabeth C. Traugott =

American linguist (born 1939)

Elizabeth Closs Traugott (born April 9, 1939 in the UK) is an American linguist and professor emeritus of linguistics and English at Stanford University. She is best known for her work on grammaticalization, subjectification, and constructionalization.

== Education and career ==
Traugott earned her BA in English Language at Oxford University in 1960 and her PhD in English Language at the University of California, Berkeley, in 1964.

Elizabeth Traugott's initial appointment was in the English Department at the University of California, Berkeley (1964–1970). After year-long teaching appointments at the University of Dar es Salaam, Tanzania, and University of York, UK, she was appointed Associate Professor of Linguistics and English at Stanford University in 1970, and Professor from 1977 until her retirement in 2003. She served as Chair of the Department of Linguistics at Stanford University from 1980–1985 and as Vice-Provost and Dean of Graduate Studies from 1985–1991. Elizabeth Traugott received honorary doctorates from Uppsala University (2006) and the University of Helsinki (2010).

She was a pioneer in generative historical syntax. Dissatisfaction with generative models led her to collaborate with Paul Hopper to develop a functional approach to grammaticalization, understood as the change whereby lexical items and constructions come in certain linguistic contexts to serve grammatical functions. More recently she has worked with Graeme Trousdale on constructionalization. Based in construction grammar, constructionalization provides a framework that incorporates several aspects of grammaticalization and lexicalization within a unified theory of how new meaning-new form constructions arise. Other interests include the development of pragmatic markers, especially those in utterance-final position.

== Awards and distinctions ==
Traugott held a Guggenheim Fellowship in 1983 and a fellowship at the Center for Advanced Study in the Behavioral Sciences at Stanford University in 1983–84. She was president of the International Society for Historical Linguistics (ISHL) in 1979, of the Linguistic Society of America (LSA) in 1987, and of the International Society for the Linguistics of English (ISLE) in 2007–2008. She is currently an International Fellow of the British Academy, a Fellow of the Linguistic Society of America and Fellow of the American Association for the Advancement of Science (AAAS). In 2019 she was awarded the John J. Gumperz Lifetime Achievement Award by the International Pragmatics Association (IPrA).

Her papers are archived by the School of Advanced Study, University of London.

== Selected books ==
- 1972: A History of English Syntax. New York: Holt, Rinehart, and Winston.
- 1980: (with Mary L. Pratt) Linguistics for Students of Literature. New York: Harcourt Brace Jovanovich, Inc.
- 1986: (edited with Alice ter Meulen, Judith Snitzer Reilly, and Charles A. Ferguson) On Conditionals. Cambridge University Press.
- 1991: (edited with Bernd Heine) Approaches to Grammaticalization, 2 volumes. Amsterdam: Benjamins.
- 1993: (with Paul Hopper) Grammaticalization. Cambridge University Press.
  - 2003: revised 2nd edition
- 2002: (with Richard B. Dasher) Regularity in Semantic Change. Cambridge University Press.
- 2005: (with Laurel J. Brinton) Lexicalization and Language Change. Cambridge University Press.
- 2010: (edited with Graeme Trousdale) Gradience, Gradualness and Grammaticalization. Amsterdam: Benjamins.
- 2012: (edited with Terttu Nevalainen) The Oxford Handbook of the History of English. New York: Oxford University Press.
- 2013: (with Graeme Trousdale) Constructionalization and Constructional Changes. Oxford University Press.
