= Silent letter =

Letter that is not pronounced

In an alphabetic writing system, a silent letter is a letter that, in a particular word, does not correspond to any sound in the word's pronunciation. In linguistics, a silent letter is often symbolised with a null sign U+2205 ∅ EMPTY SET, which resembles the Scandinavian letter Ø. A null or zero is an unpronounced or unwritten segment.

== English ==
One of the noted difficulties of English spelling is a high number of silent letters. Edward Carney distinguishes different kinds of "silent" letters, which present differing degrees of difficulty to readers.

- Auxiliary letters which, with another letter, constitute digraphs; i.e., two letters combined which represent a single phoneme. These may further be categorized as:
  - "Exocentric" digraphs, where the sound of the digraph is different from that of either of its constituent letters. These are rarely considered "silent". Examples:
    - Where the phoneme has no standard single-letter representation, as with consonants ⟨ng⟩ for /ŋ/ as in sing, ⟨th⟩ for /θ/ as in thin or /ð/ as in then, or diphthongs ⟨ou⟩ in out or ⟨oi⟩ in point. These are the default spellings for the relevant sounds and present no special difficulty for readers or writers.
    - Where standard single-letter representation uses another letter, as with ⟨gh⟩ in enough or ⟨ph⟩ in physical instead of ⟨f⟩. These may be considered irregular for writers, but less difficult for readers.
  - "Endocentric" digraphs, where the sound of the digraph is the same as that of one of its constituent letters. These include:
    - Most double consonants, as ⟨bb⟩ in clubbed; though not geminate consonants, as ⟨ss⟩ in misspell. Doubling due to suffixation or inflection is regular; otherwise, it may present difficulty to writers (e.g., accommodate is often misspelled), but not to readers.
    - Many vowel digraphs, as ⟨ea⟩, ⟨ie⟩, ⟨eu⟩ in leave (cf. accede), achieve, eulogy (cf. utopia).
    - The discontiguous digraphs, whose second element is "magic e"; e.g., ⟨a_e⟩ in rate (cf. rat), ⟨i_e⟩ in fine (cf. fin). This is the regular way to represent "long" vowels in the last syllable of a morpheme.
    - Others, such as ⟨ck⟩ (which is in effect the "doubled" form of ⟨k⟩), ⟨gu⟩ as in guard, vogue; ⟨ea⟩ as in bread, heavy, etc.; ⟨ae⟩, ⟨oe⟩ as in aerial, oedipal. These may be difficult for writers and sometimes also for readers.
- Dummy letters with no relation to neighboring letters and no correspondence in pronunciation:
  - Some are inert letters, which are sounded in a cognate word; e.g., ⟨n⟩ in damn (cf. damnation); ⟨g⟩ in phlegm (cf. phlegmatic); the second ⟨a⟩ in practically (cf. practical); ⟨t⟩ in ballet (cf. balletic); ⟨b⟩ in subtle (cf. subtility). If the cognate is obvious, it may aid writers in spelling, but mislead readers in pronunciation.
  - The rest are empty letters, which never have a sound; e.g., ⟨b⟩ in doubt, ⟨h⟩ in honor, ⟨w⟩ in answer, ⟨h⟩ in Sarah, ⟨s⟩ in island. These may present the greatest difficulty to writers and often to readers, as well.

The distinction between "endocentric" digraphs and empty letters is somewhat arbitrary. For example, in such words as little and bottle, one might view ⟨le⟩ as an "endocentric" digraph for /əl/, or view ⟨e⟩ as an empty letter; similarly, with ⟨bu⟩ or ⟨u⟩ in buy and build.

Not all silent letters are completely redundant:

- Silent letters can distinguish between homophones; e.g., in/inn; be/bee; lent/leant. This is an aid to readers already familiar with both words.
- Silent letters may give an insight into the meaning or origin of a word; e.g., vineyard suggests vines more than the phonetic *vinyard would.
- Silent letters may help the reader to stress the correct syllable (compare physics to physiques). The final ⟨fe⟩ in giraffe gives a clue to the second-syllable stress, where *giraf might suggest initial-stress.

Silent letters arise in several ways:

- Sound changes occurring without a spelling change. The digraph ⟨gh⟩ was pronounced [x] in Middle English in such words as light.
- Sound distinctions from foreign languages may be lost, as with the distinction between smooth rho (ρ) and roughly aspirated rho (ῥ) in Ancient Greek, represented by ⟨r⟩ and ⟨rh⟩ in Latin, but merged to the same /r/ in English.
- Clusters of consonants may be simplified, producing silent letters; e.g., silent ⟨th⟩ in asthma, silent ⟨t⟩ in Christmas (in conservative RP, it is pronounced /krɪstməs/, as opposed to /krɪsməs/ in all other dialects). Similarly, with alien clusters, such as Greek initial ⟨ps⟩ in psychology and ⟨mn⟩ in mnemonic, and the much rarer clusters in chthonic and phthalate.
- Compound words are often simplified in pronunciation, while their spelling remains the same. For example, cupboard and breakfast were once pronounced as written, but were then simplified over time. The words forehead and waistcoat have largely reverted to their spelling pronunciations, but were once pronounced *forrid and *weskit, respectively.
- Occasionally, spurious letters are consciously inserted in spelling to reflect etymology (real or imagined). The ⟨b⟩ in debt and doubt (from French dette, doute) was inserted to match Latin cognates like debit and dubitable. A silent ⟨s⟩ was inserted in isle (Norman French ile, Old French isle, from Latin insula; cognate to isolate) and then extended to the Germanic word island since they were mistakenly thought to be related. Same thing happened with ptarmigan, with a silent ⟨p⟩, being thought it was related to the Greek word pteron ('wing').

Since accent and pronunciation differ, letters may be silent for some speakers, but not others. In non-rhotic accents, ⟨r⟩ is silent in such words as hard, feathered; in h-dropping accents, ⟨h⟩ is silent. A speaker may or may not pronounce ⟨t⟩ in often, the first ⟨c⟩ in Antarctic, ⟨d⟩ in sandwich, etc.

=== Differences between British English and American English ===
==== Pronunciation ====
In the US, the h in herb is silent (an herb), but in the UK, it is pronounced (a herb). The same is true for the l in solder.

In parts of the UK, the a in dictionary and secretary is silent, but in the US, it is pronounced.

==== Spelling ====
In US spellings, silent letters are sometimes omitted (e.g., acknowledgment / UK acknowledgement, ax / UK axe, catalog / UK catalogue, program / UK programme outside computer contexts), but not always (e.g., dialogue is the standard spelling in the US and the UK; dialog is regarded as a US variant; the spelling axe is also often used in the US). In most words, silent letters are written in both styles (e.g., debt, guard, house).

== Other Germanic languages ==
=== Danish ===
The Danish language has different letters that can be silent:

- The letter ⟨f⟩ is silent in the preposition af ('by, of, from, off, with, out of').
- The letter ⟨g⟩ is silent in the conjunction og ('and') and adverb også ('also').
- The letter ⟨h⟩ is silent in most dialects if followed by ⟨v⟩, as in the pronouns hvad ('what'), hvem ('who'), hvor ('where').
- The letter ⟨v⟩ is silent at the end of words if preceded by ⟨l⟩, as in the pronoun selv ('self') and adjective halv ('half').
- The letter ⟨d⟩ is usually (but not necessarily) silent if preceded by a consonant, as in en mand ('a man') and blind ('blind'). Many words ending in ⟨d⟩ are pronounced with a stød, but it is still considered a silent letter.

=== Faroese ===
The Faroese language has two silent letters.

The letter edd ⟨ð⟩ is almost always silent. It is rendered in orthography for historical reasons (e.g., faðir 'father' [ˈfɛajɪɹ], cf. Old Norse faðir). In some cases, however, the letter edd is pronounced [ɡ̊], as in veðrið 'the weather' [ˈvɛɡ̊ʐɪ].

The letter ge ⟨g⟩ (i.e. continuant of Old Norse [ɣ]) is usually silent between vowels or when following a vowel before a pause (e.g., dagur 'day' [ˈd̥ɛavʊɹ], cf. Old Norse dagr [ˈdaɣʐ]; eg 'I' [ˈeː], cf. Old Norse ek). Use of the silent letter ge in Faroese is the same as for the letter edd; it is written for historical reasons as Faroese orthography was based on normalised spelling of Old Norse and Icelandic language.

Both Faroese silent letters edd and ge are replaced by a hiatus glide consonant ([j], [v] or [w]) when followed by another (unstressed) vowel.

=== German ===
In German, silent letters are rare apart from word-internal ⟨h⟩ (following a vowel) and the ⟨e⟩ in the digraph ⟨ie⟩.

==== ⟨h⟩ ====
Silent h is used in German to indicate vowel length or hiatus. This h is almost regularly added at the end of inflectable word stems, e.g. Kuh (cow), Stroh (straw), drehen (to turn, stem dreh-). There is only a fairly small number of exceptions to this, mostly nouns in -ee or -ie (see below), apart from isolated cases such as säen (to sow).

Otherwise silent h may be written before the letters l, m, n, r as in nehmen (to take), Stuhl (chair), Zahn (tooth). This latter use is highly irregular, however, and there are just as many words where the h is missing.

Historically, this use of silent h goes back to the Middle High German consonant /h/, which became silent in words like sehen (to see), zehn (ten). By analogy it was then also used in words that had no such h in Middle High German. The majority of silent h's in modern German are analogical rather than etymological.

==== ⟨e⟩ ====
The long i-sound /iː/ is usually written ⟨ie⟩, with a silent ⟨e⟩, as in viel (much), spielen (to play), Wien ('Vienna'), and hundreds of other words.

In native German words this spelling is fairly unambiguous. Some words of foreign origin also behave like native words; e.g., Kurier, Papier, Turnier and all verbs ending in ⟨-ieren⟩ (e.g. appellieren, organisieren). In other foreign words, however, the ⟨e⟩ after ⟨i⟩ may be pronounced (e.g., Ambiente, Hygiene, Klient), or names like Daniela, Gabriel, and Triest.

Words ending in ⟨-ie⟩ can be particularly tricky to learners: There are generally two possibilities:

1. When the final ⟨ie⟩ is stressed, it represents long /iː/ as in Zeremonie [tseʁemoˈniː]. Some other words with ⟨ie⟩ pronounced this way include Akademie, Allergie, Amnesie, Amnestie, Apathie, Artillerie, Batterie, Blasphemie, Chemie, Chirurgie, Demokratie, Energie, Epidemie, -gamie, Garantie, Genie, Geometrie, -grafie/-graphie, Harmonie, Hysterie, Infanterie, Ironie, Kavallerie, Kompanie, Kopie, -logie, Liturgie, Magie, Manie, Marie, Melodie, Monotonie, Nostalgie, Orthopädie, Partie, Phantasie, Philosophie, Poesie, Psychiatrie, Rhapsodie, Sinfonie, -skopie, Theorie, Therapie, and Utopie.
2. When the preceding vowel is stressed, ⟨ie⟩ represents the separate vowels /i.ə/ as in Folie /ˈfoːliə/. Some other words with ⟨ie⟩ pronounced this way include Akazie, Aktie, Amalie, Begonie, Emilie, Familie, Folie, Geranie, Grazie, Hortensie, Hostie, Immobilie, Kastanie, Komödie, Kurie, Lilie, Linie, Orgie, Otilie, Pinie, Serie, Studie, Tragödie, and Zäzilie.
3. In female names, there is a third category of words stressed on the antepenult, where ⟨ie⟩ also represents /iː/; e.g., Amelie, Leonie, Nathalie, Rosalie, Stefanie, Valerie (all stressed on the first syllable).

A special case arises when the ⟨e⟩ after ⟨i⟩ is a grammatical ending; in this case, it is always pronounced. Therefore, Zeremonie becomes Zeremonien [tseʁemoˈniːən] in the plural, and the same is true of all other nouns in group 1 above. The noun Knie is pronounced [kniː] when it is singular, but usually [ˈkniːə] when it is plural. Spermien is plural of Spermium, hence also with a pronounced ⟨e⟩. Country names in -ien can also be joined to this group: Australien, Brasilien, Indien, Kroatien, Serbien, Slowenien.

==== Other letters ====
Other silent letters occur mainly in borrowings from French and other modern languages; e.g., Porträt (portrait), Korps (corps).

Informally, the letter ⟨t⟩ may be silent in function words like ist (is), jetzt (now), nicht (not), and otherwise in clusters like Gedächtnis (memory), Kunststück (piece of art). These t's are commonly silent in everyday speech, but will be retained in careful, formal parlance.

Two other cases of potentially silent letters are regionally restricted: Speakers from northern and central Germany commonly do not pronounce the ⟨p⟩ in stem-initial ⟨pf⟩ and in ⟨mpf⟩, e.g., pflegen, kämpfen. In various regions, ⟨r⟩ may be silent when following ⟨a⟩ in the syllable coda, e.g. Fahrt, Karte. Compare German phonology.

== Romance languages ==
=== Catalan ===
In Standard Catalan, the letter ⟨i⟩ is silent in several words (e.g. caixa is pronounced as Catalan pronunciation: [ˈkaʃə]).

==== Valencian ====
In the suffix -itzar and their derivatives, the letter ⟨t⟩ is completely silent. (e.g. utilització is pronounced as Valencian pronunciation: [utilizasiˈo], compare Standard Catalan Catalan pronunciation: [utilid͡zəsiˈo])

=== French ===
Silent letters are common in French, including the last letter of most words. Ignoring auxiliary letters that create digraphs (such as ⟨ch⟩, ⟨gn⟩, ⟨ph⟩, ⟨au⟩, ⟨eu⟩, ⟨ei⟩, and ⟨ou⟩, as well as ⟨m⟩ and ⟨n⟩ as signals for nasalized vowels), they include almost every possible letter except ⟨j⟩ and ⟨v⟩.

==== Vowels ====
Final ⟨e⟩ is silent or at least (in poetry and song) a nearly-silent schwa /ə/; it allows the preservation of a preceding consonant, often allowing the preservation of a grammatical distinction between masculine and feminine forms in writing; e.g., in vert and verte (both 'green'); the ⟨t⟩ is pronounced in the latter (feminine) but not the former. Furthermore, the schwa can prevent an awkward ending of a word ending in a consonant and a liquid (peuple, sucre).

After ⟨é⟩, ⟨i⟩, or ⟨u⟩, a final ⟨e⟩ is silent. The spelling ⟨eau⟩ is pronounced just the same as that for ⟨au⟩ and is entirely an etymological distinction, so in that context, the ⟨e⟩ is silent.

The digraph ⟨qu⟩ for /k/ usually has a silent ⟨u⟩, as in quand ('when'), quel ('which'), acquérir ('to acquire'), and quotidien ('daily'). ⟨gu⟩ for /ɡ/ has the same silent ⟨u⟩; when the ⟨u⟩ is not silent, it is usually marked with a trema: ⟨ü⟩.

==== Consonants ====
⟨h⟩ is silent outside of the digraph ⟨ch⟩. Numerous doubled consonants exist; French does not distinguish doubled consonants from single consonants in pronunciation as Italian does. A marked distinction exists between a single and doubled ⟨s⟩: doubled ⟨ss⟩ is always voiceless [s], while an intervocalic single ⟨s⟩ is usually voiced [z].

The nasal consonants ⟨m⟩ and ⟨n⟩ when final or preceding a consonant ordinarily nasalize a preceding vowel but are not themselves pronounced (faim, tomber, vin, vendre). Initial and intervocalic ⟨m⟩ and ⟨n⟩, even before a final silent ⟨e⟩, are pronounced: aimer, jaune.

Most final consonants are silent, except in most cases with the letters ⟨c⟩, ⟨f⟩, ⟨l⟩, and ⟨r⟩ (the English word careful is a mnemonic for this set). But even this rule has its exceptions: final morphemic ⟨er⟩ is usually pronounced /e/ (=⟨é⟩) rather than the expected /ɛʁ/ (as in hiver, which does not have that morpheme). Final ⟨l⟩ and ⟨ll⟩ is silent after ⟨i⟩ even in a diphthong (œil, appareil, travail, bouillir). Final -ent is silent as a third-person plural verb ending, though it is pronounced in other cases.

Final consonants that might be silent in other contexts (finally or before another consonant) may seem to reappear in pronunciation in liaison: ils ont [ilz‿ɔ̃] "they have", as opposed to ils sont [il sɔ̃] "they are"; liaison is the retention (between words in certain syntactic relationships) of a historical sound otherwise lost, and often has grammatical or lexical significance.

=== Italian ===
The letter ⟨h⟩ most often marks a ⟨c⟩/⟨g⟩ as hard (velar), as in spaghetti and scherzo, where it would otherwise be soft (palatal), as in gelato and violoncello, because of a following front vowel (⟨e⟩ or ⟨i⟩).

Conversely, to soften ⟨c⟩ or ⟨g⟩ (to /tʃ/ or /dʒ/ respectively) before a back vowel (⟨a⟩, ⟨o⟩, ⟨u⟩), a silent ⟨i⟩ is inserted: ⟨–cio–⟩, ⟨–giu–⟩, etc. When ⟨i⟩ in that position is not silent, it can be marked with a grave accent: ⟨ì⟩. Before any other letter, or at the end of a word, the ⟨i⟩ is not silent.

Silent ⟨h⟩ is also used in forms of the verb avere ('have') – ho, hai and hanno – to distinguish these from their homophones o ('or'), ai ('to the') and anno ('year'). The letter ⟨h⟩ is also silent at the beginning of words borrowed from other languages, such as hotel.

=== Portuguese ===
European Portuguese's orthography used to conserve the etymological silent letters ⟨c⟩ and ⟨p⟩ when they appeared after a vowel and before the consonants ⟨t⟩, ⟨ç⟩ or soft ⟨c⟩. Their purpose was to prevent the preceding vowel's deafening, compare adoptar [ɐdoˈtaɾ] (adopt), contracção [kõtɾaˈsɐ̃w] (contraction) and inspeccionar [ĩʃpesiuˈnaɾ] (inspect) to adjacente [ɐdʒɐˈsẽtɨ] (adjacent), completar [kõpɫɨˈtaɾ] (complete) and noção [nuˈsɐ̃w] (noction). However, the latest Portuguese orthographic reform removed them from the language entirely, meaning that enlarged vowels and deafened vowels cannot be distinguished solely by spelling anymore, the main reason for this change was that Brazilian Portuguese's spelling had already stopped writing these mute consonants, and thus they were a figure of divergence between the two countries' way of writing.

Current Portuguese still has some mute letters:

==== Vowels ====
The ⟨u⟩ in the digraph ⟨gu⟩ is not pronounced before ⟨e⟩ and ⟨i⟩, it is there because a single ⟨g⟩ before these vowels becomes a /ʒ/. There are exceptions to this rule, though, like the words aguentar and arguição.

The ⟨u⟩ in the digraph ⟨qu⟩, the latter is pronounced as /k/ or as /kʷ/, is not pronounced before ⟨e⟩ and ⟨i⟩, it is the only traditional way of putting a /k/ sound before these letters, as the letter ⟨c⟩ softens to /s/ and ⟨k⟩ is reserved to loanwords. There are exceptions to this rule, though, like the words eloquente and tranquilo.

The ⟨u⟩ in the diphthong ⟨ou⟩ is not generally pronounced in Standard Lisbon Portuguese and some Brazilian dialects, which results in words like Sousa and Gouveia being said as "Sosa" and "Goveia" respectively.

==== Consonants ====
⟨h⟩ is always silent at the beginning and at the ending of words (hoje, hora, ah!, etc.), except in loanwords such as hobby. However, ⟨h⟩ is present in three digraphs and one trigraph (ch, lh, nh and tch), which is where this letter is mainly found affecting the word's pronunciation.

⟨m⟩ and ⟨n⟩ are nasal consonants, when at the end of a word or behind another consonant, they nasalize the preceding vowel, with this being the most common way of encountering nasal vowels in Portuguese, the other being with the tilde. They are not interchangeable, though, ⟨m⟩ is only used before ⟨b⟩ and ⟨p⟩ (embora, império, etc.) while ⟨n⟩ is used everywhere else (canto, circunstância, convencer, ênfase, fundo, lançar, etc.). Other difference between these two letters is that paroxytones ending with an ⟨em⟩ are not accentuated while oxytones have to be accented, (coragem, também, etc.), but the opposite happens with ⟨en⟩ (pólen, nenen, etc.), all proparoxytones are accentuated in Portuguese.

⟨x⟩ is normally deemed as silent when behind a soft ⟨c⟩ or the letter ⟨s⟩, like in the words excelência, excisar or exsudar, but some people consider ⟨xc⟩ and ⟨xs⟩ to just be digraphs.

There is an extremely specific and limited group of words whose mute consonants can currently be preserved, but only when they occur at the end of them, these are onomastic forms in which the usage has consecrated them, namely anthroponyms and toponyms of biblical tradition like Jacob, Job, Isaac, David, Gad, Gog, Magog and Josafat. Some others names, like Madrid, Valhadolid, Calecut and Calicut also apply to this rule. Although, all of the anthroponyms cited here can also be optionally written without them: Jacó, Jó, Davi, etc.

=== Spanish ===
Despite being rather phonemic, Spanish orthography retains some silent letters:

- ⟨h⟩ is silent outside of the digraph ⟨ch⟩ and loanwords such as hámster or hachís.
- The digraph ⟨qu⟩, used to represent [k] before the front vowels ⟨e⟩ and ⟨i⟩, has a silent ⟨u⟩. In contrast, the u is pronounced in ⟨cu⟩.
- ⟨gu⟩ for /ɡ/ has the same silent ⟨u⟩ before ⟨e⟩ and ⟨i⟩. When the ⟨u⟩ is not silent, it must be marked with a trema: ⟨ü⟩. Before ⟨a⟩ and ⟨o⟩, the ⟨u⟩ is not silent.
- Syllable onsets like ⟨pn⟩, ⟨ps⟩, ⟨pt⟩ are usually pronounced without p. In some but not all cases, this is reflected in the orthography that allows double forms with and without ⟨p⟩: neumático ("tire"), psicología/sicología ("psychology"), pterodáctilo/terodáctilo ("pterodactyl"). Reducing an internal ⟨pt⟩ (*conceto instead of concepto, "concept") is not recommended except in septiembre/setiembre ("September") and séptimo/sétimo ("seventh").
- An internal ⟨bs⟩ may be pronounced with a silent ⟨b⟩. In some cases, this is considered vulgar; in others, it is the most common pronunciation and reflected in the orthography: sustancia/substancia ("substance").
- Intervocalic or final ⟨d⟩ can be weakly pronounced or silent depending on formality and dialect, or in relaxed speech: Madrid [maˈðɾi], cansado [kanˈsao] ("tired").
- In some dialects, such as Andalucian, Caribbean, or Chilean, an "s" in a terminal position is often aspirated, and may be silent in rapid speech.

== Greek ==
In Greek, the comma also functions as a silent letter in a handful of words in Byzantine Greek, principally (and in Modern Greek, only) distinguishing ό,τι (ó,ti, "whatever") from ότι (óti, "that").

== Slavic languages ==
=== Czech ===
In the vast majority of cases, Czech pronunciation follows the spelling. There are only four exceptions:

D

For example: dcera (daughter) and in srdce (heart)

==== /j/ + consonant clusters in some words ====
In most present forms of the verb být ("to be"), namely jsem, jsi, jsme, jste and jsou (i.e., all persons but the third-person singular je), the initial cluster /js/ is regularly simplified to a mere /s/. This pronunciation is considered correct and neutral when the verb is unstressed and used as an auxiliary. When stressed or used lexically, only the full /js/ pronunciation is considered correct. In casual speech, however, a few other highly frequent words commonly undergo similar simplification, namely all present forms of jít ("to walk") beginning with /jd/ (that is jdu, jdeš, jde, jdeme, jdete, jdou), and the noun jméno ("name") (as well as the derived verb jmenovat (se) 'to name, to (be) call(ed)').

=== Russian ===
Several words in Russian omit written consonants when spoken. For example, "чувствовать" (chuvstvovat') is pronounced [ˈt͡ɕustvəvətʲ] and "солнце" (solntse) is pronounced Russian pronunciation: [ˈsont͡sə].

Russian letter ъ has no phonetic value and functions as a separation sign. Before the spelling reform of 1918, this hard sign was written at the end of each word when following a non-palatal consonant.

=== Ukrainian ===
Some three-consonant sequences in Ukrainian omit the second sound; for example, шістнадцять (šistnadcjatj) is pronounced without the first t.

== Semitic languages ==
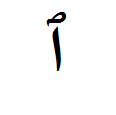
The silent Arabic alif is marked with a wasla sign above it

In Hebrew, almost all cases of silent letters are silent aleph (א). Many words that have a silent aleph in Hebrew have an equivalent word in the Arabic language, that is written with a mater lectionis alif (ا), a letter that indicates the long vowel "aa". Examples:

- The Hebrew word for "no" is לֹא ([lo] LOH) and the Arabic word for "no" is لاَ ([laː] LAH).
- The Hebrew word for "left side" is שְׂמֹאל ([smol] SMOHL) and an Arabic word for "left side" is شِمَال ([ʃiˈmaːl]) shee-MAHL).
- The Hebrew word for "head" is רֹאשׁ ([ʁoʃ] ROHSH) and the Arabic word for "head" is رَأس ([raʔs] RAS).

The explanation for this phenomenon is that the Hebrew language had a sound change of all the mater lectionis aleph letters into silent ones (see Canaanite shift). Due to that sound change, in Hebrew language, there are only two kinds of aleph – the glottal stop /ʔ/ and the silent one – while in Arabic language all three kinds still exist.

The silent Arabic alif is marked with a wasla sign above it (see picture), in order to differentiate it from the other kinds of alifs. An Arabic alif turns silent, if it fulfills three conditions: it must be in a beginning of a word, the word must not be the first one of the sentence, and the word must belong to one of the following groups:

- Verbs that start with the prefix "ʔi-", due to their conjugation and derived stem.
- Ten specific nouns that begin with "ʔ": اسم, است, ابن/ابنة, اثنان/اثنتان, امرؤ/امرأة, اَيمن الله/اَيْم الله. Some of these words have a Hebrew word equivalent, and that equivalent had totally lost the beginning aleph. Examples: اسم (ʔism), meaning "a name" (in Maltese the word isem), sounds like "ism" [ɪ.sɪm] if it is in the beginning of the sentence and "sm" if not; its Hebrew equivalent is שֵׁם (shem). إبن (ʔibn) (in Maltese, the word iben), meaning "a son", sounds like "ibn" [ʔib.na] if it is in the beginning of the sentence and "bn" if not; its Hebrew equivalent is בֵּן (ben), in Maltese bin.
- The alif of the word اَل (ʔal), meaning "the", sounds like "al" [ʔaːl] if it is in the beginning of the sentence and "l" if not.

Besides the alif of the Arabic word ال (ʔal, meaning "the"), its lām (the letter L) can also be silent. It becomes silent if the noun that word is related to starts with a "sun letter". A sun letter is a letter that indicates a consonant produced by stopping the air in the front part of the mouth (not including the consonant M). The Hebrew equivalent to the Arabic word ال (ʔal, meaning "the") had totally lost its L.

In Maltese, għ can be silent (e.g., għar 'cave', pronounced "ahr"), or /ħ/ if it is at the end of a word (e.g., qlugħ 'sail').

== Turkish ==
In the Turkish language, ⟨ğ⟩ often has no sound of its own, but lengthens the preceding vowel, for example in dağ ("mountain") [daː]. In other surroundings, it may be pronounced as a glide.

== Persian ==
In Persian, there are two instances of silent letters:

- The letter hē' after a short vowel, unless in a monosyllabic word, has no sound of its own (thus it is called hā-yi maxtafī). It is only written because according to spelling rules a word cannot end in a short vowel.
- The Silent wāw is always written but typically not (except for some, though not all, Afghan Persian dialects) spoken in New Persian. It used to represent the labialization of the voiceless velar fricative, which typically either no longer exists in most of the modern standard dialects (or gets converted into a full-fledged /w/), making it an archaic remnant of the mostly-old standards of pronunciation.

== Indic languages ==
Unconventional to the Apabhraṃśas-Apabhraṣṭas, Prakrit, Sanskrit, Proto-Indo-Aryan, Proto-Indo-Iranian and Proto-Indo-European root languages, some Indic languages have silent letters. Among Dravidian languages, Tamil and Malayalam have certain distinct styles of keeping few of their letters silent. Among the Indo-Aryan languages, only Bengali–Assamese macrolanguage (including, but not limited to Bengali and Assamese) has silent letters.

=== Dravidian languages ===
==== Tamil ====
Tamil is a classical language phonetically characterized by allophones, approximants, nasals and glottalised sounds. Some words, however, have silent letters in them. The words அஃது (while that is), and அஃதன் (that) contain the Āytam or 'ஃ', which is not pronounced in Modern Tamil. It is explained in the Tolkāppiyam that āytam could have glottalised the sounds it was combined with, though some may argue it sounded more like the Arabic 'خ' (/x/). That being said, modern words like ஆஃபிஸ் (Office) use 'ஃ' and 'ப' in sequence to represent the /f/ sounds, as the āytam is nowadays also used to transcribe it and other foreign phonemes.

Another convention in Middle Tamil (Sen-Tamil) is the use of silent vowels to address a mark of respect when beginning proper nouns. The Ramayana was one such text where the word Ramayana in Tamil always began with 'இ', as in இராமாயணம் (/ɾɑːmɑːjʌɳʌm/), though it was not pronounced. The name கோபாலன் (/ɡoːbɑːlʌɳ/) was so written as உகோபாலன் prefixed with an 'உ'.

==== Malayalam ====
Inheriting elision, approximants and allophones from Tamil, in Malayalam, except for Sanskrit words, words ending in the vowel 'ഉ' (/u/) become silent at the end and if not compounded with words succeeding them, replace the 'ഉ' vowel by the schwa /ə/. However, it is considered disrespectful to change this pronunciation in the simple present verbs, when using imperatives and using what can be termed as Imperative-Active voice in Malayalam, where the second person is respectfully addressed with his or her name instead of നീ (/n̪i:/, you) or നിങ്ങൽ (/n̪iŋaɭ/, yourselves). For example, in the sentence, രാകേശ് പണി തീർക്കു (/ɾʲaːkeːɕə paɳi ti:ɾʲku/, Rakesh, finish your work), the use of the second personal pronoun is avoided with the name രാകേശ് (/ɾʲaːkeːɕ/, Rakesh), but this sentence sounds less respectful if the 'ഉ' in തീർക്കു (/ti:ɾʲku/, finish} is replaced by the schwa or /ə/, as in "തീർക്കു!" (/ti:ɾʲkə/, Finish!) which sounds like an order. Notice the /ə/ at the end of the name Rakesh which is pronounced after being added to the Sanskritic name.

=== Indo-Aryan languages ===
==== Bengali ====
Unlike other Indic languages, Bengali features silent consonants, which occur in many consonant clusters. These silent letters usually occur in loanwords borrowed from Sanskrit, whose spelling has been preserved while their pronunciation has changed with sound mergers.

The letter ব ('b') is silent in most of the consonant clusters where it occurs as the second one. For example, স্বপ্ন (স্ব = স্ 'sh' + ব) (dream) is written as "shbôpno" but pronounced as "shôpno". জ্বর (জ্ব = জ্ 'j' + ব) (fever) is written as "jbôr" but pronounced as "jôr". This is the case with consonant clusters at the beginning of the words. If the consonant cluster occurs in the middle or at the end of a word, the ব serves as a marker to put stress on the first consonant in a consonant cluster. For example, বিশ্বাস (শ্ব = শ্ 'sh' + ব) (to believe) is written as " bishbāsh" but pronounced as "bishāsh" with more stress on the sh than usual, which sounds like "bishshāsh".

The letter ম ('m') also remains silent in many initial consonant clusters. For example, "স্মৃতি" (স্মৃ = স্ 's' + ম + ঋ 'ri') (memory) is written as "smriti" but pronounced as "sriti". In many cases, if the consonant cluster occurs in the middle of a word, then the preceding vowel should be nasalised and the first letter in the cluster is stressed and ম in the cluster is silent. For example, আত্মা (ত্মা = ত্ 't' + মা 'mā'), i.e., "ātmā" (soul), is pronounced as "āttā" and the ā is nasalised.

The letter য় ('y') is also silent in many cases as in "মেয়ে" (য়ে = য় + এ 'ē') (girl) is written as "mēyē" but pronounced as "mē".

The letter 'য' ('j') in its consonant clusters changes the pronunciation of the other letters in the cluster. For example, ন্যায় (ন্যা = ন 'n'+ য + আ 'ā') (justice) is written as "njāy" but pronounced as "nay" (a as in hat); কন্যা (girl or daughter) is written as "konjā" but pronounced as "konnā". Sometimes it is completely silent as in সন্ধ্যা (ন্ধ্যা = ন্ 'n' + ধ 'dh' + য + আ 'ā') (evening) is written as "shondhjā" but pronounced as "shondhā".

Moreover, Bengali also features schwa deletion common to many other Indo-Aryan languages, where the schwa, 'o' or 'ô' is omitted while pronunciation, for example, কাকতলা (incident) is written as "kākotôlā" but pronounced as "kāktôlā".

Similarly, in many other consonant clusters, the second consonant is silent. (e.g. ক্ষতি is written as "kshoti" but is pronounced as "khoti" and the /ʃ/ (previously /ʂ/) is debuccalized.)

== Zhuang-Tai languages ==
=== Thai ===
Thai has a deep orthography like English and French. Unlike the two languages, however, the Thai script is an abugida rather than a true alphabet. Nonetheless, silent consonants, vowels, and even syllables are common in Thai. Thai has many loanwords from Sanskrit and Pali, and rather than spell aforementioned words according to Thai phonics, the script tends to maintain the etymological spellings. For example, a romanization of the word ประโยชน์ that reflects Thai orthography is prayochṅ, but it would be pronounced as prayot, where the extra letter for -n is completely silent. Another example is the Thai word มนตร์, which is sometimes written as mantra like it would be in Sanskrit, but it is only pronounced mon in Thai. Though the second syllable is pronounced in Sanskrit, it is completely absent when pronouncing the word in Thai. In such words, the diacritic ◌์, known as thanthakhat (Thai: ทัณฑฆาต), is used to mark silent letters.

Also, different letters can be used for the same sound (for example, [tʰ] can be spelled as ฐ, ฑ, ฒ, ถ, ท, or ธ) depending on which class the consonant is, which is important for knowing which tone the syllable will have, and whether or not it is a loanword from Sanskrit or Pali. However, some letters written before low class consonants become silent and turn the low class syllable into a high class one. For example, even though the high class letter ho hip ห is used to write the sound /h/, if the letter comes before a low class letter in a syllable, the letter will become ho nam, which will make the letter silent and it will turn the syllable into a high class syllable. For example, the word นา is a low class syllable because its initial consonant is a low class consonant. The syllable is pronounced /nā:/ (with a long vowel and mid tone) and it means "field". However, the word หนา is a high class syllable, despite it containing a low class consonant in the onset. The syllable is pronounced /nǎ:/ (with a long vowel and a rising tone) and it means "thick".

=== Lao ===
Like Thai, Lao also has a letter that becomes silent if it comes before a low class consonant. The letter is ho sung ຫ, which would represent the sound /h/ if it were not paired with another low class consonant. However, unlike Thai, the digraphs beginning with the aforementioned letter can sometimes be written as a ligature.

=== Zhuang ===
In the standard Zhuang language, written in the Latin script, the last letter of every syllable is typically silent due to it representing the tone of the syllable. The digraphs mb and nd also have silent letters, representing the phonemes ɓ and ɗ respectively.

== Korean ==
In the Hangul Orthography of the Korean language, the letter ⟨ㅇ⟩ is silent when written in the syllable-initial position, and represents the sound /ŋ/ when written in the syllable-final position. For example, in the word 안녕 (Yale Romanization: annyeng) (meaning "hello"), composed of the letters "ㅇㅏㄴㄴㅕㅇ", the first ⟨ㅇ⟩ is silent, and the last ⟨ㅇ⟩ is pronounced as /ŋ/. The reason for this can be found in 15th-century Hangul orthography. In the 15th century, the letter ⟨ㅇ⟩ originally represented /∅~ɣ/ (a lenited form of ㄱ /k/), while the letter ⟨ㆁ⟩ unconditionally represented /ŋ/. But because in Middle Korean phonology, ⟨ㆁ⟩ was not allowed in syllable-initial position, and ⟨ㅇ⟩ was not allowed in syllable-final position, it formed a complementary distribution of the two letters. Because of this and the great similarity of appearance, the two letters merged.

Korean's syllable structure is CGVC, and Korean's writing system, Hangul, reflects this structure. The only possible consonant cluster in a single syllable must contain a glide and they must occur in the onset. However, sometimes a cluster of two consonants are written after the vowel in a syllable. In such situations, if the next syllable begins with a vowel sound, then the second consonant becomes the first sound of the next syllable. However, if the next syllable begins with a consonant sound, then one of the consonants in the cluster will be silent (sometimes causing fortition in the following consonant). For example, the word 얇다 (meaning "thin") is written as (Yale: yalp.ta), but the word is pronounced as if it was written yal.tta because the second syllable begins with a consonant sound. However, the word 얇아서 (also meaning "thin") is written as (Yale: yalp.a.se) and it is pronounced as yal.pa.se because the second syllable begins with a vowel sound.

== Mongolian ==
=== Mongolian script ===
The native Mongolian script has much more orthographic depth than Mongolian Cyrillic. For example, the letter Gh or γ (ᠭ) is silent if it is between two of the same vowel letters. In that case, the silent consonant letter combines to two written vowel into one long vowel. For example, the Mongolian word Qaγan (ᠬᠠᠭᠠᠨ) should be pronounced Qaan (ᠬᠠᠠᠨ). In Mongolian Cyrillic, however, it is spelled хаан (haan), closer to the actual pronunciation of the word. Words in the Mongolian script can also have silent vowels as well. For Mongolian name of the city Hohhot, it is spelled Kökeqota (ᠬᠥᠬᠡᠬᠣᠲᠠ) in Mongolian script, but in Cyrillic, it is spelled Хөх хот (Höh hot), closer towards the actual pronunciation of the word.

=== Mongolian Cyrillic ===
There are also silent letters in Mongolian Cyrillic: Short vowels at the end of words are not usually pronounced, for example, in the verb байна (to be), but can be lengthened for emphasis. They also may affect the pronunciation of the preceding consonant. For instance, a word-final н is pronounced /ŋ/, but becomes /n/ when followed by a short vowel. Thus чоно (meaning "wolf") is pronounced "chon", not "chono" or "chong".

== Basque ==
In Basque, during the 20th century ⟨h⟩ was not used in the orthography of the Basque dialects in Spain but it marked an aspiration in the North-Eastern dialects. During the standardization of Basque in the 1970s, the compromise was reached that ⟨h⟩ would be accepted if it were the first consonant in a syllable. Hence, herri ("people") and etorri ("to come") were accepted instead of erri (Biscayan) and ethorri (Souletin). Speakers could pronounce the h or not. For the dialects lacking the aspiration, this meant a complication added to the standardized spelling.

== See also ==
- Apheresis (linguistics)
- Elision
- Schwa deletion in Indo-Aryan languages, explains rules of Modern Indo-Aryan languages that delete the schwa sound.
- Silent e
- Silent k
- Syncope (phonology)
- Three-letter rule, the source of some common English silent letters.
