= Three-letter rule =

Rule for English words

In English spelling, the three-letter rule, (Note: So named by Michael Alper in 1972.) or short-word rule, is the observation that one- and two-letter words tend to be function words such as I, at, he, if, of, or, etc. As a consequence of the rule, "content words" tend to have at least three letters. In particular, content words containing fewer than three phonemes may be augmented with letters which are phonetically redundant, such as ebb, add, egg, inn, bee, awe, buy, owe, etc. Vivian Cook says of the rule, "People who are told about it are often surprised that they were previously unaware of something so obvious."

== Origin ==
Many content words would be homographs of common function words if not for the latter's "redundant" letters: e.g. be/bee, in/inn, I/eye, to/two. Otto Jespersen suggested the short spelling was a marker of reduced stress. Content words always have at least one stressed syllable, whereas function words are often completely unstressed; shorter spellings help reflect this. (Interjections such as ah, eh, lo, yo are always stressed. Punctuation serves to isolate these elements.)

The short word rule dates from the Early Modern English period. In Old English, inflections increased the length of most content words in any case. Through to the seventeenth century, before English spelling was firmly settled, short forms for some content words did occur, such as eg (egg), ey (eye), lo (low), etc. Conversely, poets alternated between short and long forms for function words, depending on whether they occurred on or off the meter. Some commentators have ascribed such a convention to John Milton, although others suggest that it was unevenly implemented and clouded by intervention from the printer.

== Exceptions ==
While many function words have more than two letters (and, she, were, therefore, etc.), the exceptions to the rule are rather two-letter content words. Only a few of these occur commonly in most texts: the words go (which also has a functional usage in the idiom going to do something), ox and, especially in American texts, ax.

English grammar is relatively flexible about converting words of one class to another, allowing verbal uses such as to up the ante or nominal uses such as the ins and outs. The verb forms be, am, is and do can be considered exceptions when used as lexical verbs, which are content words, though not when used as auxiliary verbs, which are function words.

Many recent loanwords retain spelling from the source language or are romanized according to non-English phonetic conventions. This has resulted in short words such as the notes of the solfège scale (do, re, mi, etc.; (Note: Sarah Ann Glover anglicised some of the spellings: doh, fah, lah.) from Latin via Italian) or the Greek alphabet (pi, nu, etc.) and miscellaneous others such as bo, qi, om, and ka. Carney calls such words "exceptions which prove the rule, clearly marked as exotic by the spelling".

Clipped words introduce more exceptions to the rule: ad (advertisement), za (pizza).
