= Conversational Chinese 301 =

Textbook

- Genre: Textbook
- Publisher: Beijing Language and Culture University Press
- Publication date: 1990

Conversational Chinese 301 is a textbook.published by the Beijing Language and Culture University Press.

It was first published in 1990. Its revised edition, included in the series of "BLCU choice textbook for learners overseas", was published in 1998. Conversational Chinese 301 has several different versions, including versions annotated in English, French, Japanese, and Korean, and the sales of all these versions added up to over 300,000 copies. It is regarded as the most popular Chinese textbooks for foreigners all over the world at present. The third edition of Conversational Chinese 301 is divided into two volumes: Volume 1 and Volume 2. Versions of the third edition annotated in different languages will be published successively to satisfy the various needs of learners of Chinese all over the world.
