= Silent k and g =

Feature of English orthography

In English orthography, the letter ⟨k⟩ normally reflects the pronunciation of [k] and the letter ⟨g⟩ normally is pronounced /ɡ/ or "hard" ⟨g⟩, as in goose, gargoyle and game; /d͡ʒ/ or "soft" ⟨g⟩, generally before ⟨i⟩ or ⟨e⟩, as in giant, ginger and geology; or /ʒ/ in some words of French origin, such as beige and genre. However, silent ⟨k⟩ and ⟨g⟩ occur because of apheresis, the dropping of the initial sound of a word. These sounds used to be pronounced in Old and Middle English.

== Silent (k) ==
The letter ⟨k⟩ is normally silent (i.e. it does not reflect any sound) when it precedes an ⟨n⟩ at the beginning of a word, as in "knife", and sometimes by extension in other positions. Exceptions include the town of Knoebels Grove (/kəˈnoʊbəlz/ kə-NOH-bəlz) located in Pennsylvania in the United States, the Germanic surname Knaus(s) (/kəˈnaʊs/ kə-NOWSS) used by NASCAR crew chief Chad Knaus and words of foreign origin such as Knesset, the name of the Israeli Parliament.

== Silent (g) ==
While not as common, the letter ⟨g⟩ is also usually silent (i.e. it does not reflect any sound) when preceding an ⟨n⟩ at the beginning or end of a word, as in "gnat", "campaign" and "design". In some words borrowed from Romance languages, it may appear within a word, as in "champagne", where it originally denoted the phoneme ŋ.

In addition, the digraph ⟨gh⟩, in the dominant dialects of Modern English, is almost always either silent (as in "bough", "thorough", "furlough", "night" or "weight") or pronounced /f/ (as in "tough", "enough" or "laugh"). It is also occasionally pronounced /ə/, such as in Edinburgh. When ⟨gh⟩ occurs at the beginning of a word, it is pronounced hard (/ɡ/) as in "ghost" and "ghetto".

In a few words of Greek origin, the digraph ⟨gm⟩ is pronounced /m/, with the (g) being silent, such as in "phlegm", "paradigm" and "diaphragm".

== Etymology ==
The ⟨kn⟩ and ⟨gn⟩ letter combinations usually indicate a Germanic origin of the word. In Old English, ⟨k⟩ and ⟨g⟩ were not silent when preceding ⟨n⟩. Cognates in other Germanic languages show that the ⟨k⟩ was probably a voiceless velar plosive in Proto-Germanic. For example, the initial ⟨k⟩ is not silent in words such as German Knecht which is a cognate of knight, Knoten which is a cognate of knot, etc.

Likewise, ⟨g⟩ was probably a voiced velar plosive and the initial ⟨g⟩ was not silent: for example, German Gnom, a cognate of gnome, Gneis, a cognate of gneiss, etc.

== Examples ==
Following is a list of words that include a silent ⟨k⟩ or ⟨g⟩. Plural nouns, as well as compound nouns derived from and containing simple nouns in the list, are ignored. For verbs, only the infinitive form of the verb is given, not any conjugations or derived verbs:

=== ⟨kn⟩ ===
==== Nouns ====
- knack
- knacker
- knackwurst
- knag
- knapsack
- knapweed
- knar
- knave
- knawel
- knee
- kneel
- knell
- knickerbockers
- knickers
- knickknack
- knife
- knight
- knob
- knock
- knoll
- knop
- knosp
- knot
- knout
- knowledge
- knuckle
- knur
- knurl

==== Verbs ====
- beknave
- knap
- knead
- knee
- kneel
- knell
- knight
- knit
- knock
- knot
- know
- knurl

==== Others ====
- knackered
- knaggy
- knavish
- knotty
- known
- knurly
- tightknit
- unbeknown
- antiknock

=== ⟨gn⟩ ===
- align
- benign
- campaign
- design
- gnar
- gnarl
- gnarr
- gnash
- gnat
- gnathic
- gnathite
- gnaw
- gneiss
- gnome
- gnomon
- gnosis
- gnostic
- gnotobiotics
- gnu (animal name)
- reign
- sign

== See also ==
- Silent letter
- Silent e
