= Unidirectionality hypothesis =

Hypothesis in linguistics that grammaticalisation is unidirectional

In linguistics, the unidirectionality hypothesis proposes that grammaticalisation works in a single direction. That is, pronouns and prepositions may fuse with verbs or nouns to create new inflectional systems, but inflectional endings do not break off to create new pronouns or prepositions. The hypothesis is not universally applicable, with some rare counterexamples appearing in unusual circumstances.

The unidirectionality hypothesis does not claim that linguistic change will occur in any particular instance, only that if it does occurs, it will be in the direction from lexical word to grammatical word and not the other way around. It should not be confused with a denial of lexicalisation, which is more general addition of a word to the lexicon of a language, whether or not that word is derived from an inflectional affix.
