= Deflexion (linguistics) =

Linguistic process in inflectional languages

Deflexion is a diachronic linguistic process in inflectional languages typified by the degeneration of the inflectional structure of a language. All members of the Indo-European language family are subject to some degree of deflexional change. This phenomenon has been especially strong in Western European languages, such as English, French, and others.

Deflexion typically involves the loss of some inflectional affixes, notably affecting word endings (markers) that indicate noun cases, verbal tenses and noun classes. This is part of a process of gradual decline of the inflectional morphemes, defined as atomic semantic units bound to abstract word units (lexemes). Complete loss of the original subset of affixes combined with a development towards allomorphy and new morphology is associated in particular with creolization, i.e. the formation of pidgins and creole languages.

Directly related to deflexion is the languages becoming less synthetic and more analytic in nature. However, the ways in which languages undergo deflexion and the results of these developments are by no means uniform. For example, the modern Romance languages all continue to feature a complex verb system, while having strongly deflected their nouns, adjectives, and pronouns. German, on the other hand, has further simplified the already simple Germanic verb system (even radically so in some dialects) but has preserved the three genders and four cases of early Germanic languages.

Deflexion is a common feature of the history of many Indo-European languages. According to the Language Contact Hypothesis for Deflexion, supported by the comparison between Germanic languages (for instance, Icelandic and Afrikaans), this process is attributed to language contact. Specifically, the phenomenon occurs in the presence of large, influential groups of speakers that have acquired the leading idiom as a second language (L2) and so is limited to economical trade-offs widely considered acceptable. Though gradual, English experienced a dramatic change from Old English, a moderately inflected language using a complex case system, to Modern English, considered a weakly inflected language or even analytic. Important deflexion changes first arrived in the English language with the North Sea Germanic (Ingvaeonic) shifts, shared by Frisian and Low German dialects, such as merging accusative and dative cases into an objective case. Viking invasions and the subsequent Norman conquest accelerated the process. The importance of deflexion in the formative stage of a language can be illustrated by modern Dutch, where deflexion accounts for the overwhelming majority of linguistic changes in the last thousand years or more. Afrikaans originated from Dutch virtually by deflexion.

According to the unidirectionality hypothesis, deflexion should be subject to a semantically driven one-way cline of grammaticality. However, exceptions to the gradual diachronic process have been observed where the deflexion process diminished or came to a halt, or where inflexional case marking was occasionally reinforced. There are also a few cases of reversed directionality, e.g. in the evolution of the common Romance inflected future and conditional (or "indicative future-of-the-past") from earlier periphrastic suppletive forms for the loss of the corresponding classical Latin tenses.

== See also ==
- Periphrasis
