= Terttu =

Terttu is a Finnish feminine given name meaning “cluster of berries.”

It may refer to:

- Terttu Nevalainen (born 1952), Finnish linguist
- Terttu Savola (born 1941), Finnish politician
