= Joan Bybee =

American linguist (born 1945)

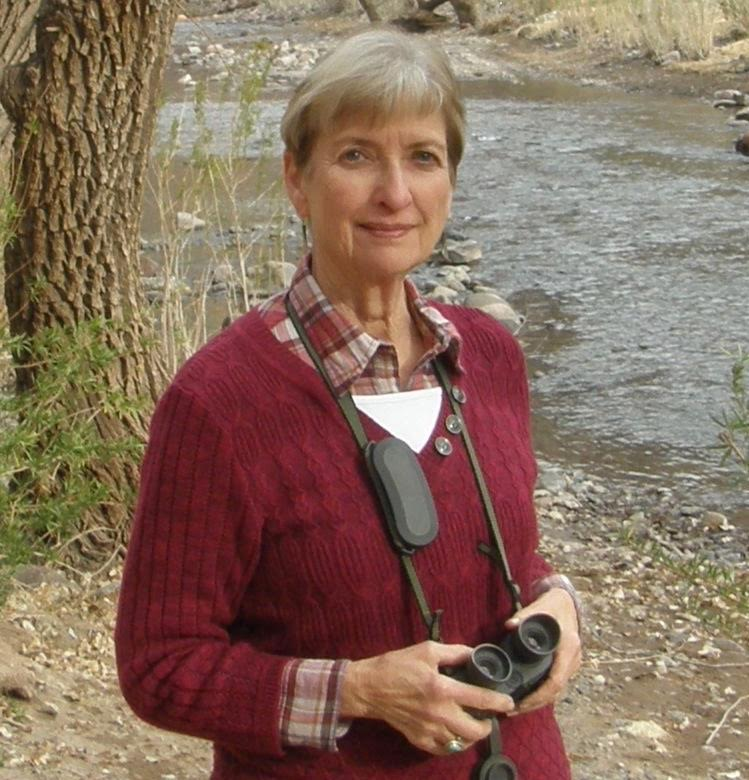
- Born: February 11, 1945 (age 81); New Orleans, Louisiana, U.S.
- Education: University of Texas (BA in Spanish and English); San Diego State University (MA in linguistics); University of California, Los Angeles (PhD in linguistics)
- Scientific career
- Fields: Phonology, morphology, linguistic typology, cognitive linguistics
- Workplaces: University at Buffalo; University of New Mexico
- Website: unm.edu/~jbybee

Joan Lea Bybee (previously Hooper; born February 11, 1945 in New Orleans, Louisiana) is an American linguist and professor emerita at the University of New Mexico. Much of her work concerns grammaticalization, stochastics, modality, morphology, and phonology. Bybee is best known for proposing the theory of usage-based phonology and for her contributions to cognitive and historical linguistics.

== Contributions to linguistic theory ==
Bybee's earliest work in linguistics was framed within a generative perspective, the dominant theoretical approach to phonology at the time. As her career developed, Bybee's contributions moved progressively from formalist theories towards a functional and cognitive perspective, incorporating insights from morphology, semantics, syntax, child language acquisition and historical linguistics.

According to Google Scholar, her work has been cited over 58,000 times.

=== Generative work (1970s) ===
==== Natural Generative Phonology ====
In the early and mid-70s, Bybee proposed that the connection between the abstract phonological representation of a word and the actual forms experienced by language users was a more direct one than previously postulated. Her theory of Natural Generative Phonology elaborated upon and expanded the work of Theo Vennemann, proposing less abstract mental representations of sound structure while arguing for greater proximity between phonetic and phonological forms.

Although belonging to a formalist tradition, Bybee's early work already contained elements that challenged the performance/competence model that underlay all Generative assumptions. Natural Generative Phonology proposed that the mental representation of language results from speakers’ exposure to actual language in use. The proposal that the structure of language derives from actual communication rather than from abstract rules wired in the brain represented a major departure from mainstream linguistics, an idea Bybee pursued in her subsequent work.

=== Morphology ===
In 1985, Bybee published Morphology: A study of the Relation between Meaning and Form, in which she identified semantic regularities across 50 genetically and geographically diverse languages. These meaning similarities manifest themselves in recurring cross-linguistic patterns in morphological systems with respect to tense, aspect and mood. This work runs counter to Chomskyan generative theory, which describes grammar as an independent module of the brain that works in an abstract manner completely detached from semantic considerations.

One of the main findings of this research is that morphemes used in derivation (e.g. -ship, -ness) bear a stronger connection to the meaning of the stem (e.g. friend-ship, drunken-ness) than inflectional ones (e.g. -s in friend-s). That is, the meaning of the inflectional morpheme -s is less central to the meaning of friend than -ship is in a word like friendship. As a result, many derivational morphemes may be understood by language users as part of the word as a whole, whose meaning may be less easy to retrieve.

Inflectional morphemes such as English -s signalling the meaning of "more than one" would then be more likely to be understood as separate from the stem, since their meaning is more general and applicable to many different words. As a result, speakers may be able to perceive it without regard to any individual stem like friend.

=== Cognitive linguistics ===
Alongside linguists Dan Slobin and Carol Moder, Bybee's work helped popularize the concept of mental schemas (or schemata) to explain grammatical structure, especially in terms of connections between morphological forms within a paradigm. Bybee defines schemas as "an emergent generalization over words having similar patterns of semantic and phonological connections". For instance, the English irregular verbs snuck, struck, strung, spun and hung are connected through a schema that builds on similarities between these verbs and across the lexicon: the meaning of past tense, the vowel [ʌ], the final nasal and/or (sequence of) velar consonants, as well as the initial fricative consonant /s/ or /h/.

Connections between individual forms and schemas exist in a network (see below) whose links can be strengthened, weakened and at times also severed or created. According to Bybee, the force that binds the links in a network is actual language usage.

==== The Network Model ====
Informed by studies on child language development, morphological change and psycholinguistic experimentation, Bybee proposed in the late 1980s and early 1990s a model to account for the cognitive representation of morphologically complex words: the Network Model. Words entered in the lexicon have varying degrees of lexical strength, due primarily to their token frequency. Words with high lexical strength are easy to access, serve as the bases of morphological relations and exhibit an autonomy that makes them resistant to change and prone to semantic independence.

=== Grammaticalization ===
Diachronic studies figure prominently in Bybee's body of work. Specifically, her work has explored the ways in which grammar emerges through language use via grammaticalization. Grammaticalization describes the concept that individual words or constructions may come to express abstract grammatical meaning (e.g. future tense) as users increasingly pair frequent words with a given meaning.

== Honors ==
Bybee served as president of the Linguistic Society of America in 2004. She was named a Fellow of the Linguistic Society of America in 2006.

== Key publications ==
- Hooper, Joan B. 1976. An Introduction to Natural Generative Phonology. New York: Academic Press.
- Bybee, Joan L. 1985. Morphology: A Study of the Relation between Meaning and Form. Amsterdam / Philadelphia: John Benjamins. (Korean translation by Seongha Rhee and Hyun Jung Koo. Seoul: Hankook Publishing Company, 2000.)
- Bybee, Joan, Revere Perkins and William Pagliuca. 1994. The Evolution of Grammar: Tense, Aspect and Modality in the Languages of the World. Chicago: University of Chicago Press.
- Bybee, Joan. 2001. Phonology and Language Use. Cambridge: Cambridge University Press.
- Bybee, Joan. 2005. "Language change and universals" in Linguistic Universals, edited by Ricardo Mairal and Juana Gil. Cambridge: Cambridge University Press.
- Bybee, Joan. 2006. Frequency of Use and the Organization of Language. Oxford: Oxford University Press.
- Bybee, Joan. 2010. Language, Usage and Cognition. Cambridge: Cambridge University Press.
- Bybee, Joan. 2015. Language Change. Cambridge: Cambridge University Press.
- Joan Lea Bybee: "Irrealis" as a Grammatical Category. Anthropological linguistics 40 NO. 2 (1998), pp. 257–271
