= Knavs =

Knavs is a Slovenian surname.

Notable people with the surname include:

- Aleksander Knavs (born 1975), Slovenian footballer
- Amalija Knavs (1945–2024), Slovenian-American textile maker; mother of Melania
- Melania Trump (born Melanija Knavs in 1970), Slovene-American model and First Lady of the United States

== See also ==
- Knauss
