= Da Chen =

Chinese-American author (1962–2019)

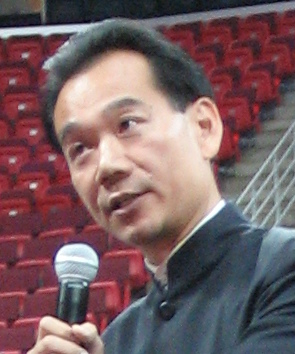
Da Chen speaking at the North Carolina State University 2007 Convocation

Da Chen (1962 – December 17, 2019) was a Chinese-American author whose works included Colors of the Mountain, Brothers, and Sword. Colors of the Mountain gave rise to a version for young readers, China's Son, and a sequel, Sounds of the River. The Washington Post, San Francisco Chronicle, Miami Herald and Publishers Weekly hailed Brothers as the best book of 2006.

Born in Huangshi, Putian, Fujian, China, he grew up in poverty during the Cultural Revolution. His paternal grandfather had owned land, and that wealth attracted the persecution of the Chinese Communist Party. That persecution did not spare the rest of the family, and Chen was expelled from school and sent down to the countryside to do hard labor. Even though the Cultural Revolution denied him much of his formal education, Chen studied for and performed well in the college entrance exams reinstated after the Cultural Revolution. He was admitted to and graduated from Beijing Language and Culture University. After teaching there, he emigrated to the U.S. on a scholarship for Union College in Lincoln, Nebraska. In 1990, he received a J.D. from Columbia Law School, and he then worked as an investment banker while writing. After the publications of his memoirs, he also taught writing at Fairfield University and New York University.

Chen lived in Southern California with his wife, Sunny, and two children. Chen died December 17, 2019, at his home in Temecula, California, from lung cancer.

== Bibliography ==
- Colors of the Mountain (1999)
- China's Son: Growing Up in the Cultural Revolution (2001)
- Sounds of the River: A Memoir (2002)
- Wandering Warrior (2003)
- Brothers (2006)
- Sword (2008)
- My Last Empress (2012)
- Girl Under a Red Moon (2019)

== See also ==
- Scar literature
- Sent-down youth
