= Beijing Language and Culture University =

Public university in Beijing, China

- 北京语言大学
- Other name: Bei Yu (北语)
- Former names: Higher Preparatory School for Foreign Students (1962–1964), Beijing Language Institute (1964–1996)
- Established: 1962; 64 years ago
- President: Peng Duan
- Vice-president: Cao Zhiyun, Qi Dexiang, Dong Lijun
- Chairperson of the University Council: Ni Haidong
- Administrative staff: 1,201 (est.)
- Undergraduates: 6,258 (4,486 domestic, 1,772 international)
- Postgraduates: 2,216 (1,879 domestic, 337 international)
- Doctoral students: 338 (242 domestic, 96 international)
- Location: Beijing, China; 39°59′36″N 116°20′16″E
- Campus: Urban
- Colors: Green, yellow, gray
- Mascot: Beiyuer (宝贝鱼)
- Website: blcu.edu.cn english.blcu.edu.cn

Chinese name
- Simplified Chinese: 北京语言大学
- Traditional Chinese: 北京語言大學
Transcriptions
Standard Mandarin
- Hanyu Pinyin: Běijīng Yǔyán Dàxué

Yuyan Xueyuan
- Simplified Chinese: 语言学院
- Traditional Chinese: 語言學院
Transcriptions
Standard Mandarin
- Hanyu Pinyin: Yǔyán Xuéyuàn

Beijing Language and Culture University (BLCU; 北京语言大学) is a public university of linguistics in Haidian, Beijing, China. It is affiliated with the Ministry of Education of China.

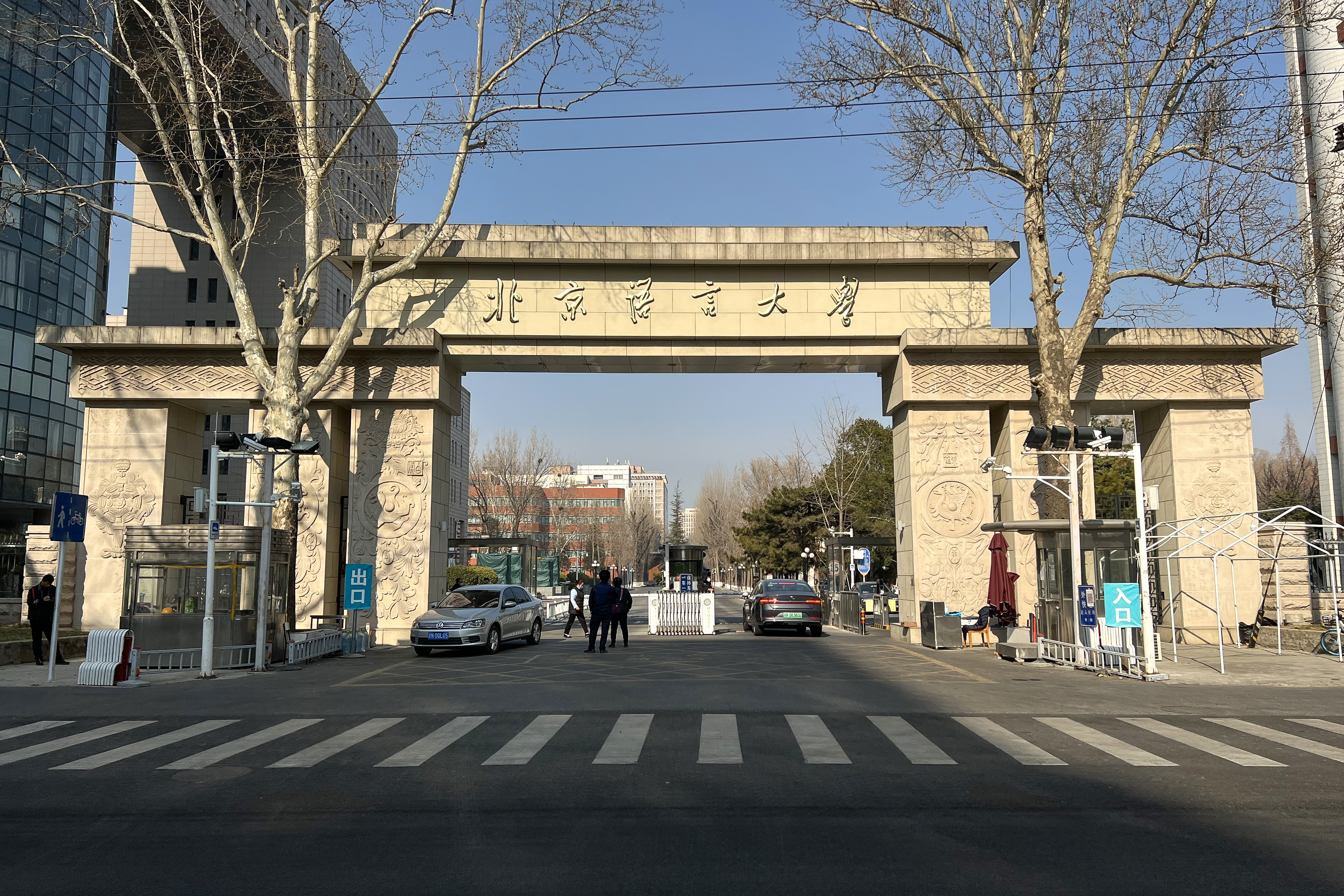
The current south gate

The university has the main aim of teaching the Chinese language and culture to foreign students. It is a key university directly under the Ministry of Education of the People's Republic of China. It is the only international university founded by the People's Republic of China named after "language" and with the main mission of spreading Chinese language and culture. However, it also takes Chinese students specializing in foreign languages and other relevant subjects of humanities and social sciences, and trains teachers of Chinese as a foreign language. It used to be the only institute of this kind in China. After the push for higher education starting in the 90s, nowadays many other universities in almost every major city in China have a similar offer. Thus bachelor, master or post-doc degrees in "Teaching Chinese as a second language to Foreigners", as well as bachelor's and master's degrees in several foreign languages, are no longer only to be found at BLCU.

Beijing Language and Culture University is often called "Little United Nations" in China because of its very large number of international students from various countries. As of 2022, there are approximately 9,000 international students in its campus, ranking first in China.

As of 2020, Beijing Language and Culture University ranked no.5 nationwide among universities specialized on languages teaching and research in the recent edition of a recognized Best Chinese Universities Ranking, the sub-ranking of Shanghai Ranking.

== History ==
Early in the 1950s when the teaching of Chinese as a foreign language (TCFL) was still at the initial stage, the first generation of BLCU teachers took an active part in the pioneering work. As a result, the first school of higher education specially oriented to foreign students, "Higher Preparatory School for Foreign Students", was established in June 1962. In 1964, the school was officially named "Beijing Language Institute" (Chinese: 北京语言学院; pinyin: Běijīng yǔyán xuéyuàn). In June 1996, it was renamed "Beijing Language and Culture University" (Chinese: 北京语言文化大学; pinyin: Běijīng yǔyán wénhuà dàxué). Its Chinese name was shortened in July 2002 to "Beijing Language University" with the approval of the Ministry of Education, but the English name remained unchanged. September 6, 2002, witnessed the celebration of the 40th anniversary of BLCU, for which General-Secretary Jiang Zemin and Vice-Premier Li Lanqing wrote letters of congratulations, and the Chairman of the NPC Standing Committee Li Peng wrote words of encouragement. BLCU was granted the privilege to confer doctoral degrees in foreign languages and literature in 2011.

Throughout its history, the university has educated more than 220,000 international students from 189 different nations and regions around the globe. As of 2022, there are approximately 9,000 international students in its campus, ranking first in China.

== Campus ==
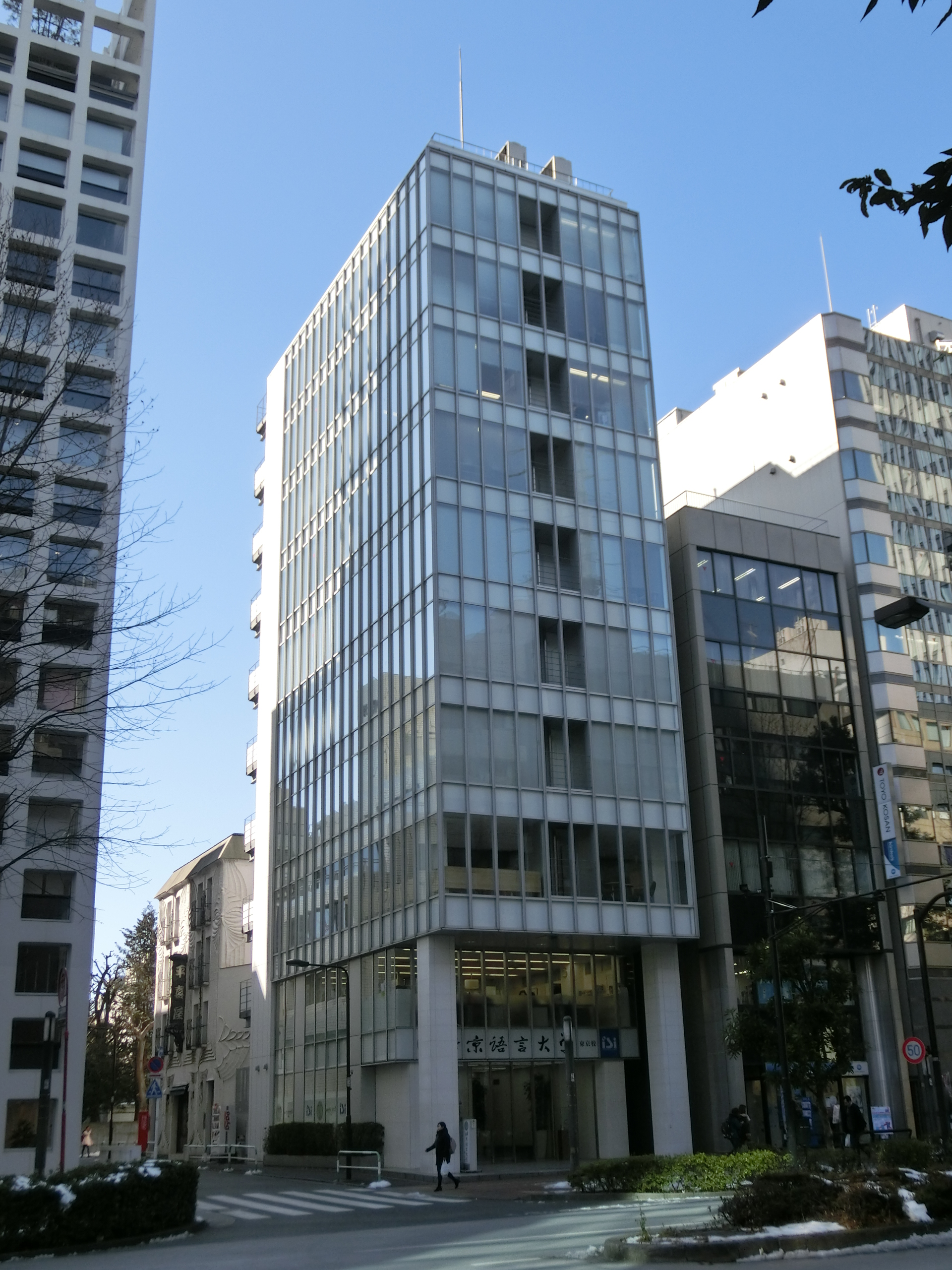
Tokyo College

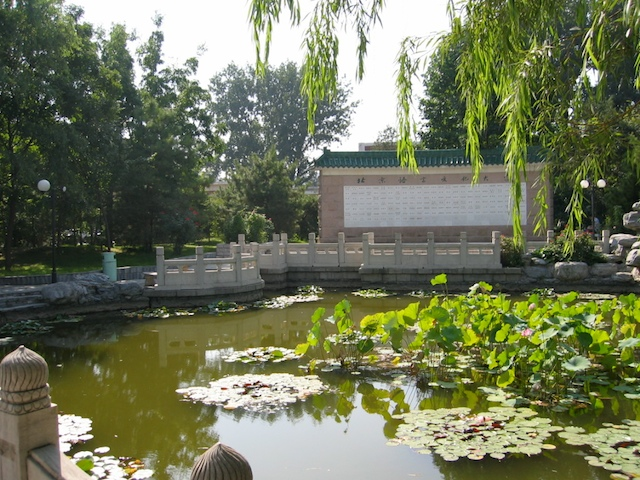
BLCU park

The campus of BLCU is located in the Haidian District of Beijing. It takes about 330,289 m^{2}, and total building area is about 427,342 m^{2}. Most teaching facilities, including the main building, library and gym are in the teaching area, while dormitories for Chinese students are there as well. The special dormitory for foreign students is Building 17, located in the living area with apartments for staff and families. Some grocery stores can be found in both the teaching and living areas, and the biggest market zone Wudaokou is near the north exit of the living area.

== Bachelor's degree programs ==
- Chinese Language and Literature
- Teaching Chinese as a Second Language
- English Language and Literature
- French Language and Literature
- German Language and Literature
- Spanish Language and Literature
- Russian Language and Literature
- Arabic Language and Literature
- Japanese Language and Literature
- Korean Language and Literature
- Italian Language and Literature
- Portuguese Language and Literature
- Turkish Language and Literature
- Translation and Interpretation
- Computer Science and Technology
- Information Management and Information Systems
- Technology of Digital Media
- Finance
- Accounting
- Painting
- Journalism
- International Politics
- International Economics and Trade

== Master's degree programs ==
- Chinese Linguistics and Philology
- Linguistics and Applied Linguistics
- Course Design and Teaching Theories
- Special Historical Studies
- Chinese Ancient Literature
- International Politics
- Foreign Linguistics and Applied Linguistics
- Comparative Literature and World Literature
- Contemporary Chinese Literature
- Literary Theory
- Ancient Chinese Philology
- English Language and Literature
- French Language and Literature
- Japanese Language and Literature
- Spanish Language and Literature
- Arabic Language and Literature
- European Languages and Literatures
- Asian and African Languages and Literatures
- Ideological and Political Education
- Basic Psychology
- Chinese Ethnic Languages and Literatures
- Master's program of Teaching Chinese to Speakers of Other Languages (MTCSOL)
- Technology of Computer Application
- Master of Translation and Interpreting

== Doctoral degree programs ==
- Arabic Language and Literature
- Linguistics and Applied Linguistics
- Comparative Literature and World Literature
- Chinese Ancient Literature
- English Language and Literature
- Theory of Literature and Art
- Chinese Philology
- Studies of Ancient Chinese Documents
- Modern and Contemporary Chinese Literature
- Chinese Ethnic Languages and Literatures

== Notable faculty ==
- Wei-Heng Chen
- Liang Xiaosheng, novelist and screenwriter
- Huang Jing, Chinese-American political scientist and alleged spy
- Valerie Grosvenor Myer, English novelist, biographer and literary historian

== Notable alumni ==
- Da Chen, author
- Hong Lei, diplomat
- Kassym-Jomart Tokayev, President of Kazakhstan and Former Director-General of the United Nations Office at Geneva
- Karim Massimov, Prime Minister of Kazakhstan (10 January 2007 - 24 September 2012 and 2 April 2014 - 8 September 2016)
- Mulatu Teshome, President of the Federal Democratic Republic of Ethiopia (7 October 2013 - 25 October 2018)
- Awkwafina, Actress and rapper
- Xiaomanyc, language YouTuber

== See also ==
- Beijing Language and Culture University Press
- Japan Campus of Foreign Universities
