= Bernd Heine =

German linguist

- Born: 25 May 1939 (age 87); Mohrungen, East Prussia
- Occupation: Linguist

Academic background
- Education: University of Cologne

Academic work
- Institutions: University of Cologne
- Main interests: Languages of Africa

Bernd Heine (born 25 May 1939) is a German linguist and specialist in African studies.

From 1978 to 2004 Heine held the chair for African Studies at the University of Cologne, Germany, now being a Professor Emeritus. His main focal points in research and teaching are African linguistics, sociolinguistics, grammaticalization theory and language contact and discourse grammar. The grammaticalisation theory, which deals with the changes in grammar, and to which he contributed 7 books and numerous articles, is his main focal point. Jointly with Tania Kuteva and Gunther Kaltenböck, Heine is the founder of the framework of discourse grammar.

== Early years and education ==
Heine was born in Mohrungen, East Prussia (now Morąg, Poland). During the Second World War, in 1944 his parents fled to Austria and later took up residence in Bavaria, before settling in Leverkusen in 1948. From 1949 to 1959 Heine attended the Landrat-Lucas-Gymnasium in Opladen. Afterwards, he studied at the University of Cologne and University of Hamburg. In 1967 he was awarded a PhD in Cologne. In 1972 he received his postdoctoral lecture qualification for African studies.

== Professional career ==
From 1968 to 1969 he was an assistant at the Department for African Studies of the University of Cologne, from 1969 to 1972 he was a lecturer and from 1975 to 1978 visiting professor at the University of Nairobi. In 1978 he took over the chair of African Studies at the University of Cologne.

He carried out 25 field research trips to Ghana, Togo, Kenya, Tanzania, Uganda and Namibia as well as lecturing trips to Australia, Austria, Brazil, Estonia, Ethiopia, Finland, France, Italy, Japan, Kenya, Mexico, Namibia, the Netherlands, Poland, Spain, South Africa, South Korea, Sweden, Tanzania, the United Kingdom and the United States.

Guest professorships brought him to La Trobe University, Melbourne in 1994/1995 and from 1999 to 2000 to the Center for Advanced Study in the Behavioral Sciences in Stanford, United States, in 2002 to the Dartmouth College, US, in 2005 to the University of Graz and from 2005 to 2006 to the Netherlands Institute for Advanced Study in Wassenaar, the Netherlands, in 2006 to the University of Hamburg, in 2007 to the Ecole des Hautes Etudes (Centre de Recherches Linguistiques sur l'Asie Orientale "CRLAO"), Paris, in 2007 to the Federal University of Rio de Janeiro, 2008 through 2009 to the Tokyo University of Foreign Studies, Japan, and in 2009 to the Chonnam National University, Korea. He was a visiting professor at the University of Cape Town in 2012 and 2015, and in 2014 he was appointed Yunshan Chair Professor at Guangdong University of Foreign Studies, China (2014 - 2016).

Bernd Heine has served as a keynote speaker or invited speaker of over 100 international conferences. His publications include more than 40 books on African linguistics, sociolinguistics, historical linguistics, grammaticalization theory, and discourse grammar. He is co-editor and/or member of the advisory boards of 17 journals or series of books. Since 2014 his main interest has been, jointly with Gunther Kaltenböck and Tania Kuteva, the analysis of linguistic discourse. In the framework of discourse grammar developed by these authors, two components of discourse planning are distinguished, where one, Sentence Grammar, is centrally concerned with the construction of sentences while the other, Thetical Grammar, is dedicated to the relationship between speaker, hearer, and the text.

== Awards ==
His awards include a membership with the Executive Council, International African Institute, London. In 1986 he became Hans Wolff Memorial Lecturer at the Indiana University, US, in 1990 Raymond Dart Memorial Lecturer at the University of Johannesburg, South Africa. In 1990 he received the Kenya Kiswahili Association Award in Nairobi, in 1994 he was Fellow of the Australian Research Council, in 1995 he received an award from the National Kiswahili Council of the Republic of Tanzania. In 1995 he became August Klingenheben Memorial Lecturer at the University of Leipzig and in 1996 a Fellow of the British Academy. From 1997 to 2000 he was president of the Committee for World Congresses of African Linguistics and in 1999 he became a full member of the North Rhine-Westphalia Academy of Sciences. In 2008, the Ministry of Education, Science, and Technology, South Korea, appointed him a Distinguished World-Class Scholar, and in 2009 he received the Lifetime Achievement Award of the Evolutionary Linguistics Association, Brussels. He was made a member of the European Science Foundation in 2016. In 2012, he became an Honorary Member of the Linguistic Society of America, and in 2020 of the Philological Society of London.

== Selected publications ==
- Grammaticalization and reanalysis in African languages. Buske, 1984 (Co-authored by Mechthild Reh).
- Grammaticalization: A conceptual framework. University of Chicago Press, 1991 (Co-authored by Ulrike Claudi and Friederike Hünnemeyer).
- Approaches to grammaticalization. Two volumes, 1991. Benjamins (Co-edited with Elizabeth C. Traugott).
- Auxiliaries: Cognitive forces and grammaticalization, 1993. Oxford University Press.
- The Mukogodo Maasai: An ethno-botanical survey, 1994 Köppe (Co-authored by Matthias Brenzinger and Ingo Heine).
- Swahili Plants. Cologne: Köppe Verlag, 1995 (Co-authored by Karsten Legère).
- Cognitive foundations of grammar. Oxford University Press, 1997.
- Possession: Cognitive sources, forces, and grammaticalization. Cambridge University Press, 1997.
- Ik dictionary. (Nilo-Saharan, 15.) Köppe, 1999.
- African languages: An introduction. Cambridge University Press, 2000 (Co-edited by Derek Nurse).
- World lexicon of grammaticalization. Cambridge University Press, 2002 (Co-authored by Tania Kuteva).
- Language contact and grammatical change. Cambridge University Press, 2005 (Co-authored by Tania Kuteva).
- The changing languages of Europe. Oxford University Press, 2006 (Co-authored by Tania Kuteva).
- The genesis of grammar: a reconstruction. Oxford University Press, 2007 (Co-authored by Tania Kuteva).
- A linguistic geography of Africa. Cambridge University Press, 2008 (Co-edited by Derek Nurse).
- The Oxford handbook of linguistic analysis. Oxford University Press, 2010 (Co-edited by Heiko Narrog).
- Grammaticalization from a typological perspective. Oxford University Press, 2019 (Co-edited by Heiko Narrog)
- World lexicon of grammaticalization. Second, extensively revised and updated edition. Cambridge University Press, 2019 (Co-edited by Tania Kuteva, Bo Hong, Haiping Long, Heiko Narrog, and Seongha Rhee).
- The Akie language of Tanzania: Texts and dictionary. Köppe, 2020 (Co-authored by Christa König, Karsten Legère, and Ingo Heine).
- Grammaticalization. Oxford University Press, 2021 (Co-authored by Heiko Narrog).
- The rise of discourse markers. Cambridge University Press, 2021 (Co-authored by Gunther Kaltenböck, Tania Kuteva, and Haiping Long).
- The Oxford handbook of grammaticalization. Oxford University Press, 2021 (Co-edited by Heiko Narrog).
