= Content word =

Concept in linguistics

Content words, in linguistics, are words that possess semantic content and contribute to the meaning of the sentence in which they occur. In a traditional approach, nouns were said to name objects and other entities, lexical verbs to indicate actions, adjectives to refer to attributes of entities, and adverbs to attributes of actions. They contrast with function words, which have very little substantive meaning and primarily denote grammatical relationships between content words, such as prepositions (in, out, under etc.), pronouns (I, you, he, who etc.) and conjunctions (and, but, till, as etc.).

All words can be classified as either content or function words, but it is not always easy to make the distinction. With only around 150 function words, 99.9% of words in the English language are content words. Although small in number, function words are used at a disproportionately higher rate than content and make up about 50% of any English text because of the conventional patterns of usage that binds function words to content words almost every time they are used, which creates an interdependence between the two word groups.

Content words are usually open class words, and new words are easily added to the language. In relation to English phonology, content words generally adhere to the minimal word constraint of being no shorter than two morae long (a minimum length of two light syllables or one heavy syllable), but function words often do not.

== See also ==
- Lexical verb
- Grammaticalization, the process by which words may change from content to function words
