= Cooptation (grammar) =

Cooptation is a cognitive-communicative operation whereby a piece of text, such as a clause, a phrase, a word, or any other unit, is inserted in a sentence. In the framework of Discourse Grammar, cooptation is understood as leading to the transfer of linguistic material from the domain of Sentence Grammar to that of Thetical Grammar.

== An example ==
The operation of cooptation can be illustrated with the following utterance taken from the British component of the International Corpus of English:

- What I’ve done here I hope you don’t entirely disapprove is try and limit the time taken on this item by putting it in writing. (ICE-GB: s1b-075-180)

In this example, the utterance is obviously composed of two pieces: On the one hand, there is the well-formed and self-contained sentence What I’ve done here is try and limit the time taken on this item by putting it in writing, which provides the host construction. On the other hand, there is the piece I hope you don’t entirely disapprove, which is inserted in the host construction but neither syntactically nor semantically, nor prosodically integrated in the host construction, and rather than contributing to the meaning of the sentence, it relates to the situation of discourse. Such inserts are commonly known as parentheticals or extra-clausal constituents. In the framework of Discourse Grammar they are referred to as theticals, and cooptation is the operation that enables speakers to transfer them from one domain of grammar to the other, and to place them in various slots of the host construction.

== Principles and concepts ==
Sentence Grammar is organized in terms of propositional concepts and clauses and their combination while Thetical Grammar concerns the linguistic discourse beyond the sentence. While being in principle separate domains, the two interact in various ways in organizing linguistic discourse, and the main way of interaction is via cooptation. Cooptation is fully productive, that is, it can be employed by speakers any time to structure speech. As long as the hearer can be expected to construct a reasonable hypothesis on the relevance of the coopted unit to the utterance concerned there are few restrictions on what form the coopted unit may take and where it can be placed in its host construction.
