= Tania Kuteva =

Bulgarian historical linguist

Tania Kuteva (born 1958 in Bourgas, Bulgaria) is a historical linguist specializing in grammaticalization, language contact and discourse grammar.

Her surname is Romanized as Kuteva in academic publications, and as Kouteva (following Danchev's system) for administrative purposes.

== Career and honours ==
Kuteva received her doctorate from the University of Sofia, and worked at the same institution as assistant professor between 1981 and 1990. After positions as research associate at the universities of Cologne (1994–1999) and Hamburg (1999–2000), she was appointed professor of English linguistics at the Heinrich Heine University Düsseldorf in 2000, where she has spent the rest of her career.

Kuteva has held visiting positions at the University of Texas at San Antonio (2002), the Max Planck Institute for Evolutionary Anthropology (2004–5), the Netherlands Institute for Advanced Study (2006), and SOAS University of London (2009–12); she retains an affiliation at the latter. She was elected Member of the Academia Europaea in 2017.

== Research ==
Kuteva's early work at the University of Sofia (pre-1990) focused on Bulgarian-English contrastive linguistics and issues of scientific and technical lexis and texts. Nowadays she is better known as a specialist in grammaticalization and language contact, and as one of the founders of discourse grammar; other interests include the origin and subsequent evolution of language(s), the development of auxiliary verbs, linguistic typology, relative clauses, the avertive as a grammatical category, and the lateralization of brain function for language. Together with Bernd Heine she authored the World Lexicon of Grammaticalization, an encyclopedic treatment of the origin of grammatical words and morphemes across languages; this volume is now in its second edition. Her volumes on Language contact and grammatical change and on The genesis of grammar, both written with Heine and linking language contact and the study of the evolution of languages respectively with grammaticalization theory, are also very influential: each has been cited over a thousand times.

== Selected publications ==
- Kuteva, Tania. 2004. Auxiliation: an enquiry into the nature of grammaticalization. Oxford: Oxford University Press. ISBN 9780199265053
- Heine, Bernd, and Tania Kuteva. 2005. Language contact and grammatical change. Cambridge: Cambridge University Press. ISBN 9780511614132
- Heine, Bernd, and Tania Kuteva. 2006. The changing languages of Europe. Oxford: Oxford University Press. ISBN 9780199297337
- Heine, Bernd, and Tania Kuteva. 2007. The genesis of grammar: a reconstruction. Oxford: Oxford University Press. ISBN 9780199227761
- Kaltenböck, Günther, Bernd Heine and Tania Kuteva. 2011. On thetical grammar. Studies in Language 35 (4), 852–897. doi:10.1075/sl.35.4.03kal
- Heine, Bernd, Tania Kuteva, Bo Hong, Haiping Long, Heiko Narrog, and Seongha Rhee. 2019. World lexicon of grammaticalization. Second edition. Cambridge: Cambridge University Press. ISBN 9781107136243
