= Paul J. Hopper =

American linguist

Paul J. Hopper is an American linguist who was born in Great Britain. In 1973, he proposed the glottalic theory regarding the reconstruction of the Proto-Indo-European consonant inventory, in parallel with the Georgian linguist Tamaz Gamkrelidze and the Russian linguist Vyacheslav Ivanov. He later also became known for his theory of emergent grammar, his contributions to the theory of grammaticalization, and other work dealing with the interface between grammar and usage. He is Paul Mellon Distinguished Professor Emeritus of the Humanities, Rhetoric and Linguistics at Carnegie Mellon University in Pittsburgh, United States.

== Selected publications ==
- (1973) "Glottalized and murmured occlusives in Indo-European". Glotta 7(2): 141–166.
- (1987) "Emergent grammar". Berkeley Linguistics Society 13: 139–157.
- (1993) (with Elizabeth C. Traugott) Grammaticalization. Cambridge University Press.
