= Discourse grammar =

Discourse Grammar (DG) is a grammatical framework that grew out of the analysis of spoken and written linguistic discourse on the one hand, and of work on parenthetical expressions, including Simon C. Dik's study of extra-clausal constituents, on the other. Initiated by Gunther Kaltenböck, Bernd Heine and Tania Kuteva, the framework is based on the distinction between two organizing principles of grammar where one concerns the structure of sentences and the other the linguistic organization beyond the sentence.

In accordance with the perspective adopted in this framework, linguistic units such as formulae of social exchange, interjections, discourse markers and other prefabricated expressions, which tend to be assigned a more marginal status in many models of mainstream linguistics, are interpreted as playing an important role in structuring linguistic discourse.

== Influences ==
Work on Discourse Grammar (DG) has been inspired by a number of different works, in particular by Simon C. Dik's theory of Functional Grammar according to which linguistic discourse is composed of two different kinds of linguistic material, referred to, respectively, as clausal and extra-clausal constituents. On the other hand, it has benefitted greatly from research on the nature of parenthetical categories and the concept of supplements.

== Principles ==
DG is composed of all the linguistic resources that are available for designing texts, irrespective of whether these are spoken or written (or signed) texts. It is viewed both as an activity, a real-time interactional tool, and a knowledge store consisting of a set of conventional linguistic units plus their combinatorial potential. An elementary distinction between two main domains of speech processing is made, referred to as Sentence Grammar and Thetical Grammar.

Sentence Grammar is organized in terms of propositional concepts and clauses and their combination. It has been the only, or the main subject of mainstream theories of linguistics. The concern of Thetical Grammar is with theticals, that is, with linguistic discourse units beyond the sentence, being syntactically, semantically, and typically also prosodically detached from expressions of Sentence Grammar. These units include what is traditionally referred to as parenthetical constructions but are not restricted to them. The main categories of Thetical Grammar are conceptual theticals (including comment clauses, discourse markers, etc.) as well as various other extra-clausal categories such as vocatives, formulae of social exchange, and interjections. While being separate in principle, the two domains interact in multiple ways in shaping linguistic discourse. The main way of interaction is via cooptation, an operation whereby chunks of Sentence Grammar such as clauses, phrases, words, or any other units are deployed for use in Thetical Grammar.

== Application ==
Being a relatively young framework, DG has so far found only limited applications. Work has focused mainly on comment clauses, discourse markers, final particles, and insubordination. Furthermore, DG as a descriptive tool has for the most part been restricted to the study of English. Analysis within this framework is now being extended to non-European languages. More detailed research has been carried out already on Akie, a traditional hunter-gatherer language of the Nilotic family spoken in north-central Tanzania. A grammar of this language based on DG has been published, the use of theticals in the organization of texts has been studied, and institutional frames surfacing from the analysis of Akie texts have been identified using Thetical Grammar as a basis.

In another line of research, DG has been extended to the study of language contact. As the work on the discourse in bilingual situations has shown, theticals play an important role both in code-switching and borrowing. Furthermore, there is reason to assume that the distinction between Sentence Grammar and Thetical Grammar may shed new light on the question of how human language or languages evolved.

Finally, a considerable part of the research is devoted to the question of whether the distinction between the two domains is reflected in neural activity. As this research suggests, there appears to be a corresponding distinction in brain lateralization, in that Sentence Grammar correlates primarily with left-hemisphere activity whereas Thetical grammar appears to be more strongly associated with right-hemisphere activation.

== Related work ==
That discourse organization operates simultaneously in two different dimensions has also been pointed out in a number of other research traditions. Thus, a distinction akin to that between Sentence Grammar and Thetical Grammar is also made in some psycholinguistic studies on comprehension where a contrast between propositional representation and discourse model is made, and in neurolinguistic discourse analysis there is a related distinction between referential and modalizing speech. In other frameworks, specific manifestations of the distinction are highlighted, such as that between microgrammar and macrogrammar, or between an analytic and a holistic mode of processing, or between conceptual and procedural meaning in the theory of Relevance Grammar.
