= Knauss =

Knauss is a German surname, known from at least 1515. The earliest people recorded with this name appear to be from southern Germany. The meaning is very unclear but may mean "haughty person." Other suggested sources have included a sharp strike (hit), a beard, the crust of a loaf of bread, or a small hill. Known descendant variants of the name include Knaus, Knauß, Knous, Knause, Knouse, Kanouse, Kenouse, and Canouse. Other variants believed to have been used at one time include Knouss and Knows. It is possible that variant names without the initial "K" are descended from this line, but no evidence to this has been discovered yet.

A Slovene variant of that German name Knauss is Knavs and Knau´vs "On Surnames Knavs and Knaus".. Melania Trump germanised her name from "Melanija Knavs" to "Melania Knauss" as part of her modeling career.

== List of people with the surname Knauss ==
- Donald Knauss, former CEO of Clorox
- John A. Knauss, oceanographer
- Jürgen Knauss (1938–2024), German entrepreneur, marketer and photographer
- Melania Knauss Trump, former model and current First Lady of the United States
- Sarah Knauss (1880–1999), supercentenarian and the oldest known person from the United States
- Sibylle Knauss (born 1944), German writer and academic

== List of people with the surname Knaus ==
- Chad Knaus (born 1971), NASCAR crew chief
- Eric Knaus (born 1970), children's entertainer known as "The Great Zucchini"
- Gerald Knaus (born 1970), Austrian social scientist
- Hermann Knaus (1892–1970), Austrian gynaecologist
- Ludwig Knaus (1829–1910), painter
- Michael Knaus, Paralympic skier
- Thomas Knaus (born 1974), German scientist

== List of people with the surname Knauß ==
- Bernhard Knauß (born 1965), Austrian-Slovenian alpine skier
- Hans Knauß (born 1971), Austrian alpine skier

== Other spellings ==
- Bessie B. Kanouse (1889-1969), American mycologist
- William Lee Knous (1889–1959), Colorado governor
- Robert Lee Knous (1917–2000), Colorado lieutenant governor
