= Subjectification (linguistics) =

In historical (or diachronic) linguistics, subjectification (also known as subjectivization or subjectivisation) is a language change process in which a linguistic expression acquires meanings that convey the speaker's attitude or viewpoint. An English example is the word while, which, in Middle English, had only the sense of 'at the same time that'. It later acquired the meaning of 'although', indicating a concession on the part of the speaker ("While it could use a tune-up, it's a good bike.").

This is a pragmatic-semantic process, which means that inherent as well as contextual meanings of the given expression are considered. Subjectification is realized in lexical and grammatical change. It is also of interest to cognitive linguistics and pragmatics.

== Subjectivity in language ==
From a synchronic perspective, subjectivity can be expressed in language in many ways. First of all, the subject is implied in discourse through any speech act. Subjectivity can also be expressed in many grammatical categories, such as person, valence, tense, aspect, mood, evidentials, and deictic expressions more generally.

== Subjectification and intersubjectification ==
The most prominent research on subjectification to date comes from linguists Elizabeth Traugott and Ronald Langacker. In Traugott's view, subjectification is a semasiological process in which a linguistic element's "meanings tend to become increasingly based in the speaker's subjective belief state/attitude toward the proposition". From Langacker's standpoint, "an expression's meaning always comprises both subjectively and objectively construed elements, and it is individual conceptual elements within an expression's meaning that, over time, may come to be construed with a greater degree of subjectivity or objectivity".

Traugott also discusses "intersubjectification", alternatively calling subjectivity "(inter)subjectivity" and subjectification "(inter)subjectification". She writes,

In my view, subjectification and intersubjectification are the mechanisms by which:

a. meanings are recruited by the speaker to encode and regulate attitudes and beliefs (subjectification), and,
b. once subjectified, may be recruited to encode meanings centred on the addressee (intersubjectification).

Subjectification occurs in conversation (through speech acts) and has rhetorical aims, and thus implies some degree of intersubjectivity. Intersubjectification does so more blatantly through its "development of meanings that explicitly reveal incipient design: the designing of utterances for an intended audience...at the discourse level" and requires subjectification to occur in the first place.

Traugott and Dasher schematize the process of subjectification elsewhere in the following cline:

non-subjective > subjective > intersubjective

== Grammaticalization ==
Grammaticalization is an associated process of language change in which "lexical items and constructions come in certain linguistic contexts to serve grammatical functions, and once grammaticalized, continue to develop new grammatical functions". The processes of subjectification and intersubjectification do not necessarily result in grammaticalization, but there is still a strong correlation between the two. As shown in the cline above, subjectification is theorized to be a unidirectional process; in other words, meanings tend to follow the path from left to right and do not develop in the reverse direction. Grammaticalization is likewise suggested to be a unidirectional phenomenon.

== Example ==
Traugott proposes that the epistemic adverb evidently, which initially meant 'from evidence, clearly' and later developed into a subjective adverb, underwent subjectification:

- "1429 Will Braybroke in Ess.AST 5: 298 Yif thay finde euidently that i haue doon extorcion
  - 'If they find from evidence that I have performed extortions' (MED)
- 1443 Pecock Rule 56: More euydently fals þan þis is, þer is no þing
  - 'There is nothing more clearly false than this' (MED)
- 1690 Locke, Hum. Und. II. xxix: No Idea, therefore, can be undistinguishable from another ... for from all other, it is evidently different ('evident to all', weak subjective epistemic) (OED)
- 20th c.?: He is evidently right (in the meaning 'I conclude that he is right'; strong subjective epistemic inviting the inference of some concession or doubt on speaker's part)"
