= Lemma (psycholinguistics) =

Conceptual form of a word

In psychology, a lemma (pl.: lemmas or lemmata) is an abstract conceptual form of a word that has been mentally selected prior to the early stages of speech production. This concept is used to explain how the process of generating speech occurs. In particular, lemmas are seen as the mental representations of words that are organised and retrieved from memory before they are eventually spoken. A lemma represents a specific meaning but does not have any specific sounds that are attached to it.

When a person produces a word, they are essentially turning their thoughts into sounds, a process known as lexicalisation. In many psycholinguistic models this is considered to be at least a two-stage process. The first stage deals with semantics and syntax; the result of the first stage is an abstract notion of a word that represents a meaning and contains information about how the word can be used in a sentence. It does not, however, contain information about how the word is pronounced. The second stage deals with the phonology of the word; it attaches information about the sounds that will have to be uttered. The result of the first stage is the lemma in this model; the result of the second stage is referred to as the lexeme.

This two-staged model is the most widely supported theory of speech production in psycholinguistics, although it has been challenged. For example, there is some evidence to indicate that the grammatical gender of a noun is retrieved from the word's phonological form (the lexeme) rather than from the lemma. This can be explained by models that do not assume a distinct level between the semantic and the phonological stages (and so lack a lemma representation).

During the process of language activation, lemma retrieval is the first step in lexical access. In this step, meaning and the syntactic elements of a lexical item are realized as the lemma. Lemma retrieval, as explained through a spreading-activation theory, is part of a network of separate elements consisting of the abstract concept, the lemma and the lexeme. Lemma retrieval is aided by the activation level of the concept that has yet to be verbalized. When activation takes place on the lemma level, the highest activated lemma element is selected.

Lexical selection experiments have provided evidence that lemma retrieval is affected by the frequency of the word. This indicates that word frequency is not only significant for retrieving the lexical elements, but also in accessing semantic and syntactic elements for encoding lemmas into a phrase.

Experiments that have studied the Tip-of-the tongue (TOT) phenomenon have provided evidence that less strong connections of phonological elements (lexemes) and lexical and syntactic representation (lemmas) lead to an inability to retrieve a lexical item. TOT utterances provide evidence that the lemmas and lexemes are separate processes in language activation.

== See also ==
- Language perception
