= Beijing Language and Culture University Press =

University press

Beijing Language and Culture University Press 北京语言大学出版社
- Parent company: Beijing Language and Culture University
- Founded: 1985
- Country of origin: China
- Headquarters location: Beijing
- Official website: blcup.com

The Beijing Language and Culture University Press (BLCUP; 北京语言大学出版社) is a publisher and university press that specializes in publishing Chinese textbooks. Established as a department within Beijing Language and Culture University, the press issued its first title in 1985.
