= Lexical verb =

Type of verb indicating more than just grammar

In linguistics a lexical verb or main verb is a member of an open class of verbs that includes all verbs except auxiliary verbs. Lexical verbs typically express action, state, or other predicate meaning. In contrast, auxiliary verbs express grammatical meaning. The verb phrase of a sentence is generally headed by a lexical verb.

Lexical verbs are categorized into five categories: copular, intransitive, transitive, ditransitive, and ambitransitive.

The descriptor lexical is applied to the words of a language's lexicon, often to indicate a content word, as distinct from a function word.

== See also ==
- Light verb
