= The Great Zucchini =

American children's entertainer

Eric Knaus (born c. 1970), better known as The Great Zucchini, is a professional children's entertainer who specializes in performing for children ages 2 to 7 in the Washington Metropolitan Area. According to the Washington Post he is "Washington's top preschool entertainer" and "just stupendously great with kids."

Knaus developed the role in 2004. He has performed, among others, at the U.S. vice president's residence for a granddaughter of Dick and Lynne Cheney and at the 2003 White House Easter Egg Roll. He has also performed at eleven embassies and The World Bank. He does some 900 performances a year and has trained other entertainers in working with children.

The Great Zucchini is the only children's entertainer to have performed at DC Improv.
