= Thetical grammar =

Thetical grammar forms one of the two domains of discourse grammar, the other domain being sentence grammar. The building blocks of thetical grammar are theticals, that is, linguistic expressions which are interpolated in, or juxtaposed to, clauses or sentences but syntactically, semantically and, typically, prosodically independent from these structures. The two domains are associated with contrasting principles of designing texts: Whereas sentence grammar is essentially restricted to the structure of sentences in a propositional format, thetical grammar concerns the overall contours of discourse beyond the sentence, thereby being responsible for a higher level of discourse production.

== An example ==
The following example, taken from the Comprehensive Grammar of English, illustrates the main characteristics of thetical grammar.

- a. They considered Miss Hartley a very good teacher.
- b. They considered Miss Hartley, a very good teacher.

The phrase a very good teacher is a complement of the sentence in (a.), that is, it is part of the syntax of the sentence; in the framework of discourse grammar, it is therefore classified as belonging to sentence grammar. In (b.), by contrast, the same phrase (but printed in italics) is not part of the syntax; it is syntactically independent from the rest of the sentence, commonly classified as a non-restrictive appositive. And it is also different in other ways: Whereas in (a.) it is part of the prosody of the sentence, in (b) it is separated from the preceding clause by a tone unit boundary in spoken English and by a comma in written English. And third, there is also a difference in meaning: Whereas the meaning of a very good teacher in (a.) is determined by its syntactic function as a complement of the sentence, it is fairly independent from the sentence meaning in (b.); the former meaning has therefore been called restrictive and the latter non-restrictive. The phrase a very good teacher in (b) is classified as belonging to thetical grammar, that is, as a thetical. Theticals are defined in the following way: They are syntactically unattached, they are typically set off prosodically from the rest of the utterance, their meaning is non-restrictive, they tend to be positionally mobile, and their internal structure is built on principles of sentence grammar but can be elliptic.

== Principles and concepts ==
Sentence grammar is organized in terms of propositional concepts and clauses and their combination. Thetical grammar, by contrast, concerns the linguistic discourse beyond the sentence, its functions relate to the situation of discourse, most of all to the organization of texts, speaker-hearer interaction, and attitudes of the speaker. The domain of thetical grammar includes but is not restricted to what in other works is referred to variously as parentheticals, syntactic non-clausal units, extra-clausal constituents, disjuncts, or supplements. Paradigm examples of theticals are formulae of social exchange (Good morning!, please), vocatives (Waiter!), interjections (ouch!, wow!), and discourse markers (if you will, you know, now, well), but theticals also include a virtually unlimited pool of other expressions that are produced spontaneously, like a very good teacher in the example of (b) above.

While being separate in principle, thetical grammar interacts in multiple ways with sentence grammar in shaping linguistic discourse. The main way of interaction is via cooptation, an operation whereby chunks of sentence grammar such as clauses, phrases, words, or any other units are deployed for use in thetical grammar.
