= Wasla =

Variant of the Arabic letter hamza

ٱ

The waṣla (Arabic: وَصْلَة, lit. 'an instance of connection') or hamzatu l-waṣli (هَمْزَةُ ٱلْوَصْلِ, 'hamza of connection') is a variant of the letter hamza (ء) resembling part of the letter ṣād (ص) that is sometimes placed over the letter ʾalif at the beginning of the word (ٱ). The ʾalif with waṣla over it is called the ʾalifu l-waṣli (أَلِفُ ٱلْوَصْلِ, 'aleph of connection'). It indicates that the alif is not pronounced as a glottal stop (written as the hamza), but that the word is connected to the previous word (like liaison in French). Outside of vocalised liturgical texts, the waṣla is usually not written.

It is written in two positions:

Position in word:	Isolated	Final	Medial	Initial
Glyph form: (Help)	ٱ	ـٱ	ـٱ	ٱ

== Examples ==
1. وَٱسْمُ ٱبْنَتِهِ هِنْدُ (wa-smu bnati-hi hindu) — And his daughter's name is Hind.
2. يُرِيدُ أَنْ يَقْرَأَ لِإِحْدَى ٱبْنَتَيْهِ (yurīdu ʾan yaqraʾa li-ʾiḥdā bnatay-hi) — He wants to read to one of his two daughters.
3. مَا ٱسْمُكَ (mā smu-ka) — What is your name?
