= Monosyllabic language =

Language in which words mostly consist of a single syllable

A monosyllabic language is a language in which words predominantly consist of a single syllable. An example of a monosyllabic language would be Old Chinese or Vietnamese, Burmese or Sumerian.

Monosyllabism is the name for the property of single-syllable word form. The natural complement of monosyllabism is polysyllabism.

Whether a language is monosyllabic or not sometimes depends on the definition of "word", which is far from being a settled matter among linguists. For example, Modern Chinese (Mandarin) is "monosyllabic" if each written Chinese character is considered a word; which is justified by observing that most characters have proper meaning(s) (even if very generic and ambiguous). However, most entries in a Chinese dictionary are compounds of two or more characters; if those entries are taken as the "words", then Mandarin is not truly monosyllabic, only its morphemes are.

== Single-vowel form ==
A monosyllable may be complex and include seven or more consonants and a vowel (CCCCVCCC or CCCVCCC as in English "strengths") or be as simple as a single vowel or a syllabic consonant.

Few known recorded languages preserve simple CV forms which apparently are fully functional roots conveying established meaning, i.e. are words—but are not the reductions from earlier complex forms that we find in Mandarin Chinese CV forms, almost always derived with tonal and phonological modifications from Sino-Tibetan *(C)CV(C)(C)/(V) forms.

== Suffix and prefix ==
Monosyllabic languages typically lack suffixes and prefixes that can be added to words to alter their meaning or time. Instead, it is frequently determined by context and/or other words.

For instance in Vietnamese:

English	Vietnamese
I ask	Tôi hỏi
I asked	Tôi đã hỏi
I'm asking	Tôi đang hỏi

English	Vietnamese
explain	giải thích
unexplain	không giải thích
explanation	lời giải thích

For informal speech
English	Vietnamese
I promise.	Tôi hứa.
I promised yesterday.	Tôi hứa hôm qua.
I will promise tomorrow.	Tôi hứa ngày mai.
