= Terttu Nevalainen =

- Born: 31 May 1952 (age 74); Vuolijoki, Finland
- Education: University of Helsinki; University College London
- Scientific career
- Fields: Linguistics (historical)
- Workplaces: University of Helsinki

Terttu Nevalainen (born 31 May 1952, Vuolijoki) is a Finnish linguist and the current Chair of English Philology at the University of Helsinki. She has been a member of the Finnish Academy of Sciences since 2001 and was inducted as a First Class Knight of the Order of the White Rose of Finland in 2015. Nevalainen works on corpus linguistics, the history of English and historical sociolinguistics.

== Background and career ==
Nevalainen received a B.A. in English philology and general linguistics at the University of Helsinki in 1977, before going to University College London for postgraduate studies from 1980 to 1981. She then completed her Ph.L (1986) and Ph.D. (1991) at the University of Helsinki. She has since been a visiting scholar at the University of Cambridge and University of Sheffield.

Nevalainen is currently editor-in-chief of the monograph series Oxford Studies in the History of English and co-editor of the Advances in Historical Sociolinguistics journal. She is also currently building an open-access Language Change Database to facilitate statistical modelling and comparative sociolinguistic typologies. Since 1993, she has been leading the compilation of the Corpora of Early English Correspondence, which currently comprises 5.1 million words of Late Middle and Early Modern English from 1400 to 1800.

In 2002, a Festschrift entitled Variation Past and Present (Mémoires de la Société Néophilologique LXI), was complied in her honor by Raumolin-Brunberg, H. et al.

== Notable publications ==
- Nevalainen, T. (2006) An Introduction to Early Modern English. Edinburgh: Edinburgh University Press.
- Nevalainen, T. (ed.) & Traugott, E. (ed.) (2012) The Oxford Handbook of the History of English. Oxford & New York: Oxford University Press. (Oxford Handbooks in Linguistics)
- Nevalainen, T. & Raumolin-Brunberg, H. (2017) Historical sociolinguistics: Language change in Tudor and Stuart England. January 2017 (2nd rev. ed.) London: Routledge - Taylor & Francis Group.
