= Function word =

Words supplying mainly grammatical information, rather than content information

In linguistics, function words (also called functors) are words that have little lexical meaning or have ambiguous meaning and express grammatical relationships among other words within a sentence, or specify the attitude or mood of the speaker. They signal the structural relationships that words have to one another and are the glue that holds sentences together. Thus they form important elements in the structures of sentences.

Words that are not function words are called content words (or open class words, lexical words, or autosemantic words) and include nouns, most verbs, adjectives, and most adverbs, although some adverbs are function words (interrogative adverbs and relative adverbs). Dictionaries define the specific meanings of content words but can describe only the general usages of function words. By contrast, grammars describe the use of function words in detail but treat lexical words only in general terms.

Since it was first proposed in 1952 by C. C. Fries, the distinguishing of function/structure words from content/lexical words has been highly influential in the grammar used in second-language acquisition and English-language teaching.

== Overview ==
Function words might be prepositions, pronouns, auxiliary verbs, conjunctions, grammatical articles or particles, all of which belong to the group of closed-class words. Interjections are sometimes considered function words but they belong to the group of open-class words. Function words might or might not be inflected or might have affixes.

Function words belong to the closed class of words in grammar because it is very uncommon to have new function words created in the course of speech. In the open class of words, i.e., nouns, verbs, adjectives, or adverbs, new words may be added readily, such as slang words, technical terms, and adoptions and adaptations of foreign words.

Each function word either: gives grammatical information about other words in a sentence or clause, and cannot be isolated from other words; or gives information about the speaker's mental model as to what is being said.

Grammatical words, as a class, can have distinct phonological properties from content words. For example, in some of the Khoisan languages, most content words begin with clicks, but very few function words do. In English, very few words other than function words begin with the voiced th [ð]. English function words may be spelled with fewer than three letters; e.g., 'I', 'an', 'in', while non-function words usually are spelled with three or more (e.g., 'eye', 'Ann', 'inn').

The following is a list of the kind of words considered to be function words with English examples. They are all uninflected in English unless marked otherwise:

- articles — the and a. In some inflected languages, the articles may take on the case of the declension of the following noun.
- pronouns — he/him, she/her, etc. — inflected in English
- adpositions — in, under, towards, before, of, for, etc.
- co-ordinating conjunctions — and, or, but, etc.
- subordinating conjunctions — if, than, however, thus, etc.
- auxiliary verbs — would, could, should, etc. — inflected in English
- particles — up, on, down, out, etc.
- interjections — oh, ah, eh, etc. — sometimes called "filled pauses"
- expletives — indeed, friggin’, zounds, etc.
- sentence words — yes, no, okay, etc.

== See also ==
- Content word, words that name objects of reality and their qualities
- Grammaticalization, process by which words representing objects and actions transform to become grammatical markers
- Grammatical relation
