= Lexicalization =

Process of becoming a word or adding words to a language

In linguistics, lexicalization is the process of adding words, set phrases, or word patterns to a language's lexicon.

Whether word formation and lexicalization refer to the same process is controversial within the field of linguistics. Most linguists agree that there is a distinction, but there are many ideas of what the distinction is. Lexicalization may be simple, for example borrowing a word from another language, or more involved, as in calque or loan translation, wherein a foreign phrase is translated literally, as in marché aux puces, or in English, flea market.

Other mechanisms include compounding, abbreviation, and blending. Particularly interesting from the perspective of historical linguistics is the process by which ad hoc phrases become set in the language, and eventually become new words (see lexicon). Lexicalization contrasts with grammaticalization, and the relationship between the two processes is subject to some debate.

== In psycholinguistics ==
In psycholinguistics, lexicalization is the process of going from meaning to sound in speech production. The most widely accepted model, speech production, in which an underlying concept is converted into a word, is at least a two-stage process.

First, the semantic form (which is specified for meaning) is converted into a lemma, which is an abstract form specified for semantic and syntactic information (how a word can be used in a sentence), but not for phonological information (how a word is pronounced). The next stage is the lexeme, which is phonologically specified.

Some recent work has challenged this model, suggesting for example that there is no lemma stage, and that syntactic information is retrieved in the semantic and phonological stages.

== In sign languages ==
One way sign languages adopt new words is through fingerspelling, but in some cases these borrowings undergo a systemic transformation in form and meaning to become what are referred to as 'lexicalized signs' or 'loan signs.' These manual borrowings can act the same as other signs and can undergo regularly morphological changes. For example, regular, predictable changes may be made to hand shape and palm orientation. Similarly, movement and location of the sign may add grammatical information. Letters may also be elided or omitted. Lexicalized signs may also be developed from gestures related to handling an object.

== See also ==
- Lexical analysis
- Lexical semantics
- Linguistics
- Psycholinguistics
