= Drift (linguistics) =

Type of language change

Two types of language change can be characterized as linguistic drift: a unidirectional short-term and cyclic long-term drift.

== Short-term unidirectional drift ==
According to Sapir, drift is the unconscious change in natural language. He gives the example Whom did you see? which is grammatically correct but is generally replaced by Who did you see? Structural symmetry seems to have brought about the change: all other wh- words are monomorphic (consisting of only one morpheme). The drift of speech changes dialects and, in long terms, it generates new languages. Although it may appear these changes have no direction, in general they do. For example, in the English language, there was the Great Vowel Shift, a chain shift of long vowels first described and accounted for in terms of drift by Jespersen (1860–1943). Another example of drift is the tendency in English to eliminate the -er comparative formative and to replace it with the more analytic more. Thus, in some dialects one now regularly hears more kind and more happy instead of the prescriptive kinder, happier.

The underlying cause of drift may be entropy: the amount of disorder (differences in probabilities) inherent in all linguistic systems.

Another underlying cause of drift may be crosslinguistic influence (CLI) in situations of language contact. For example, in Shanghai Chinese (Shanghainese) it has been reported that vowel sounds have gradually changed over time due to the influence of Mandarin Chinese (Yao & Chang, 2016). At a shorter timescale (weeks of intensive exposure to a second language) as well, phonetic changes have been observed in an individual's native language; these changes, termed 'phonetic drift', generally approximate properties of the second language.

== Long-term cyclic drift ==
Cyclic drift is the mechanism of long-term evolution that changes the functional characteristics of a language over time, such as the reversible drifts from SOV word order to SVO and from synthetic inflection to analytic observable as typological parameters in the syntax of language families and of areal groupings of languages open to investigation over long periods of time. Drift in this sense is not language-specific but universal, a consensus achieved over two decades by universalists of the typological school as well as the generativist, notably by Greenberg (1960, 1963), Cowgill (1963), Wittmann (1969), Hodge (1970), Givón (1971), Lakoff (1972), Vennemann (1975) and Reighard (1978).

To the extent that a language's vocabulary is cast into the mould of a particular syntax and that the basic structure of the sentence is held together by functional items, with the lexical items filling in the blanks, syntactic change modifies most deeply the physiognomy of a particular language. Syntactic change affects grammar in its morphological and syntactic aspects and is seen as gradual, the product of chain reactions and subject to cyclic drift.

== See also ==
- Phonological change
- Phonemic differentiation
- Sound change
- Syntactic change
