= Grintovec (disambiguation) =

Grintovec is the highest mountain of the Kamnik–Savinja Alps, Slovenia.

Grintovec may also refer to:

- Grintovec, Ivančna Gorica, a settlement in Lower Carniola, Slovenia
- Grintovec, Kočevje, a remote abandoned settlement in Lower Carniola, Slovenia
- Grintovec, Koper, a small settlement in Littoral, Slovenia
