= Grintovec, Kočevje =

Grintovec
- Location in Slovenia
- Coordinates: 45°41′26.76″N 14°53′47.06″E
- Country: Slovenia
- Traditional region: Lower Carniola
- Statistical region: Southeast Slovenia
- Municipality: Kočevje
- Elevation: 479.1 m (1,572 ft)

Grintovec (pronounced [ˈɡɾiːntɔʋəts]; also Grintovec pri Kočevju; German: Grintowitz or Grintowitz bei Altlack; Gottscheerish: Grintəbitz) is a remote abandoned settlement in the Municipality of Kočevje in southern Slovenia. The area is part of the traditional region of Lower Carniola and is now included in the Southeast Slovenia Statistical Region. Its territory is now part of the village of Kleč.

== Name ==
The name Grintovec is shared with several other settlements (e.g., Grintovec, Grintovec pri Osilnici, etc.). The name is derived from the Slovene common noun grintavec 'snowy/rocky bare area', 'dolomite', a univerbation of the phrase grintav (svet) 'empty area, rough area'. Simonič also suggests that the name could be derived from the plant field scabious (Knautia arvensis), known as grintavec in Slovene and Grindkraut in German. The longer Slovene name Grintovec pri Kočevju means 'Grintovec near Kočevje'. The longer German name Grintowitz bei Altlack means 'Grintovec near Stari Log'.

== History ==
Grintovec was a Gottschee German village. In the land registry of 1574 it had two full farms divided into four half-farms, corresponding to a population between 10 and 15. In the 1770 census the settlement had seven houses. Before the Second World War the settlement had nine houses and a population of 46. Italian troops burned the area on 1 August 1942 during the Rog Offensive. After this the Executive Committee of the Liberation Front (IOOF) established a hut in the vicinity for an economics committee.
