= Phonological change =

Phenomenon in phonology

In historical linguistics, phonological change is any sound change that alters the distribution of phonemes in a language. In other words, a language develops a new system of oppositions among its phonemes. Old contrasts may disappear, new ones may emerge, or they may simply be rearranged. Sound change may be an impetus for changes in the phonological structures of a language (and likewise, phonological change may sway the process of sound change). One process of phonological change is rephonemicization, in which the distribution of phonemes changes by either addition of new phonemes or a reorganization of existing phonemes. Mergers and splits are types of rephonemicization and are discussed further below.

== Types ==
In a typological scheme first systematized by Henry M. Hoenigswald in 1965, a historical sound law can only affect a phonological system in one of three ways:

- Conditioned merger (which Hoenigswald calls "primary split"), in which some instances of phoneme A become an existing phoneme B; the number of phonemes does not change, only their distribution.
- Phonemic split (which Hoenigswald calls "secondary split"), in which some instances of A become a new phoneme B; this is phonemic differentiation in which the number of phonemes increases.
- Unconditioned merger, in which all instances of phonemes A and B become A; this is phonemic reduction, in which the number of phonemes decreases.

This classification does not consider mere changes in pronunciation, that is, phonetic change, even chain shifts, in which neither the number nor the distribution of phonemes is affected.

== Phonetic vs. phonological change ==
Phonetic change can occur without any modification to the phoneme inventory or phonemic correspondences. This change is purely allophonic or subphonemic. This can entail one of two changes: either the phoneme turns into a new allophone—meaning the phonetic form changes—or the distribution of allophones of the phoneme changes.

For the most part, phonetic changes are examples of allophonic differentiation or assimilation; i.e., sounds in specific environments acquire new phonetic features or perhaps lose phonetic features they originally had. Some examples are these: the devoicing of the vowels /i/ and /ɯ/ in certain environments in Japanese, the nasalization of vowels before nasals (common but not universal), and changes to the place of articulation of stops and nasals under the influence of adjacent vowels.

Phonetic change in this context refers to the lack of phonological restructuring, not a small degree of sound change. For example, chain shifts such as the Great Vowel Shift (in which nearly all of the vowels of the English language changed) or the allophonic differentiation of /s/, originally *[s], into [s z ʃ ʒ ʂ ʐ θ χ χʷ h], do not qualify as phonological change as long as all of the phones remain in complementary distribution.

Many phonetic changes provide the raw ingredients for later phonemic innovations. In Proto-Italic, for example, intervocalic */s/ became *[z]. It was a phonetic change, merely a mild and superficial complication in the phonological system, but when *[z] merged with */r/, the effect on the phonological system was greater. (The example will be discussed below, under conditioned merger.)

Similarly, in the prehistory of Indo-Iranian, the velars */k/ and */g/ acquired distinctively palatal articulation before front vowels (*/e/, */i/, */ē/ */ī/), so that */ke/ came to be pronounced *[t͡ʃe] and */ge/ *[d͡ʒe], but the phones *[t͡ʃ] and *[d͡ʒ] occurred only in that environment. However, when */e/, */o/, */a/ later fell together as Proto-Indo-Iranian */a/ (and */ē/ */ō/ */ā/ likewise fell together as */ā/), the result was that the allophonic palatal and velar stops now contrasted in identical environments: */ka/ and /ča/, /ga/ and /ǰa/, and so on. The difference became phonemic. (The "law of palatals" is an example of phonemic split.)

Sound changes generally operate for a limited period of time, and once established, new phonemic contrasts rarely remain tied to their ancestral environments. For example, Sanskrit acquired "new" /ki/ and /gi/ sequences via analogy and borrowing, and likewise /ču/, */ǰu/, /čm/, and similar novelties; and the reduction of the diphthong */ay/ to Sanskrit /ē/ had no effect at all on preceding velar stops.

== Merger ==
Phonemic merger is a loss of distinction between phonemes. Occasionally, the term reduction refers to phonemic merger. It is not to be confused with the meaning of the word "reduction" in phonetics, such as vowel reduction, but phonetic changes may contribute to phonemic mergers. For example, in most North American English dialects, the vowel in the word lot and vowel in the word palm have become the same sound and thus undergone a merger. In most dialects of England, the words father and farther are pronounced the same due to a merger created by non-rhoticity or "R-dropping".

=== Conditioned merger ===
Conditioned merger, or primary split, takes place when some, but not all, allophones of a phoneme, say A, merge with some other phoneme, B. The immediate results are these:

- there are the same number of contrasts as before.
- there are fewer words with A than before.
- there are more words with B than before.
- there is at least one environment in which A, for the time being, no longer occurs, called a gap in the distribution of the phoneme.
- if inflection or derivation results in A sometimes but not always being in the environment in which it has merged with B, an alternation in that environment between A and B may develop.

==== Example from Middle English ====
For a simple example, without alternation, early Middle English /d/ after stressed syllables followed by /r/ became /ð/: módor, fæder > mother, father, weder > weather. Since /ð/ was already a structure-point in the language, the innovation resulted merely in more /ð/ and less /d/ and a gap in the distribution of /d/ (though not a very conspicuous one).

Note 1: thanks to borrowing, from dialects as well as other languages, the original distribution has been disturbed: rudder, adder in Standard English (but forms with /ð/ are attested in nonstandard dialects).
Note 2: one who knows German can figure out which cases of English /ð/ were originally /ð/ and which changed from /d/. Original /d/ corresponds to /t/ in German, and original /ð/ corresponds to /d/. Thus, leather = German Leder, brother = Bruder, whether = weder, wether = Widder, pointing to original /ð/ in English; weather = German Wetter, father = Vater, mother = Mutter pointing to original /d/.
Note 3: alternation between /d/ and /ð/ would have been a theoretical possibility in English, as in sets like hard, harder; ride, rider, but any such details have been erased by the commonplace diachronic process called morphological leveling.

==== Devoicing of voiced stops in German ====
A trivial (if all-pervasive) example of conditioned merger is the devoicing of voiced stops in German when in word-final position or immediately before a compound boundary (see: Help:IPA/Standard German):

- *hand "hand" > /hant/ (cf. plural Hände /ˈhɛndə/)
- Handgelenk "wrist" /ˈhantɡəlɛŋk/
- *bund "league, association" > /bʊnt/ (cf. plural Bünde /ˈbʏndə/)
- *gold "gold" > /gɔlt/ (cf. golden "golden" /ˈɡɔldən/)
- *halb "half" > /halp/ (cf. halbieren "to halve" /halˈbiːʁən/)
- halbamtlich "semi-official" /ˈhalpʔamtlɪç/
- *berg "mountain" /bɛɐ̯k/ (cf. plural Berge /ˈbɛɐ̯ɡə/)
- *klug "clever, wise" > /kluːk/ (cf. fem. kluge /ˈkluːɡə/)

There were, of course, also many cases of original voiceless stops in final position: Bett "bed", bunt "colorful", Stock "(walking) stick, cane". To sum up: there are the same number of structure points as before, /p t k b d g/, but there are more cases of /p t k/ than before and fewer of /b d g/, and there is a gap in the distribution of /b d g/ (they are never found in word-final position or before a compound boundary).

Note 1: this split is easily recoverable by internal reconstruction because it results in alternations whose conditions are transparent. Thus Bund "bunch" (as of keys) /bʊnt/ has a plural Bünde /ˈbʏndə/ in contrast to bunt "colorful" with /t/ in all environments (feminine /ˈbʊntə/, neuter /ˈbʊntəs/ and so on). In a neutralizing environment, such as a voiceless stop in word-final position, one cannot tell which of two possibilities was the original sound. The choice is resolved if the corresponding segment can be found in a non-neutralizing position, as when a suffix follows. Accordingly, a non-inflected form like und /ʔʊnt/ "and" is historically opaque (though as the spelling hints, the /t/ was originally */d/).

Note 2: unlike most phonological changes, this one became a "surface" rule in German, so loan-words whose source had a voiced stop in the devoicing environment are taken into German with a voiceless one instead: Klub "club" (association) /klʊp/ from English club. The same goes for truncated forms: Bub (for formal Bube "boy") is /buːp/.

Note 2a: the surface alternation is what allows modern German orthography to write stops morphophonemically, thus Leib "loaf", Hand "hand", Weg "way", all with voiceless final stops in the simplex form and in compounds, but /b d g/ in inflected forms. In Old High and Middle High German, all voiceless stops were written as pronounced: hleip, hant, uuec and so on.

Note 3: the same distribution holds for /s/ vs. /z/, but it arose by a completely different process, the voicing of original */s/ between vowels: *mūs "mouse" > Maus /maʊs/, *mūsīz "mice" (for earlier *mūsiz) > Mäuse /ˈmɔʏzə/. Original long (now short) ss does not voice medially, as in küssen "to kiss" /ˈkʏsen/, nor does /s/ from Proto-West-Germanic *t, as in Wasser "water" /ˈvasɐ/, Fässer "kegs" /ˈfɛsɐ/ plural of Fass /fas/ (= English vat), müßig "idle" /ˈmyːsɪç/. German /ʃ/, as in Fisch "fish", reflects original *sk (in native words) and does not become voiced in any environment: Fischer "fisherman" /ˈfɪʃɐ/. (German has /ʒ/ only in loanwords: Genie /ʒeˈniː/ "genius", Gage /ˈɡaːʒə/ "salary".)

==== Rhotacism in Latin ====
More typical of the aftermath of a conditioned merger is the famous case of rhotacism in Latin (also seen in some Sabellian language spoken in the same area): Proto-Italic *s > Latin /r/ between vowels: *gesō "I do, act" > Lat. gerō (but perfect gessi < *ges-s- and participle gestus < *ges-to-, etc., with unchanged *s in all other environments, even in the same paradigm).

This sound law is quite complete and regular, and in its immediate wake there were no examples of /s/ between vowels except for a few words with a special condition (miser "wretched", caesariēs "bushy hair", diser(c)tus "eloquent": that is, rhotacism did not take place when an /r/ followed the *s). However, a new crop of /s/ between vowels soon arose from three sources. (1) a shortening of /ss/ after a diphthong or long vowel: causa "lawsuit" < *kawssā, cāsa "house' < *kāssā, fūsus "poured, melted" < *χewssos. (2) univerbation: nisi (nisī) "unless" < the phrase *ne sei, quasi (quasī) "as if" < the phrase *kʷam sei. (3) borrowings, such as rosa "rose" /rosa/, from a Sabellian source (the word is clearly somehow from Proto-Italic *ruθ- "red" but equally clearly not native Latin), and many words taken from or through Greek (philosophia, basis, casia, Mesopotamia, etc.).

==== Nasal assimilation and "gn" in Latin ====
A particular example of a conditioned merger in Latin is the rule whereby syllable-final stops, when followed by a nasal consonant, assimilated with it in nasality, while preserving their original point of articulation:

- *supimos > *supmos > summus "highest"
- *sabnyom > Samnium "Samnium" (a region in the southern Apennines)
- *swepnos > somnus "sleep"
- *atnos > annus "year"

In some cases, the underlying (pre-assimilation) root can be retrieved from related lexical items in the language: e.g. superior "higher"; Sabīni "Samnites"; sopor "(deep) sleep". For some words, only comparative evidence can help retrieve the original consonant: for example, the etymology of annus "year" (as *atnos) is revealed by comparison with Gothic aþna "year".

According to this rule of nasal assimilation, the sequences *-g-n and *-k-n would become [ŋn], with a velar nasal [ŋ]:

- *dek-no- > dignus [diŋnus] "worthy"
- *leg-no- (*leǵ- "gather") > lignum [liŋnum] "firewood"
- *teg-no- (*(s)teg- "build") > tignum [tiŋnum] "timber"
- *agʷnos > *ag-nos > agnus [aŋnus] "lamb"

The sound [ŋ] was not a phoneme of Latin, but an allophone of /g/ before /n/.

The sequence [ŋn] was regularly rendered in the orthography as |gn|. Some epigraphic inscriptions also feature non-standard spellings, e.g. SINNU for signum "sign, insigne", INGNEM for ignem "fire". These are witness to the speakers' hesitancy on how to best transcribe the sound [ŋ] in the sequence [ŋn].

The regular nasal assimilation of Latin can be seen as a form of "merger", insofar as it resulted in the contrast between oral stops (p, b, t, d) and nasal stops (m, n) being regularly neutralized.

==== Concerning the number of contrasts ====
One of the traits of conditioned merger, as outlined above, is that the total number of contrasts remains the same, but it is possible for such splits to reduce the number of contrasts. It happens if all of the conditioned merger products merge with one or another phoneme.

For example, in Latin, the Pre-Latin phoneme *θ (from Proto-Italic *tʰ < PIE *dh) disappears as such by merging with three other sounds: *f (from PIE *bh and *gʷh), *d, and *b:

Initially *θ > f:

- PItal. *tʰi-n-kʰ- "model, shape" > *θi-n-χ- > Lat. fingō (PIE root *dheyǵh- "smear, work with the hands"; cf. Sanskrit dihanti "they smear", Avestan daēza "wall" = Greek teîkhos; English dough < OE dāh besides dāg < PIE *dhoyǵh-)
- PItal. *tʰwor- "door" > *θwor- > Lat. forēs "door" (PIE *dhwor-; like most reflexes plural only; cf Eng. door < *dhur-, Greek thúrā (probably < *dhwor-) usually thúrai pl.)

Cf. Latin ferō "carry" < Proto-Italic *pʰer- < PIE *bher-; Latin frāter "brother" < Proto-Italic *pʰrātēr < PIE *bhre-H₂ter-

Medially adjacent to *l or *r, *θ becomes b:

- PItal. *wertʰom "word" > *werθom > *werðom (? *werβom) > Lat. verbum (cf. English word < *wurdaⁿ < PIE *wṛdhom, Lithuanian vaṙdas "name")
- PItal. *rutʰros "red" > *ruθros > *ruðros (? *ruβros) > Latin ruber (via *rubers < *rubrs < *rubros), cf. rubra fem. rubrum neut.
- PItal. *-tʰlo-/*-tʰlā- "tool suffix" > Latin -bulum, -bula: PIE *peH₂-dhlo- "nourishment" > PItal. *pā-tʰlo- > *pāθlo- > Latin pābulum; PIE *suH-dhleH₂- "sewing implement" > PItal. *sūtʰlā > *sūθlā > Latin sūbula "cobbler's awl"

Intervocalic Latin -b- is from PIE *bh, *s, and (rarely and problematically) *b: Lat. ambō "both" < PIE *ambh- or *H₂embh- (cf. Greek amphi-); Lat. crābrō "hornet" < *ḱṛHs-ron- (cf. Vedic śīrṣn- "hornet"); Lat. cannabis "hemp" (cf. Old English hænep "hemp"). The change of *-sr- to -br- is itself presumably via *-θr- > *-ðr- > *-βr-.

Elsewhere, *θ becomes d:

- PItal. *metʰyo- "middle" > *meθyo- > Pre-Lat. *meðyo- > Lat. medius (three syllables; PIE *medhyo-, cf. Sanskrit madhya-, Greek més(s)os < *meth-yo-)
- PItal. *pʰeytʰ- > *feyθ- > *feyð- > Lat. fīdus "trusting" (cf. Greek peíthomai "am persuaded", English bid "order, ask")

Intervocalic -d- in Latin comes from PIE *d in ped- "foot", sīdere "to sit down", cord- "heart"

There is no alternation to give away the historical story, there, via internal reconstruction; the evidence for these changes is almost entirely from comparative reconstruction. That reconstruction makes it easy to unriddle the story behind the weird forms of the Latin paradigm jubeō "order", jussī perfect, jussus participle. If the root is inherited, it would have to have been PIE *yewdh-.

=== Unconditioned merger ===
Unconditioned merger, that is, complete loss of a contrast between two or more phonemes, is not very common. Most mergers are conditioned. That is, most apparent mergers of A and B have an environment or two in which A did something else, such as drop or merge with C.

Typical is the unconditioned merger seen in the Celtic conflation of the PIE plain voiced series of stops with the breathy-voiced series: *bh, *dh, *ǵh, *gh are indistinguishable in Celtic etymology from the reflexes of *b *d *ǵ *g. The collapse of the contrast cannot be stated in whole-series terms because the labiovelars do not co-operate. PIE *gʷ everywhere falls together with the reflexes of *b and *bh as Proto-Celtic *b, but *gʷh seems to have become PCelt. *gʷ, lining up with PCelt. *kʷ < PIE *kʷ.

==== Examples ====
- OE /y/ and /y:/(short and long high front rounded vowels) fell together with /i/ and /i:/ via a simple phonetic unrounding: OE hypp, cynn, cyssan, brycg, fyllan, fýr, mýs, brýd became modern hip, kin, kiss, bridge, fill, fire, mice, bride. There is no way to tell by inspection whether a modern /i/ or /ay/ goes back to a rounded or an unrounded vowel. The change is not even reflected in modern spelling since it took place too early to be captured in Middle English spelling conventions. Of course, current spellings like type, thyme, psyche, etc., have nothing to do with OE y = /y/.
- There is a massive, consistent body of evidence that PIE *l and *r merged totally in Proto-Indo-Iranian, as did PIE *e *o *a into Proto-Indo-Iranian *a.
- The evolution of Romance shows a systematic collection of unconditioned mergers in connection with the loss of Latin vowel length. Latin had ten vowels, five long and five short (i, ī; e, ē; a, ā; and so on). In the variety of Romance underlying Sardo and some other dialects of the islands, the ten vowels simply fell together pairwise: in no way are Latin e, ē, say, reflected differently. In Proto-Western-Romance, the ancestor of French, Iberian, Italian north of the Spezia-Rimini line, etc., however, things happened differently: Latin /a ā/ merged totally, as in Sardo, but the other vowels all behaved differently. Upon losing the feature of length, Latin /ī ū/ merged with nothing, but the short high vowels, front and back, merged with the long mid vowels: thus, Latin /i ē/ are uniformly reflected as PWRom. *ẹ (in the standard Romance notation), and /u ō/ become *ọ. PWRom. *ẹ is reflected in French (in open syllables) as /wa/ (spelled oi); voile "sail", foin "hay", doigt "finger", quoi "what", are from Latin vēlum, fēnum, digitus (via *dictu), quid, respectively. There is no way of telling in French which one of the two Latin vowels is the source of any given /wa/.

Another example is provided by Japonic languages. Old Japanese had eight vowels; that inventory has been reduced to five in modern Japanese.

== Split ==
In a split (Hoenigswald's "secondary split"), a new contrast arises when allophones of a phoneme cease being in complementary distribution and are therefore necessarily independent structure points, i.e., contrastive. This mostly comes about because of some loss of distinctiveness in the environment of one or more allophones of a phoneme.

A simple example is the rise of the contrast between nasal and oral vowels in French. A full account of this history is complicated by the subsequent changes in the phonetics of the nasal vowels, but the development can be compendiously illustrated via the present-day French phonemes /a/ and /ã/:

- Step 1: *a > *ã when a nasal immediately follows: *čantu "song" > [tʃãntu] (still phonemically /tʃantu/);
- Step 2: at some point in the history of French when speakers consistently stopped making an oral closure with the tongue, we had [tʃãt], that is /tʃãt/ (if not /ʃãt/) and finally, with the loss of the final stop, modern French /ʃã/ chant "song", distinct from French /ʃa/ chat "cat" solely by the contrast between the nasal and the oral articulation of the vowels. This distinction is exhibited thus in many other forms in which /a/ and /ã/ contrast.

Note 1: the nasalization of a vowel before a nasal is found very widely in the world's languages, but is not at all universal. In modern French, for example, vowels before a nasal are oral. That they used to be nasalized, like the vowels before lost nasals, is indicated by certain phonetic changes not always reflected in the orthography: Fr. femme "woman" /fam/ (with the lowering of [ɛ̃] (nasalized [ɛ]) to *ã prior to denasalization).

Note 2: unusually for a split, the history of the French innovation, even including some changes in vowel cavity features, can be readily inferred by internal reconstruction. This is because the contrastive feature [nasal] in a vowel system usually has a nasal in its history, which makes for straightforward surmises. There are also clear alternations, as /bɔ̃/ "good" (masc.) vs. /bɔn/ (fem.), while such pairs as /fin/ "fine" (fem.) and /fɛ̃/ (masc.) together with derivatives like raffiné /rafine/ "refined" indicate what happened to nasalized *i.

Phonemic split was a major factor in the creation of the contrast between voiced and voiceless fricatives in English. Originally, to oversimplify a bit, Old English fricatives were voiced between voiced sounds and voiceless elsewhere. Thus /f/ was [f] in fisc [fiʃ] "fish", fyllen "to fill" [fyllen], hæft "prisoner", ofþyrsted [ofθyrsted] "athirst", líf "life", wulf "wolf". But in, say, the dative singular of "life", that is lífe, the form was [li:ve] (as in English alive, being an old prepositional phrase on lífe); the plural of wulf, wulfas, was [wulvas], as still seen in wolves. The voiced fricative is typically seen in verbs, too (often with variations in vowel length of diverse sources): gift but give, shelf but shelve. Such alternations are to be seen even in loan words, as proof vs prove (though not as a rule in borrowed plurals, thus proofs, uses, with voiceless fricatives).

Note 1: unlike the French example, there is no chance of recovering the historical source of the alternations in English between /s θ f/ and /z ð v/ merely through inspection of the modern forms. The conditioning factor (original location of the voiced alternants between vowels, for example) is quite lost and the investigator has little reason even to suspect the original state of affairs; and anyway the original distributions have been much disturbed by analogical leveling. Worthy and (in some dialects) greasy have voiced fricative (next to the voiceless ones in worth and grease) but adjectives in -y otherwise do not alternate: bossy, glassy, leafy, earthy, breathy, saucy, etc (cf. glaze, leaves, breathe, and note that even in dialects with /z/ in greasy, the verb to grease always has /s/).

Note 2: the phoneme /ʃ/ does not alternate with /ʒ/ (and never did). In native words, /ʃ/ is from *sk, and either the change of this sequence to /ʃ/ postdated the rearranging of voicing in pre-Old English fricatives, or else it was phonetically long between vowels, originally, much like the /ʃ/ of present-day Italian (pesce "fish" is phonetically [peʃːe]); and long fricatives, just like sequences of fricatives, were always voiceless in Old English, as in cyssan "to kiss". The Early Modern English development of /ʃ/ < */sj/, as in nation, mission, assure, long postdated the period when fricatives became voiced between vowels.

Note 3: a common misstatement of cases like OE /f/ > Modern English /f, v/ is that a "new phoneme" has been created. Not so. A new contrast has been created. Both NE /f/ and /v/ are new phonemes, differing in phonetic specifications and distribution from OE /f/. Without doubt, one component in this misunderstanding is the orthography. If, instead of speaking of the development of Old English /f/ we said that OE /ɰ/ split into /f/ and /v/ there would presumably be less confused talk of "a" new phoneme arising in the process.

== Loss ==
In Hoenigswald's original scheme, loss, the disappearance of a segment, or even of a whole phoneme, was treated as a form of merger, depending on whether the loss was conditioned or unconditioned. The "element" that a vanished segment or phoneme merged with was "zero".

The situation in which a highly inflected language has formations without any affix at all (Latin alter "(the) other", for example) is quite common; but alter (nominative singular masculine) is the only one of the 30 forms (altera nominative singular feminine, alterum accusative singular masculine, etc.) that make up the paradigm that is not explicitly marked with endings for gender, number, and case.

From a historical perspective, there is no problem since alter is from *alteros (overtly nominative singular and masculine), with the regular loss of the short vowel after *-r- and the truncation of the resulting word-final cluster *-rs. Descriptively, however, it is problematic to say that the "nominative singular masculine" is signaled by the absence of any affix. It is simpler to view alter as more than what it looks like, /alterØ/, "marked" for case, number, and gender by an affix, like the other 29 forms in the paradigm. It is merely that the "marker" in question is not a phoneme or sequence of phonemes but the element /Ø/.

Along the way, it is hard to know when to stop positing zeros and whether to regard one zero as different from another. For example, is the zero not-marking can (as in he can) as "third person singular" the same zero that not-marks deer as "plural", or are both basically a single morphological placeholder? If it is determined that there is a zero on the end of deer in three deer, it is uncertain whether English adjectives agree with the number of the noun they modify, using the same zero affix. (Deictics do so: compare this deer, these deer.) In some theories of syntax it is useful to have an overt marker on a singular noun in a sentence such as My head hurts because the syntactic mechanism needs something explicit to generate the singular suffix on the verb. Thus, all English singular nouns may be marked with yet another zero.

It seems possible to avoid all those issues by considering loss as a separate basic category of phonological change, and leave zero out of it.

As stated above, one can regard loss as both a kind of conditioned merger (when only some expressions of a phoneme are lost) and a disappearance of a whole structure point. The former is much more common than the latter.

- In Latin are many consonant clusters that lose a member or two such as these: tostus "toasted, dried" < *torstos, multrum "milking stool" < *molktrom, scultus "carved" < *scolptos, cēna "dinner" < *kertsnā, lūna "moon" < *louwksnā ("lantern" or the like).
- Greek lost all stops from the end of a word (so *kʷit "what" > Greek ti, *deḱṃt "ten" > déka, *wanakt "O prince" > ána), but stops generally survive elsewhere. PIE *s drops medially between voiced sounds in Greek but is preserved in final position and in some consonant clusters.
- Old English [x] (voiceless velar fricative) is everywhere lost as such, but usually leaves traces behind (transphonologization). In "furrow" (from furh) and "marrow" (from mearh), it vocalizes. It is elided (with varying effects on the preceding vowel, such as lengthening) in night, knight, might, taught, naught, freight, fought, plow (Brit. plough, OE plōh), bought, through, though, slaughter; but yields /f/ in laugh, trough, tough, enough (and daughter can be found in The Pilgrim's Progress rhyming with after, and the spelling dafter is actually attested) The /x/ phoneme still exists in some onomatopoeiac words, like "ugh" (note the spelling uses gh, which indicates that when they were coined, there was still some understanding of the phonemic meaning of gh), "yech" and "chutzpah".
- /g k/ are lost in English in word-initial position before /n/: gnaw, gnat, knight, know. /t/ is lost after fricatives before nasals and /l/: soften, castle, bristle, chestnut, Christmas, hasten
- In many words, /f/ (that is, Old English [v]) was lost between vowels: auger, hawk, newt < OE nafogar, hafoc, efete ("lizard"), and in some alternative (poetic) forms: e'en "evening", o'er "over", e'er "ever"; Scottish siller "silver", and others.

The ends of words often have sound laws that apply there only, and many such special developments consist of the loss of a segment. The early history and prehistory of English has seen several waves of loss of elements, vowels and consonants alike, from the ends of words, first in Proto-Germanic, then to Proto-West-Germanic, then to Old and Middle and Modern English, shedding bits from the ends of words at every step of the way. There is in Modern English next to nothing left of the elaborate inflectional and derivational apparatus of PIE or of Proto-Germanic because of the successive ablation of the phonemes making up these suffixes.

Total unconditional loss is, as mentioned, not very common. Latin /h/ appears to have been lost everywhere in all varieties of Proto-Romance except Romanian. Proto-Indo-European laryngeals survived as consonants only in Anatolian languages but left plenty of traces of their former presence (see laryngeal theory).

== Phonemic differentiation ==
Phonemic differentiation is the phenomenon of a language maximizing the acoustic distance between its phonemes.

=== Examples ===
For example, in many languages, including English, most front vowels are unrounded, while most back vowels are rounded. There are no languages in which all front vowels are rounded and all back vowels are unrounded. The most likely explanation for this is that front vowels have a higher second formant (F2) than back vowels, and unrounded vowels have a higher F2 than rounded vowels. Thus unrounded front vowels and rounded back vowels have maximally different F2s, enhancing their phonemic differentiation.

Phonemic differentiation can have an effect on diachronic sound change. In chain shifts, phonemic differentiation is maintained, while in phonemic mergers it is lost. Phonemic splits involve the creation of two phonemes out of one, which then tend to diverge because of phonemic differentiation.

=== Chain shifts ===
In a chain shift, one phoneme moves in acoustic space, causing other phonemes to move as well to maintain optimal phonemic differentiation. An example from American English is the Northern Cities Vowel Shift , where the raising of /æ/ has triggered a fronting of /ɑ/, which in turn has triggered a lowering of /ɔ/, and so forth.

=== Phonemic mergers ===
If a phoneme moves in acoustic space, but its neighbors do not move in a chain shift, a phonemic merger may occur. In that case, a single phoneme results where an earlier stage of the language had two phonemes (that is also called phonetic neutralization). A well known example of a phonemic merger in American English is the cot–caught merger by which the vowel phonemes /ɑ/ and /ɔ/ (illustrated by the words cot and caught respectively) have merged into a single phoneme in some accents.

=== Phonemic splits ===
In a phonemic split, a phoneme at an earlier stage of the language is divided into two phonemes over time. Usually, it happens when a phoneme has two allophones appearing in different environments, but sound change eliminates the distinction between the two environments. For example, in umlaut in the Germanic languages, the back vowels /u, o/ originally had front rounded allophones [y, ø] before the vowel /i/ in a following syllable. When sound change caused the syllables containing /i/ to be lost, a phonemic split resulted, making /y, ø/ distinct phonemes.

It is sometimes difficult to determine whether a split or a merger has happened if one dialect has two phonemes corresponding to a single phoneme in another dialect; diachronic research is usually required to determine the dialect that is conservative and the one that is innovative.

When phonemic change occurs differently in the standard language and in dialects, the dialect pronunciation is considered nonstandard and may be stigmatized. In descriptive linguistics, however, the question of which splits and mergers are prestigious and which are stigmatized is irrelevant. However, such stigmatization can lead to hypercorrection, when the dialect speakers attempt to imitate the standard language but overshoot, as with the foot–strut split, where failing to make the split is stigmatized in Northern England, and speakers of non-splitting accents often try to introduce it into their speech, sometimes resulting in hypercorrections such as pronouncing pudding /pʌdɪŋ/.

Occasionally, speakers of one accent may believe the speakers of another accent to have undergone a merger, when there has really been a chain shift.

== See also ==
- Chain shift
- Drift (linguistics)
- Language change
- Phonological history of English consonants
- Phonological history of English vowels
- Phonological history of English
- Sound change
- Vowel shift
