= Smuka =

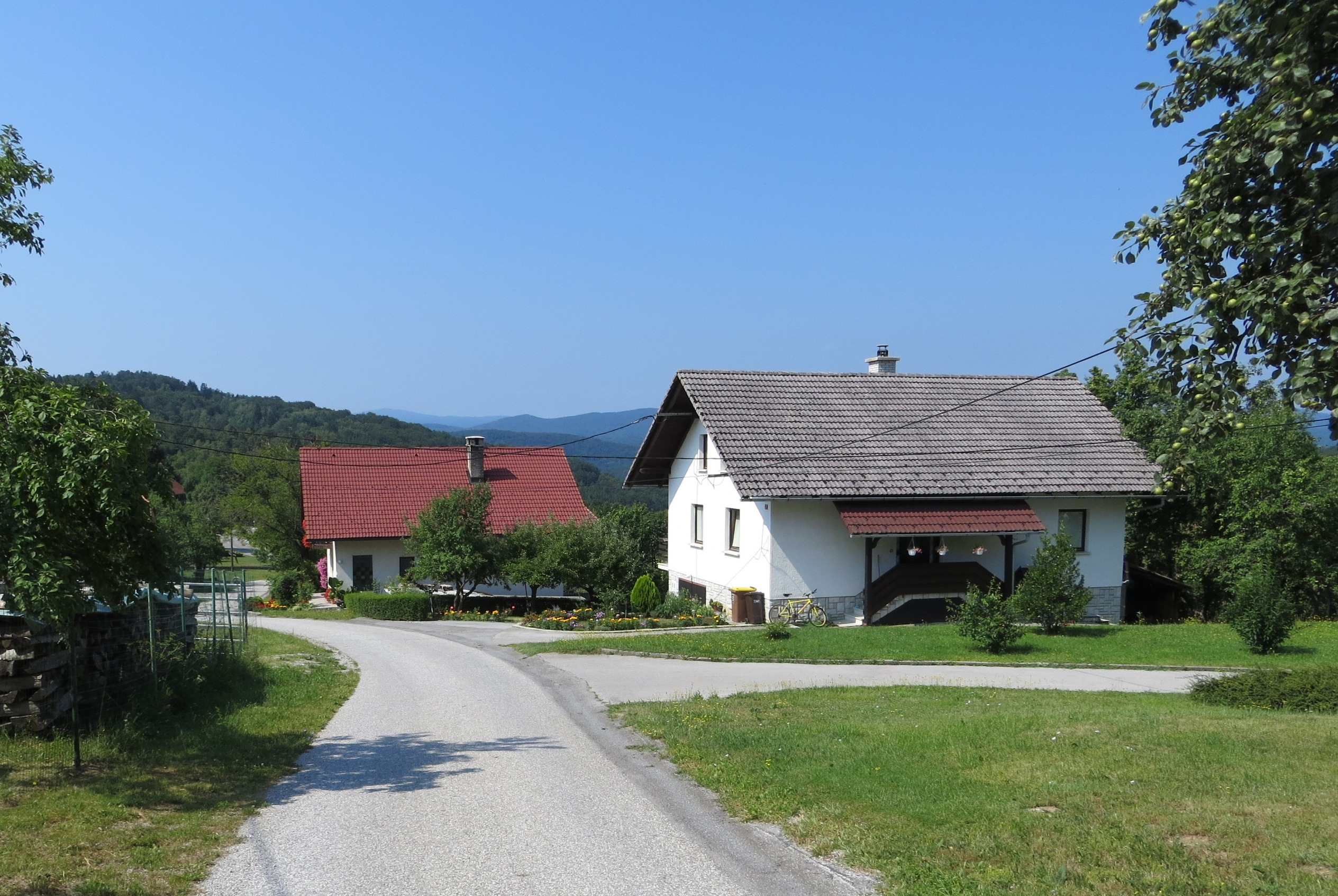

- Location in Slovenia
- Coordinates: 45°45′41.84″N 14°55′49.57″E
- Country: Slovenia
- Traditional region: Lower Carniola
- Statistical region: Southeast Slovenia
- Municipality: Kočevje

Area
  - Total: 10.43 km^{2} (4.03 sq mi)
- Elevation: 476.8 m (1,564 ft)

Population (2002)
  - Total: 46
- Postal code: 1332

Smuka (pronounced [ˈsmuːka]; in older sources also Smuk, German: Langenton or Langenthon, Gottscheerish: Zmuk) is a settlement in the Municipality of Kočevje in southern Slovenia. It was a village inhabited by Gottschee Germans. In 1941 at the beginning of the Second World War its original population was evicted. The area is part of the traditional region of Lower Carniola and is now included in the Southeast Slovenia Statistical Region. A cave known as Štavka or Štibloh (German: Stübloch) is located near the village, in the direction of Stari Log.

== Name ==
The linguist Fran Ramovš suggested that the Slovene name Smuka refers to 'sloping, raised terrain', echoing a similar observation by Hans Tschinkel. The German name Langenthon is derived from the permission given to settle by the langen Thonen (literally, the 'big fir forest'; cf. German Tanne 'fir').

== History ==
Smuka was a Gottschee German settlement. It was not mentioned in the land registry of 1574 because it was one of the more recent settlements in the Gottschee enclave. It was established in 1614 on the basis of a 1605 deed from Countess Elizabeth von Blagay, when nine farmers from Stari Log were permitted to clear the forest in an area equivalent to the size of three full farms. In the census of 1770, there were 26 houses in the village. Before the Second World War, the village had 52 houses and a population of 270. At that time, the economy of the village was based on farming, peddling, and selling firewood and timber. There was an inn in the village. The entire village except for the church was burned by Italian forces on 15 August 1942. After the war, some new houses were built in the village. Crop production was made more difficult by wild animals, and dairy production was significant. Much of the population commuted to Kočevje to work.

== Church ==
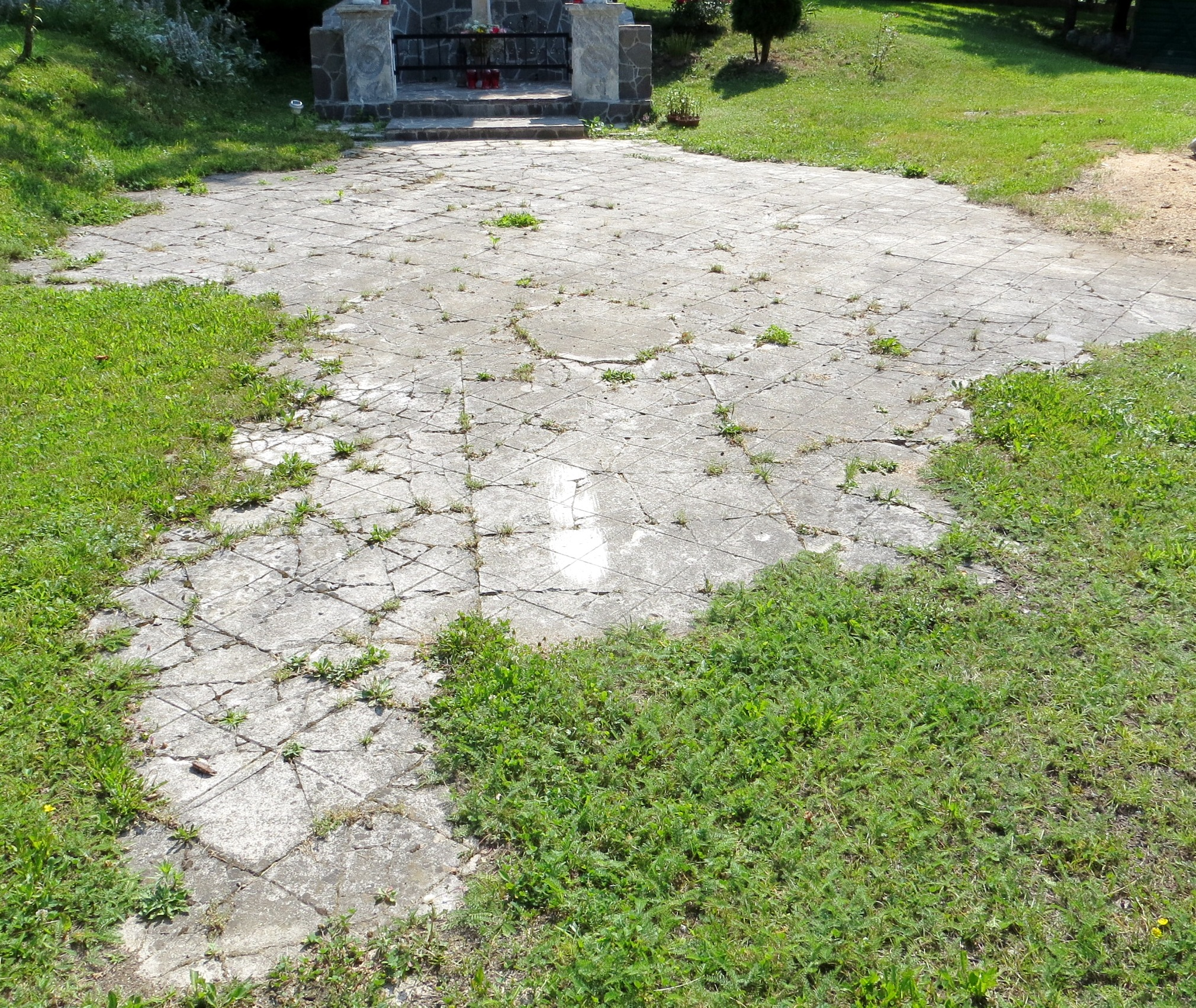
Remnants of flooring and altar posts of Saint Roch's Church

The local church, dedicated to Saint Roch, was a 16th-century building to which a belfry was added in the 19th century. It was damaged by fire during the Second World War, and was demolished in 1954. The site is marked by a cross and some remnants of the building. The cross was erected in a ceremony on 12 August 2007.
