= Typological Studies in Language =

Book series

Typological Studies in Language (or TSL) is a series of books published for academics in linguistic typology by John Benjamins Publishing Company since 1982. Joseph H. Greenberg was honorary editor and Talmy Givón general editor at the inception of the series. Michael Noonan was general editor from 1995 to 2009, being succeeded by Spike Gildea.

== See also ==
- Typology

== Bibliography ==
- Hopper, Paul J. (editor). Tense-Aspect: between Semantics and Pragmatics; containing the contributions to a symposium on tense and aspect, held at UCLA, May 1979. TSL 1. 1982.
- Givón, Talmy (editor). Topic Continuity in Discourse. TSL 3. 1983.
- Givón, Talmy and Masayoshi Shibatani. Syntactic Complexity: Diachrony, Acquisition, Neuro-Cognition, Evolution. TSL 85. 2009.
