= Syntactic change =

Concept in linguistics

In the field of linguistics, syntactic change is change in the syntactic structure of a natural language.

== Description ==
If one regards a language as vocabulary within a particular syntax (with functional items maintaining the basic structure of a sentence and with the lexical items filling in the blanks), syntactic change plays the greatest role in modifying the physiognomy of a particular language. Syntactic change affects grammar in its morphological and syntactic aspects and is one of the types of change observed in language change.

If one pays close attention to evolutions in the realms of phonology and morphology, it becomes evident that syntactic change can also be the result of profound shifts in the shape of a language. The effect of phonological change can trigger morphological reanalysis, which can then engender changes in syntactic structures.

Syntactic change is a phenomenon creating a shift in language patterns over time and is subject to cyclic drift. The morphological idiosyncrasies of today are seen as the outcome of yesterday's regular syntax. For instance, in English, the past tense of the verb to go is not goed or any other form based on the base go but went, a borrowing from the past tense of the verb to wend.

Massive changes may occur both in syntax and vocabulary and are attributable to either creolization or relexification. Some theories of language change hypothesize that it occurs because the grammatical input that children receive is ambiguous and so they analyze the underlying grammatical construction in a different manner. The reanalyzed grammar may create new ambiguities, which subsequent generations may analyze in another manner.

In some cases, change can happen in a cyclic manner. For example, prepositions can become reduced over time until they are reanalyzed as case markers affixed onto the adjacent nouns. The case markers, in turn, may be lost over time, which will lead to the introduction of new prepositions.

An example of syntactic change in English can be seen in the development from the verb second (V2) word order, which was used before the 15th century, to the modern word order. Like other Germanic languages, Old and Middle English had V2 word order. An example from Middle English is shown here, where nu 'now' is in first position, and the verb loke 'look' is in second position.

(1)	Nu	loke	euerich	man	toward	himsuelen.
	Now	look	every	man	to	himself

'Now it's for every man to look to himself.' (as cited in Roberts 2007: 59)

Even though V2 was lost, verb raising was maintained in the 1600s in Early Modern English. Unlike in Modern English, the verb preceded adverbs and negation, as shown in (2). That word order is still apparent in Shakespeare's writing.

(2)	if I gave not this accompt to you
	'if I didn't give this account to you' (1557: J. Cheke, Letter to Hoby; Görlach 1991: 223, as cited in Roberts 2007: 57)

== See also ==
- Language change
- Creole language
- Relexification
