= Kleč, Kočevje =

Kleč
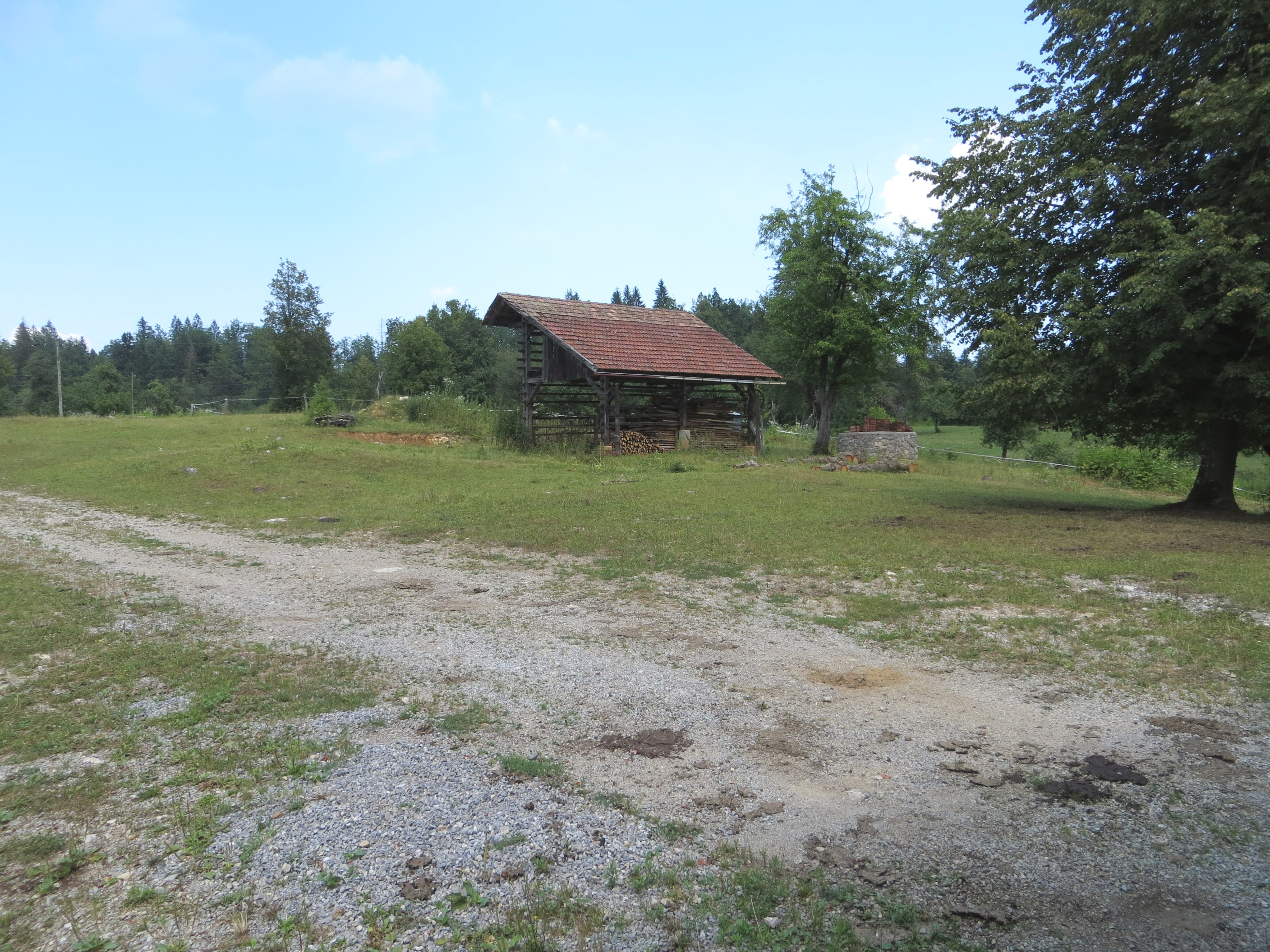

- Location in Slovenia
- Coordinates: 45°42′28″N 14°53′11.68″E
- Country: Slovenia
- Traditional region: Lower Carniola
- Statistical region: Southeast Slovenia
- Municipality: Kočevje

Area
  - Total: 5.18 km^{2} (2.00 sq mi)

Population (2002)
  - Total: 0

Kleč (pronounced [ˈkleːtʃ]; in older sources also Kleče, German: Kletsch, also Kletsch bei Altlack) is a settlement in the Municipality of Kočevje in southern Slovenia. The area is part of the traditional region of Lower Carniola and is now part of the Southeast Slovenia Statistical Region. It no longer has any permanent residents.

== Name ==
The origin of the name Kleč is uncertain. Snoj observes that settlements named Kleč(e) generally lie along rivers and he connects this with the Slovene common noun kleč 'sandy or gravely river bank; gravely area covered with thin soil', referring to the local geology. Bezlaj also mentions the possibility of derivation from *klękъ 'small branching hills'. Another possibility is that it is derived from kleč with the meaning 'cliff'. Petschauer suggests that the name is derived from klet with the meaning 'shed, shack'.

== History ==
Kleč was a Gottschee German village. In the land registry of 1574 it had four full farms divided into eight half-farms, corresponding to a population between 35 and 40. In the 1770 census there were 23 houses in the village. Kleč had a maximum population of 125 in 1880, which gradually decreased due to emigration. Before the Second World War, the village had 21 houses and a population of 89. At that time, the economy of the village was based on farming, making wooden tubs, troughs, shovels, and railway ties, selling firewood, lumber, and logs, and gathering berries. There was an inn in the settlement. The original inhabitants were evicted on 23 and 24 November 1941. In August 1942 Italian troops burned the village and now it is difficult to discern the traces of the former houses. The village was not rebuilt after the war, and the meadows were used by the Kočevje collective farm. Since about 1990 the farmland has been worked by the Robida family of Stari Log. A sign with information about the village in Slovenian, German, and English was erected at the site of the former church in 2012.

== Church ==
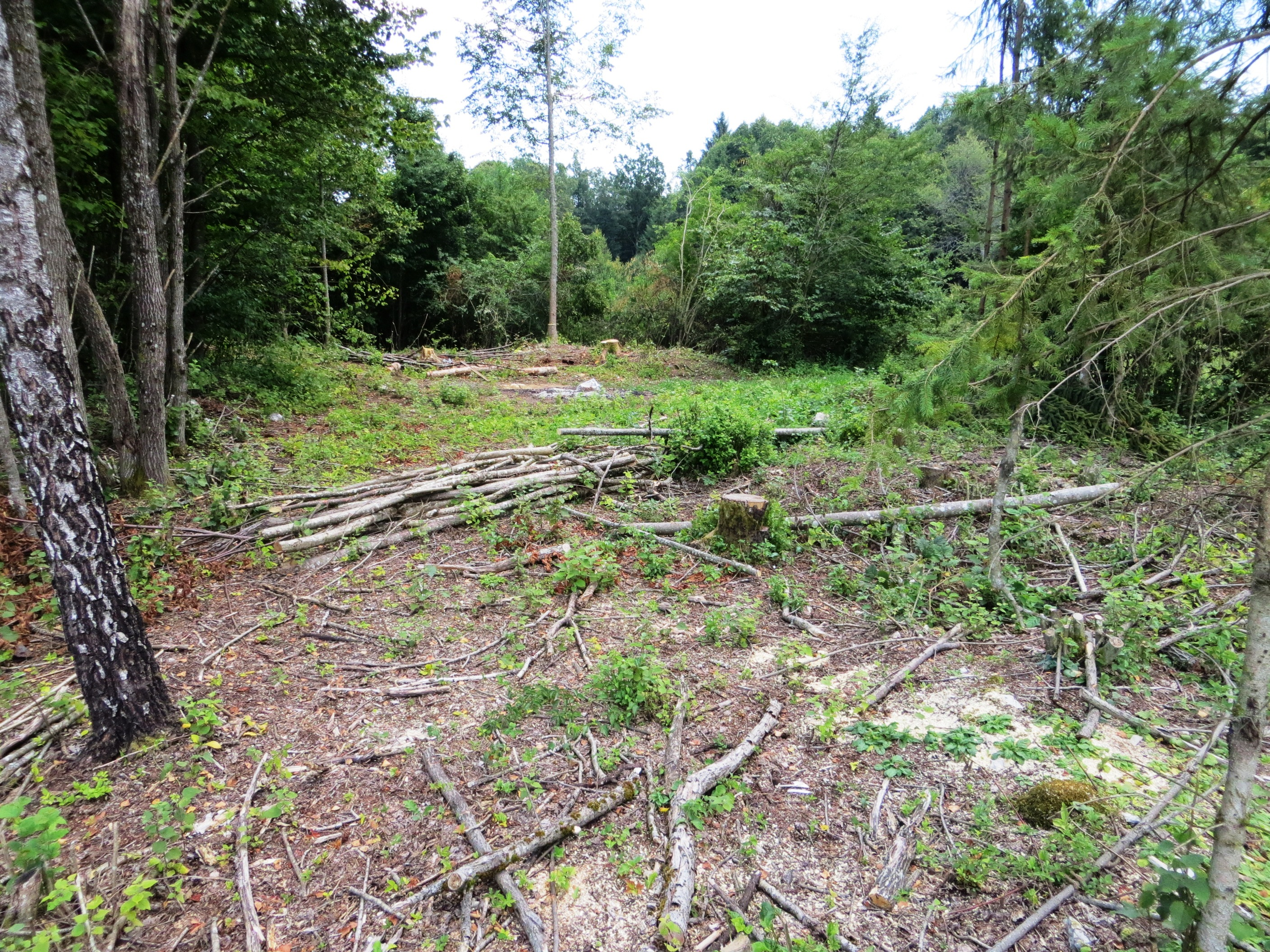
Site of Saint Andrew's Church

The church in Kleč was a chapel of ease dedicated to Saint Andrew. It stood at the southeast edge of the village. It probably dated to the mid-16th century and was mentioned in visitation records dating to 1753. It had a rectangular nave, a painted wooden ceiling, and a vaulted chancel walled on three sides. There was a square stone belfry. The church and its furnishings were burned in 1943. The site of the former church is registered as cultural heritage.
