= Word order =

Order of syntactic constituents

word order
- video about subject-verb-object order
- Field: linguistics
- Origin: Language Universals and Linguistic Typology: Syntax and Morphology
- Key people: Bernard Comrie
- Purpose: Studying and classifying language samples and languages by the ordering of grammatical elements

In linguistics, word order (also known as linear order) is the order of the syntactic constituents of a language. Word order typology studies it from a cross-linguistic perspective, and examines how languages employ different orders. Correlations between orders found in different syntactic sub-domains are also of interest.

== Order types ==
The primary word orders that are of interest are

- the constituent order of a clause, namely the relative order of subject, object, and verb;
- the order of modifiers (adjectives, numerals, demonstratives, possessives, and adjuncts) in a noun phrase;
- the order of adverbials.

Some languages use relatively fixed word order, often relying on the order of constituents to convey grammatical information. Other languages—often those that convey grammatical information through inflection—allow more flexible word order, which can be used to encode pragmatic information, such as topicalisation or focus. However, even languages with flexible word order have a preferred or basic word order, with other word orders considered "marked".

Constituent word order is defined in terms of a finite verb (V) in combination with two arguments, namely the subject (S), and object (O). Subject and object are here understood to be nouns, since pronouns often tend to display different word order properties. Thus, a transitive sentence has six logically possible basic word orders:

- about 45% of the world's languages employ subject–object–verb order (SOV);
- about 42% of the world's languages employ subject–verb–object order (SVO);
- a smaller fraction of languages employ verb–subject–object (VSO) order;
- the remaining three arrangements are rarer: verb–object–subject (VOS) is slightly more common than object–verb–subject (OVS), and object–subject–verb (OSV) is the rarest by a significant margin.

== Constituent word orders ==
These are all possible word orders for the subject, object, and verb in the order of most common to rarest (the examples use "she" as the subject, "loves" as the verb, and "him" as the object):

- SOV is the order used by the largest number of distinct languages; languages using it include Japanese, Korean, Mongolian, Turkish, the Indo-Aryan languages and the Dravidian languages. Some, like Persian, Latin and Quechua, have SOV (Subject-Object-Verb) normal word order but conform less to the general tendencies of other such languages. A sentence glossing as "She him loves" would be grammatically correct in these languages.
- SVO languages include Arabic (dialects), English, Spanish, Portuguese, Bulgarian, Macedonian, Serbo-Croatian, the Chinese languages and Swahili, among others. "She loves him."
- VSO languages include Ancient Egyptian, Biblical Hebrew, Classical Arabic, the Insular Celtic languages, Mayan, and the Philippine languages. "Loves she him."
- VOS languages include Fijian and Malagasy. "Loves him she."
- OVS languages include Hixkaryana. "Him loves she."
- OSV languages include Xavante and Warao. "Him she loves."

Sometimes patterns are more complex: some Germanic languages, like German and Dutch, have SOV (Subject-object-verb) in subordinate clauses, but V2 word order in main clauses, SVO word order being the most common. Using the guidelines above, the unmarked word order is then SVO.

Many synthetic languages such as Arabic, Latin, Greek, Persian, Romanian, Assyrian, Assamese, Russian, Turkish, Korean, Japanese, Finnish, and Basque have no strict word order; rather, the sentence structure is highly flexible and reflects the pragmatics of the utterance. However, also in languages of this kind there is usually a pragmatically neutral constituent order that is most commonly encountered in each language.

Topic-prominent languages organize sentences to emphasize their topic–comment structure. Nonetheless, there is often a preferred order; in Latin and Turkish, SOV is the most frequent outside of poetry, and in Finnish SVO is both the most frequent and obligatory when case marking fails to disambiguate argument roles. Just as languages may have different word orders in different contexts, so may they have both fixed and free word orders. For example, Russian has a relatively fixed SVO (Subject-Verb-Object) word order in transitive clauses, but a much freer SV / VS order in intransitive clauses. Cases like this can be addressed by encoding transitive and intransitive clauses separately, with the symbol "S" being restricted to the argument of an intransitive clause, and "A" for the actor/agent of a transitive clause. ("O" for object may be replaced with "P" for "patient" as well.) Thus, Russian is fixed AVO (Agent-Verb-Object) but flexible SV/VS. In such an approach, the description of word order extends more easily to languages that do not meet the criteria in the preceding section. For example, Mayan languages have been described with the rather uncommon VOS word order. However, they are ergative–absolutive languages, and the more specific word order is intransitive VS, transitive VOA (Verb-Object-Absolutive), where the S and O arguments both trigger the same type of agreement on the verb. Indeed, many languages that some thought had a VOS (Verb-Object-Subject) word order turn out to be ergative like Mayan.

== Distribution of word order types ==
Every language falls under one of the six word order types; the unfixed type is somewhat disputed in the community, as the languages where it occurs have one of the dominant word orders but every word order type is grammatically correct.

The table below displays the word order surveyed by Dryer. The 2005 study surveyed 1228 languages, and the updated 2013 study investigated 1377 languages. Percentage was not reported in his studies.

Word Order	Number (2005)	Percentage (2005)	Number (2013)	Percentage (2013)
SOV	497	40.5%	565	41.0%
SVO	435	35.4%	488	35.4%
VSO	85	6.9%	95	6.9%
VOS	26	2.1%	25	1.8%
OVS	9	0.7%	11	0.8%
OSV	4	0.3%	4	0.3%
Unfixed	172	14.0%	189	13.7%

Hammarström (2016) calculated the constituent orders of 5252 languages in two ways. His first method, counting languages directly, yielded results similar to Dryer's studies, indicating both SOV and SVO have almost equal distribution. However, when stratified by language families, the distribution showed that the majority of the families had SOV structure, meaning that a small number of families contain SVO structure.

Word Order	No. of Languages	Percentage	No. of Families	Percentage (Note: Hammarström included families with no data in his count (58 out of 424 = 13.7%), but did not include them in the list. This is why the percentages do not add up to 100% in this column.)
SOV	2275	43.3%	239	56.6%
SVO	2117	40.3%	55	13.0%
VSO	503	9.5%	27	6.3%
VOS	174	3.3%	15	3.5%
OVS	40	0.7%	3	0.7%
OSV	19	0.3%	1	0.2%
Unfixed	124	2.3%	26	6.1%

== Functions of constituent word order ==
Fixed word order is one out of many ways to ease the processing of sentence semantics and reducing ambiguity. One method of making the speech stream less open to ambiguity (complete removal of ambiguity is probably impossible) is a fixed order of arguments and other sentence constituents. This works because speech is inherently linear. Another method is to label the constituents in some way, for example with case marking, agreement, or another marker. Fixed word order reduces expressiveness but added marking increases information load in the speech stream, and for these reasons strict word order seldom occurs together with strict morphological marking, one counter-example being Persian.

Observing discourse patterns, it is found that previously given information (topic) tends to precede new information (comment). Furthermore, acting participants (especially humans) are more likely to be talked about (to be topic) than things simply undergoing actions (like oranges being eaten). If acting participants are often topical, and topic tends to be expressed early in the sentence, this entails that acting participants have a tendency to be expressed early in the sentence. This tendency can then grammaticalize to a privileged position in the sentence, the subject.

The mentioned functions of word order can be seen to affect the frequencies of the various word order patterns: The vast majority of languages have an order in which S precedes O and V. Whether V precedes O or O precedes V, however, has been shown to be a very telling difference with wide consequences on phrasal word orders.

== Semantics of word order ==
In many languages, standard word order can be subverted in order to form questions or as a means of emphasis. In languages such as O'odham and Hungarian, which are discussed below, almost all possible permutations of a sentence are grammatical, but not all of them are used. In languages such as English and German, word order is used as a means of turning declarative into interrogative sentences:

A: 'Wen liebt Kate?' / 'Kate liebt wen?' [Whom does Kate love? / Kate loves whom?] (OVS/SVO)

B: 'Sie liebt Mark' / 'Mark ist der, den sie liebt' [She loves Mark / It is Mark whom she loves.] (SVO/OSV)

C: 'Liebt Kate Mark?' [Does Kate love Mark?] (VSO)

In (A), the first sentence shows the word order used for wh-questions in English and German. The second sentence is an echo question; it would be uttered only after receiving an unsatisfactory or confusing answer to a question. One could replace the word wen [whom] (which indicates that this sentence is a question) with an identifier such as Mark: 'Kate liebt Mark?' [Kate loves Mark?]. In that case, since no change in word order occurs, it is only by means of stress and tone that we are able to identify the sentence as a question.

In (B), the first sentence is declarative and provides an answer to the first question in (A). The second sentence emphasizes that Kate does indeed love Mark, and not whomever else we might have assumed her to love. However, a sentence this verbose is unlikely to occur in everyday speech (or even in written language), be it in English or in German. Instead, one would most likely answer the echo question in (A) simply by restating: Mark!. This is the same for both languages.

In yes–no questions such as (C), English and German use subject-verb inversion. But, whereas English relies on do-support to form questions from verbs other than auxiliaries, German has no such restriction and uses inversion to form questions, even from lexical verbs.

Despite this, English, as opposed to German, has very strict word order. In German, word order can be used as a means to emphasize a constituent in an independent clause by moving it to the beginning of the sentence. This is a defining characteristic of German as a V2 (verb-second) language, where, in independent clauses, the finite verb always comes second and is preceded by one and only one constituent. In closed questions, V1 (verb-first) word order is used. And lastly, dependent clauses use verb-final word order. However, German cannot be called an SVO language since no actual constraints are imposed on the placement of the subject and object(s), even though a preference for a certain word-order over others can be observed (such as putting the subject after the finite verb in independent clauses unless it already precedes the verb).

== Phrase word orders and branching ==
The order of constituents in a phrase can vary as much as the order of constituents in a clause. Normally, the noun phrase and the adpositional phrase are investigated. Within the noun phrase, one investigates whether the following modifiers occur before and/or after the head noun.

- adjective (red house vs house red)
- determiner (this house vs house this)
- numeral (two houses vs houses two)
- possessor (my house vs house my)
- relative clause (by me built the house vs the house built by me)

Within the adpositional clause, one investigates whether the languages makes use of prepositions (in London), postpositions (London in), or both (normally with different adpositions at both sides) either separately (For whom? or Whom for?) or at the same time (from her away; Dutch example: met hem mee meaning together with him).

There are several common correlations between sentence-level word order and phrase-level constituent order. For example, SOV languages generally put modifiers before heads and use postpositions (some, such a modern Persian, are unusual, being SOV but using prepositions and placing adjectives after nouns). VSO languages tend to place modifiers after their heads, and use prepositions. For SVO languages, either order is common (for example, Swahili, English, Romance languages use prepositions, Finnish on the other hand uses postpositions).

For example, French (SVO) uses prepositions (dans la voiture, à gauche), and places most adjectives after (une voiture spacieuse). However, a small class of adjectives generally go before their heads (une grande voiture), or both, depending on the context. On the other hand, in English (also SVO) adjectives almost always go before nouns (a big car), and adverbs can go either way, but initially is more common (greatly improved). (English has a very small number of adjectives that go after the heads, such as extraordinaire, which kept its position when borrowed from French.) Russian places numerals after nouns to express approximation (шесть домов=six houses, домов шесть=circa six houses).

== Pragmatic word order ==
Some languages do not have a fixed word order and often use a significant amount of morphological marking to disambiguate the roles of the arguments. However, the degree of marking alone does not indicate whether a language uses a fixed or free word order: some languages may use a fixed order even when they provide a high degree of marking, while others (such as some varieties of Datooga) may combine a free order with a lack of morphological distinction between arguments.

Typologically, there is a trend that high-animacy actors are more likely to be topical than low-animacy undergoers; this trend can come through even in languages with free word order, giving a statistical bias for SO order (or OS order in ergative systems; however, ergative systems do not always extend to the highest levels of animacy, sometimes giving way to an accusative system (see split ergativity).

Most languages with a high degree of morphological marking have rather flexible word orders, such as Polish, Hungarian, Spanish, Latin, Albanian, and O'odham. In some languages, a general word order can be identified, but this is much harder in others. When the word order is free, different choices of word order can be used to help identify the theme and the rheme.

=== Hungarian ===
Word order in Hungarian sentences can change according to the speaker's communicative intentions. Hungarian word order is not free in the sense that it must reflect the information structure of the sentence, distinguishing the emphatic part that carries new information (rheme) from the rest of the sentence that carries little or no new information (theme).

The position of focus in a Hungarian sentence is immediately before the verb, that is, nothing can separate the emphatic part of the sentence from the verb.

For "Kate ate a piece of cake", the possibilities are:

1. "Kati megevett egy szelet tortát." (same word order as English) ["Kate ate a piece of cake."]
2. "Egy szelet tortát Kati evett meg." (emphasis on agent [Kate]) ["A piece of cake Kate ate."] (One of the pieces of cake was eaten by Kate.)
3. "Kati evett meg egy szelet tortát." (also emphasis on agent [Kate]) ["Kate ate a piece of cake."] (Kate was the one eating one piece of cake.)
4. "Kati egy szelet tortát evett meg." (emphasis on object [cake]) ["Kate a piece of cake ate."] (Kate ate a piece of cake – cf. not a piece of bread.)
5. "Egy szelet tortát evett meg Kati." (emphasis on number [a piece, i.e. only one piece]) ["A piece of cake ate Kate."] (Only one piece of cake was eaten by Kate.)
6. "Megevett egy szelet tortát Kati." (emphasis on completeness of action) ["Ate a piece of cake Kate."] (A piece of cake had been finished by Kate.)
7. "Megevett Kati egy szelet tortát." (emphasis on completeness of action) ["Ate Kate a piece of cake."] (Kate finished with a piece of cake.)

The only freedom in Hungarian word order is that the order of parts outside the focus position and the verb may be freely changed without any change to the communicative focus of the sentence, as seen in sentences 2 and 3 as well as in sentences 6 and 7 above. These pairs of sentences have the same information structure, expressing the same communicative intention of the speaker, because the part immediately preceding the verb is left unchanged.

The emphasis can be on the action (verb) itself, as seen in sentences 1, 6 and 7, or it can be on parts other than the action (verb), as seen in sentences 2, 3, 4 and 5. If the emphasis is not on the verb, and the verb has a co-verb (in the above example 'meg'), then the co-verb is separated from the verb, and always follows the verb. Also the enclitic -t marks the direct object: 'torta' (cake) + '-t' -> 'tortát'.

=== Hindi-Urdu ===
Hindi-Urdu (Hindustani) is essentially a verb-final (SOV) language, with relatively free word order since in most cases postpositions explicitly mark the relationships of noun phrases to the other sentence constituents. Word order in Hindustani does not usually encode grammatical functions. Constituents can be scrambled to express different information structural configurations, or for stylistic reasons. The first syntactic constituent in a sentence is usually the topic, which may under certain conditions be marked by the particle "to" (तो / تو), similar in some respects to Japanese topic marker は (wa). Some rules governing the position of words in a sentence are as follows:

- An adjective comes before the noun it modifies in its unmarked position. However, the possessive and reflexive pronominal adjectives can occur either to the left or to the right of the noun it describes.
- Negation must come either to the left or to the right of the verb it negates. For compound verbs or verbal construction using auxiliaries the negation can occur either to the left of the first verb, in-between the verbs or to the right of the second verb (the default position being to the left of the main verb when used with auxiliary and in-between the primary and the secondary verb when forming a compound verb).
- Adverbs usually precede the adjectives they qualify in their unmarked position, but when adverbs are constructed using the instrumental case postposition se (से /سے) (which qualifies verbs), their position in the sentence becomes free. However, since both the instrumental and the ablative case are marked by the same postposition "se" (से /سے), when both are present in a sentence then the quantity they modify cannot appear adjacent to each other.
- "kyā " (क्या / کیا) "what" as the yes–no question marker occurs at the beginning or the end of a clause as its unmarked positions but it can be put anywhere in the sentence except the preverbal position, where instead it is interpreted as interrogative "what".

Some of all the possible word order permutations of the sentence "The girl received a gift from the boy on her birthday." are shown below.

- lar̥ki ko lar̥ke se janmdin pe taufā milā
- lar̥ke se lar̥ki ko janmdin pe taufā milā
- janmdin pe lar̥ki ko milā lar̥ke se taufā
- taufā lar̥ke se lar̥ki ko janmdin pe milā
- milā janmdin pe lar̥ki ko taufā lar̥ke se
- lar̥ki ko taufā lar̥ke se janmdin pe milā
- lar̥ke se taufā lar̥ki ko janmdin pe milā
- janmdin pe lar̥ke se taufā lar̥ki ko milā
- taufā lar̥ke se janmdin pe milā lar̥ki ko
- milā lar̥ki ko janmdin pe taufā lar̥ke se
- taufā lar̥ki ko lar̥ke se janmdin pe milā
- taufā lar̥ke se lar̥ki ko milā janmdin pe
- janmdin pe milā lar̥ke se taufā lar̥ki ko
- lar̥ke se janmdin pe milā taufā lar̥ki ko
- milā taufā lar̥ki ko janmdin pe lar̥ke se
- lar̥ke se milā lar̥ki ko taufā janmdin pe
- lar̥ke se milā taufā lar̥ki ko janmdin pe
- taufā lar̥ke se milā lar̥ki ko janmdin pe
- taufā milā lar̥ke se janmdin pe lar̥ki ko
- milā lar̥ki ko lar̥ke se janmdin pe taufā
- lar̥ke se taufā lar̥ki ko janmdin pe milā
- lar̥ke se janmdin pe lar̥ki ko milā taufā
- taufā janmdin pe lar̥ke se milā lar̥ki ko
- lar̥ki ko janmdin pe taufā milā lar̥ke se
- milā lar̥ke se lar̥ki ko janmdin pe taufā

=== Portuguese ===
In Portuguese, clitic pronouns and commas allow many different orders:

- "Eu vou entregar a você amanhã." ["I will deliver to you tomorrow."] (same word order as English)
- "Entregarei a você amanhã." ["{I} will deliver to you tomorrow."]
- "Eu lhe entregarei amanhã." ["I to you will deliver tomorrow."]
- "Entregar-lhe-ei amanhã." ["Deliver to you {I} will tomorrow."] (mesoclisis)
- "A ti, eu entregarei amanhã." ["To you I will deliver tomorrow."]
- "A ti, entregarei amanhã." ["To you {I} deliver will tomorrow."]
- "Amanhã, entregar-te-ei" ["Tomorrow {I} will deliver to you"]
- "Poderia entregar, eu, a você amanhã?" ["Could deliver I to you tomorrow?]

Braces ({ }) are used above to indicate omitted subject pronouns, which may be implicit in Portuguese. Because of conjugation, the grammatical person is recovered.

=== Latin ===
In Classical Latin, the endings of nouns, verbs, adjectives, and pronouns allow for extremely flexible order in most situations. Latin lacks articles.

The subject, verb, and object can come in any order in a Latin sentence, although most often (especially in subordinate clauses) the verb comes last. Pragmatic factors, such as topic and focus, play a large part in determining the order. Thus the following sentences each answer a different question:

- "Romulus Romam condidit." ["Romulus founded Rome"] (What did Romulus do?)
- "Hanc urbem condidit Romulus." ["Romulus founded this city"] (Who founded this city?)
- "Condidit Romam Romulus." ["Romulus founded Rome"] (What happened?)

Latin prose often follows the word order "Subject, Direct Object, Indirect Object, Adverb, Verb", but this is more of a guideline than a rule. Adjectives in most cases go before the noun they modify, but some categories, such as those that determine or specify (e.g. Via Appia "Appian Way"), usually follow the noun. In Classical Latin poetry, lyricists followed word order very loosely to achieve a desired scansion.

=== Albanian ===
Due to the presence of grammatical cases (nominative, genitive, dative, accusative, ablative, and in some cases or dialects vocative and locative) applied to nouns, pronouns and adjectives, Albanian permits a large variety of word order combinations. In the spoken language, an alternative word order to the most common S-V-O helps the speaker to emphasise a word and hence make a nuanced change to the meaning. For example:

- "Marku më dha një dhuratë (mua)." ["Mark (me) gave a present to me."] (neutral narrating sentence.)
- "Marku (mua) më dha një dhuratë." ["Mark to me (me) gave a present."] (emphasis on the indirect object, probably to compare the result of the verb on different persons.)
- "Marku një dhuratë më dha (mua)." ["Mark a present (me) gave to me"] (meaning that Mark gave her only a present, and not something else or more presents.)
- "Marku një dhuratë (mua) më dha." ["Mark a present to me (me) gave"] (meaning that Mark gave a present only to her.)
- "Më dha Marku një dhuratë (mua)." ["Gave Mark to me a present."] (neutral sentence, but puts less emphasis on the subject.)
- "Më dha një dhuratë Marku (mua)." ["Gave a present to me Mark."] (probably is the cause of an event being introduced later.)
- "Më dha (mua) Marku një dhurate." ["Gave to me Mark a present."] (same as above.)
- "Më dha një dhuratë mua Marku" ["(Me) gave a present to me Mark."] (puts emphasis on the fact that the receiver is her and not someone else.)
- "Një dhuratë më dha Marku (mua)" ["A present gave Mark to me."] (meaning it was a present and not something else.)
- "Një dhuratë Marku më dha (mua)" ["A present Mark gave to me."] (puts emphasis on the fact that she got the present and someone else got something different.)
- "Një dhuratë (mua) më dha Marku." ["A present to me gave Mark."] (no particular emphasis, but can be used to list different actions from different subjects.)
- "Një dhuratë (mua) Marku më dha." ["A present to me Mark (me) gave"] (remembers that at least a present was given to her by Mark.)
- "Mua më dha Marku një dhuratë." ["To me (me) gave Mark a present." (is used when Mark gave something else to others.)
- "Mua një dhuratë më dha Marku." ["To me a present (me) gave Mark."] (emphasis on "to me" and the fact that it was a present, only one present or it was something different from usual.)
- "Mua Marku një dhuratë më dha" ["To me Mark a present (me) gave."] (Mark gave her only one present.)
- "Mua Marku më dha një dhuratë" ["To me Mark (me) gave a present."] (puts emphasis on Mark. Probably the others did not give her present, they gave something else or the present was not expected at all.)

In these examples, "(mua)" can be omitted when not in first position, causing a perceivable change in emphasis; the latter being of different intensity. "Më" is always followed by the verb. Thus, a sentence consisting of a subject, a verb and two objects (a direct and an indirect one), can be expressed in six ways without "mua", and in twenty-four ways with "mua", adding up to thirty possible combinations.

=== O'odham (Papago-Pima) ===
O'odham is a language that is spoken in southern Arizona and Northern Sonora, Mexico. It has free word order, with only the auxiliary bound to one spot. Here is an example in literal translation:

- "Wakial 'o g wipsilo ha-cecposid." [Cowboy is the calves them branding.] (The cowboy is branding the calves.)
- "Wipsilo 'o ha-cecposid g wakial." [Calves is them branding the cowboy.]
- "Ha-cecposid 'o g wakial g wipsilo." [Them branding is the cowboy the calves.]
- "Wipsilo 'o g wakial ha-cecposid." [Calves is the cowboy them branding.]
- "Ha-cecposid 'o g wipsilo g wakial." [Them branding is the calves the cowboy.]
- "Wakial 'o ha-cecposid g wipsilo." [Cowboy is them branding the calves.]

Those examples are all grammatically valid variations on the sentence "The cowboy is branding the calves," but some are rarely found in natural speech, as is discussed in Grammaticality.

== Other issues with word order ==
=== Language change ===
Languages change over time. When language change involves a shift in a language's syntax, this is called syntactic change. An example of this is found in Old English, which at one point had flexible word order, before losing it over the course of its evolution. In Old English, both of the following sentences would be considered grammatically correct:

- "Martianus hæfde his sunu ær befæst" [Martianus had his son earlier established] (Martianus had earlier established his son.)
- "gif heo þæt bysmor forberan wolde" [if she that disgrace tolerate would] (if she would tolerate that disgrace.)

This flexibility continues into early Middle English, where it seems to drop out of usage. Shakespeare's plays use OV word order frequently, as can be seen from this example:

- "It was our selfe thou didst abuse."

A modern speaker of English would possibly recognise this as a grammatically comprehensible sentence, but nonetheless archaic. There are some verbs, however, that are entirely acceptable in this format:

- "Are they good?"

This is acceptable to a modern English speaker and is not considered archaic. This is due to the verb "to be", which acts as both auxiliary and main verb. Similarly, other auxiliary and modal verbs allow for VSO word order ("Must he perish?"). Non-auxiliary and non-modal verbs require insertion of an auxiliary to conform to modern usage ("Did he buy the book?"). Shakespeare's usage of word order is not indicative of English at the time, which had dropped OV order at least a century before.

This variation between archaic and modern can also be shown in the change between VSO to SVO in Coptic, the language of the Christian Church in Egypt.

=== Dialectal variation ===
There are some languages which have different preferred word orders in different dialects. One such case is Andean Spanish, spoken in Peru. While Spanish is classified as an SVO language, Peruvian Spanish has been influenced by Quechua and Aymara, both SOV languages. This has led to some first-language (L1) Spanish speakers using SOV word order in more sentences than would be expected. L2 speakers in Peru also use SOV word order.

=== Poetry ===
Poetry and stories can use different word orders to emphasize certain aspects of the sentence. In English, this is called anastrophe. Here is an example:

"Kate loves Mark."

"Mark Kate loves."

Here SVO is changed to OSV to emphasize the object.

=== Translation ===
Differences in word order complicate translation and language education – in addition to changing individual words, the order must be changed. The area of linguistics that is concerned with translation and education is language acquisition. The reordering of words can cause problems when transcribing stories. Rhyme schemes can change, as well as the meaning behind the words. This can be especially problematic when translating poetry.

== See also ==
- Antisymmetry – Syntactic theory in linguistics
- Information flow – Tracking of referential information by speakers
- Language change – Modification or development of a language
