= Topic Continuity in Discourse =

- Author: Talmy Givón
- Language: English
- Series: Typological Studies in Language
- Subject: pragmatics
- Genre: nonfiction
- Publisher: John Benjamins
- Publication date: 1983
- Pages: 492
- ISBN: 90-272-2867-1
- OCLC: 10313658
- LC Class: P302 .T66x 1983

Topic Continuity in Discourse—subtitled A Quantitative Cross Language Study—is a book edited by Talmy Givón, with contributions by himself and other experts in various languages. It is part of the series Typological Studies in Language (a supplement series to the academic journal Studies in Language) and was published by John Benjamins in 1983.

The book presents a cross-linguistic hierarchy of natural language "syntactic coding of topic accessibility" (including, for example, discourse participant prominence). Givón describes the aim of the research, documented in the book, as "the rather ambitious goal ... to define, in a preliminary but cross-linguistically stable fashion, the basic principles of iconicity underlying the syntactic coding of the topic identification domain."

Givón's starting point was his previously published (1978, 1979, 1981 and 1982) one-dimensional scale. As listed by him, from "most continuous/accessible topic" to "most discontinuous/inaccessible topic" this was as follows:

- zero anaphora
- unstressed-bound pronouns and grammatical agreement
- stressed-independent pronouns
- right-dislocated definite noun phrases (NP)
- neutral-ordered NPs
- left-dislocated NPs
- Y-moved NPs (or "contrastive topicalization")
- cleft and focus constructions
- referential indefinite NPs

The language specific studies provided in the book are on Japanese, Amharic, Ute, Biblical Hebrew, Latin-American Spanish, written English, spoken English, Hausa and Chamorro. The data from these languages were analysed according to a common methodology, explained by Givón in the introduction to the book, and agreed upon by all the other contributors. The methodology involved quantitative measurements, which although statistical, were designed to be repeatable and applicable to any language.

== See also ==
- Cognitive science
- Context
- Human universals
- Language universals
- Pragmatics
- Psycholinguistics
- Sociolinguistics
- Universal grammar

== Bibliography ==
- Givón, Talmy. Topic Continuity in Discourse: A Quantitative Cross Language Study. Typological Studies in Language 3. Amsterdam: John Benjamins, 1983.
