= Grintovec, Ivančna Gorica =

Grintovec
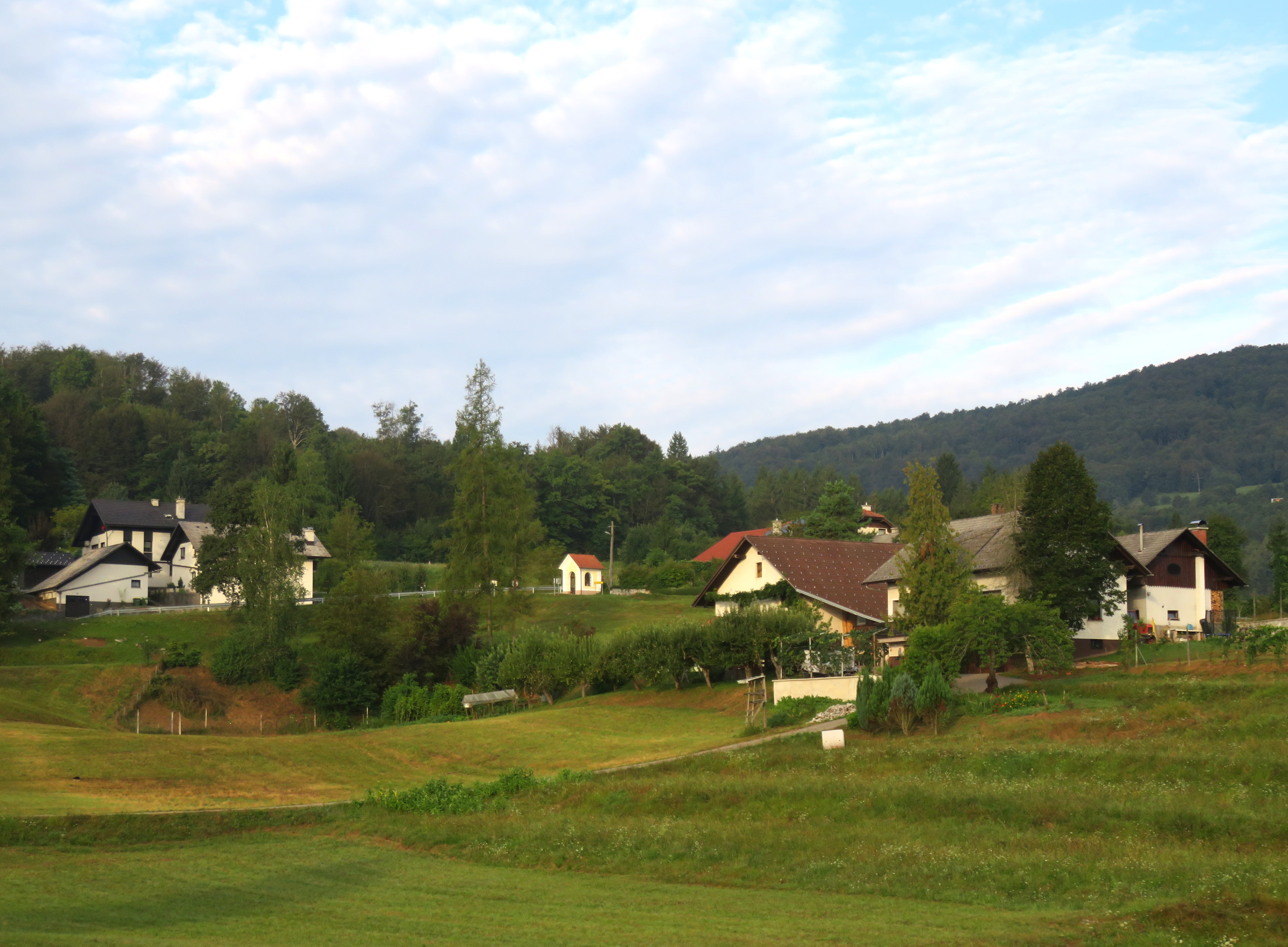

- Location in Slovenia
- Coordinates: 45°51′19.31″N 14°49′41.08″E
- Country: Slovenia
- Traditional region: Lower Carniola
- Statistical region: Central Slovenia
- Municipality: Ivančna Gorica

Area
  - Total: 0.87 km^{2} (0.34 sq mi)
- Elevation: 289.1 m (948 ft)

Population (2002)
  - Total: 81

Grintovec (pronounced [ˈɡɾiːntɔʋəts]) is a settlement on the right bank of the Krka River in the Municipality of Ivančna Gorica in central Slovenia. It is part of the historical region of Lower Carniola, and the municipality is now included in the Central Slovenia Statistical Region.

A small roadside chapel-shrine dedicated to the Virgin Mary is located in the settlement, and was built in the 19th century.

== Andrejka Mill ==
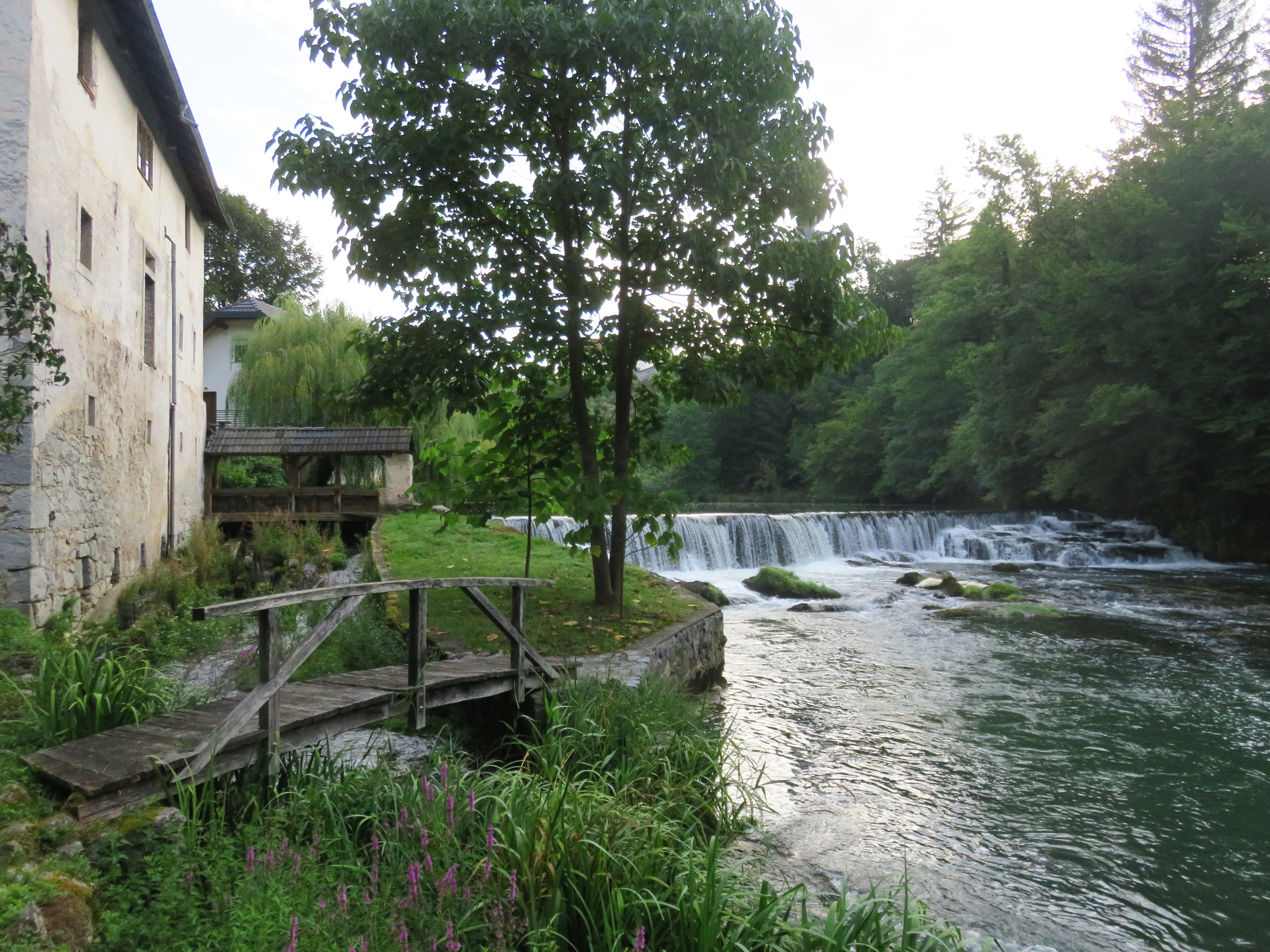
The Andrejka Mill on the Krka River

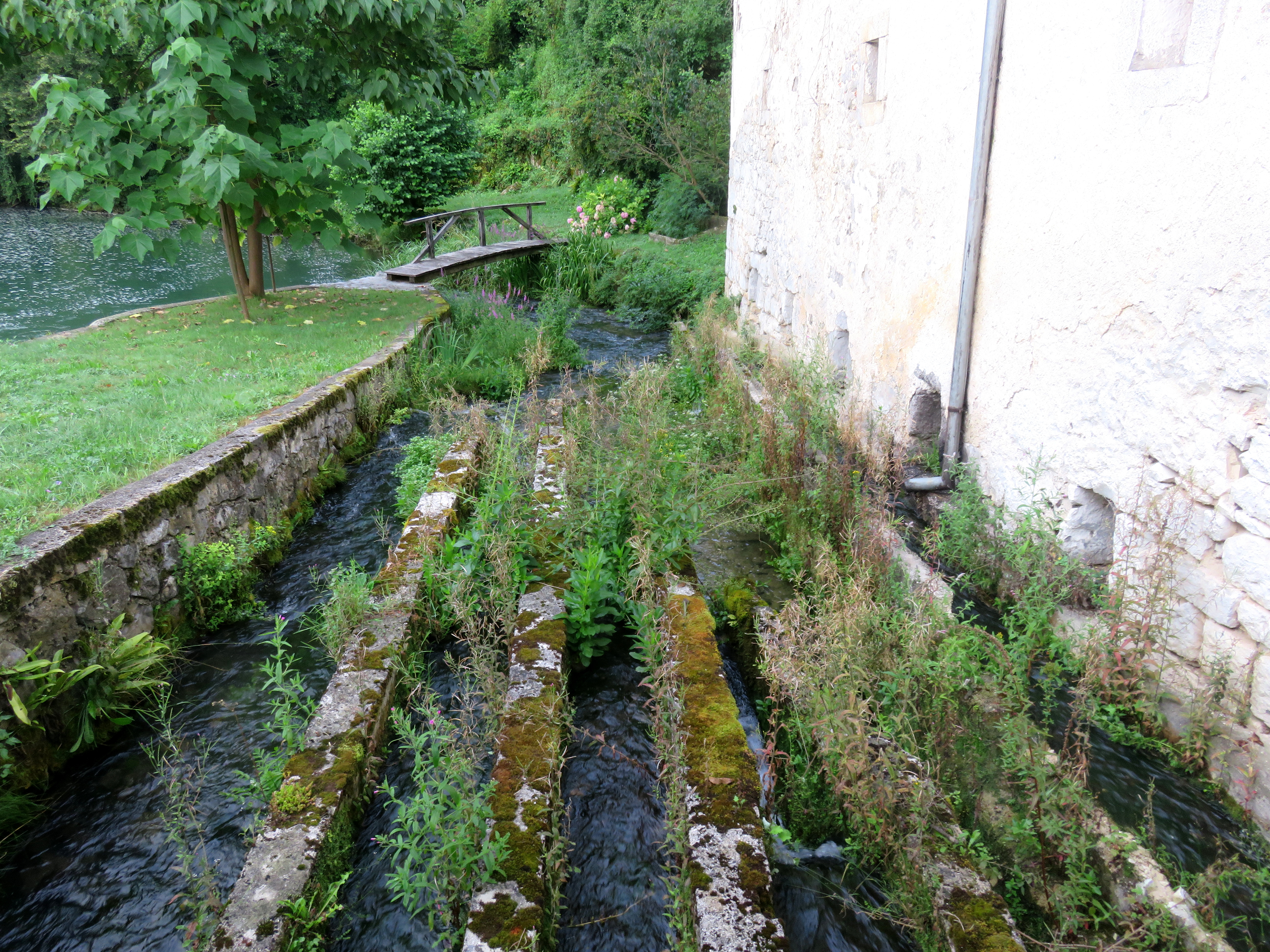
Six troughs fed by the millstream

The Andrejka Mill (Slovene: Andrejkatov mlin), also known as the Mevec Mill (Slovene: Mevčev mlin), stands on the Krka River in the northeastern part of the settlement. It dates to the second half of the 18th century. The millstream feeds six troughs that powered separate wheels. The mill operated until 1966.
