= Univerbation =

Method of word formation

In linguistics, univerbation is the diachronic process of combining a fixed expression of several words into a new single word.

The univerbating process is epitomized in Talmy Givón's aphorism that "today's morphology is yesterday's syntax".

== Examples ==
Some univerbated examples are always (from all [the] way; the s was added later), onto (from on to), albeit (from all be it), and colloquial gonna (from going to) and finna (from fixin' to).

Although a univerbated product is normally written as a single word, occasionally it remains orthographically disconnected. For example, bon marché (French, lit. 'good deal') acts like a single adjectival word that means 'cheap', the opposite of which is cher ('costly') as opposed to [un] mauvais marché ('a bad deal').

== Similar phenomena ==
It may be contrasted with compounding (composition). Because compound words do not always originate from fixed phrases that already exist, compounding may be termed a "coercive" or "forced" process. Univerbation, on the other hand, is considered a "spontaneous" process.

It differs from agglutination in that agglutination is not limited to the word level.

Crasis (merging of adjacent vowels) is one way in which words are univerbated in some languages.

== See also ==
- Grammaticalization
- Rebracketing
