= Thomas Givon =

American linguist (born 1936)

- Born: 22 June 1936; Afula, British Mandate of Palestine (now Israel)
- Died: 20 September 2026
- Occupation: Linguist

Thomas Givon (22 June, 1936 – 24 September, 2026), also known as Talmy Givón, was an American linguist and writer. He was one of the founders of "West Coast Functionalism", today classified as a usage-based model of language, and of the linguistics department at the University of Oregon. Givón advocated an evolutionary approach to language and communication.

== Education ==
Givón earned his bachelor of science degree cum laude in agriculture from the Hebrew University of Jerusalem in 1959. Attending UCLA, he received a Master of Science degree in horticulture in 1962, a C.Phil in Plant Biochemistry, a Master of Arts degree in linguistics in 1966, and a PhD in linguistics in 1969, as well as a TESL certificate in 1965.

== Career ==
In 1966 Givón worked for System Development Corporation as a research associate in lexicography. The following year he went to University of Zambia where he researched Bantu languages. In 1969 he became an assistant professor of Linguistics and African Languages at University of California at Los Angeles. He was promoted to associate professor there in 1974 and full professor in 1979. In 1981 he moved to University of Oregon as professor of linguistics until 2002 when he became Distinguished Professor (emeritus) of Linguistics and Cognitive Science. Givón's last general linguistic project was The Genesis of Complex Syntax: Diachrony, Ontogeny, Cognition, Evolution.

=== Work in linguistics ===
His work covers many language areas (Semitic, African, Amerindian, Austronesian, Papuan, Sino-Tibetan, Indo-European), as well as many areas of theoretical linguistics: syntax, semantics, pragmatics, second language acquisition, pidgins and creoles, discourse and text linguistics, methodology and philosophy of science, philosophy of language, typology and language universals, grammaticalization and historical syntax, cognitive science, language evolution.

Givón is said to have coined the aphorism that "today's morphology is yesterday's syntax", in a development of Antoine Meillet's work on grammaticalisation.

He was the editor of the book series Typological Studies in Language published by John Benjamins Publishing Company.

Thomas Givon died in 2026 at the age of 90.

== Other writings ==
Givon wrote a series of novels and historical translations through his publishing house, White Cloud Publishing, and had a personal blog.

== Bibliography ==
Givón's published books include:

- The Travels of Benjamins Adam, (a novel; 1966)
- The Si-Luyana Language: A Preliminary Linguistic Description, (1970)
- Studies in Chi-Bemba and Bantu Grammar, (1973)
- On Understanding Grammar, (1979) review in American Scientist vol 68, Sep–Oct 1980
- Ute Dictionary, (1979)
- Ute Reference Grammar, (1980)
- Topic Continuity in Discourse, (1983; editor)
- Syntax: A Functional-Typological Introduction, (vol. I, 1984; vol. II 1990; revised edition published in 2001 as Syntax: An Introduction)
- Ute Traditional Narratives, (1985)
- Mind, Code, and Context: Essays in Pragmatics, (1989)
- English Grammar, (2 vols; 1993)
- Functionalism and Grammar, (1995) review in doi:10.1515/thli.1996.22.1-2.125
- Running Through the Tall Grass, (a novel; 1997) review in Publishers Weekly
- Syntax: An Introduction, (2 vols, 2001) review in JSTOR 4176888
- Bio-Linguistics, (2002) reviewed in doi:10.1353/lan.2005.0030 and
- Context as Other Minds, (2005) review in and doi:10.1353/lan.0.0046
- The Genesis of Syntactic Complexity, (2009) review in doi:10.1353/lan.0.0157
- Ute Reference Grammar, (2011)
- "Seadock: The Boz Trilogy #1", (a novel; 2011)
- "Sasquatch: The Boz Trilogy #2", (a novel; 2011)
- "Blood: The Boz Trilogy #3", (a novel; 2012)
- "Tao Teh Ching", (a historical translation; 2012)
