= Functional item =

In the framework of Noam Chomsky's Minimalist Program, items of the lexicon are of two types: with or without substantive content. Items of the former category are called lexical items, whereas items of the latter category are functional items. Functional items carry the grammatical content of a sentence, which means that by taking them out of the sentence one would still understand the meaning, although it would not be grammatical. In other words, they are the 'glue' that holds the sentence together. Functional items can also be classified as closed class, that is, belonging to parts of speech that do not easily allow new members. If functional items are removed from a sentence, the words that would be left are the lexical items. The lexical items of a sentence are those that are used in telegraphic speech; functional items are the grammatical units that hold the sentence together and make it more fluid. Functional Items are feature sets. Functional items include two type of morphemes. Free morphemes, like modals, auxiliaries, determiners, complementizers and bound morphemes such as nominal and verbal affixes. Though functional items have feature structure, they do not enter into θ-marking.

The following table provides examples of commonly used functional items:

Functional (Closed) Categories of English	Examples
Preposition	to, from, under, over, with, by, at, above, before, after, through, near, on, off, for, in, into, of, during, across, without, since, until
Determiner	the, a, an, this, that, these, those, yon, every, some, many, most, few, all, each, any, less, fewer, no, one, two, three, four, etc., my, your, his, her, its, our, their
Conjunction	and, or, nor, neither, either
Complementizers	that, for, if, whether
TAM	-ed, have, has, had, am, is, are, was, were, do, does, did, will, would, shall, should, can, could, may, might, must
Agreement	-s
Negation	not

== Infants' Acquisition of Functional Items ==
Infants start identifying functional items in the second semester after birth. They are able to recognize functional items by hearing them frequently and also through phonological and distributional cues. Moreover, infants are able to distinguish between functional and lexical items based on phonological and acoustic cues. Children's first word combinations are limited in the range of relational meanings. According to some views of language acquisition, cognitive development provides the categories of early combinational speech, and input from the child's speech provides lexical items that fill those categories. Functional items commonly included English children's early acquisition include early stage words such as "in, on, a, the, 'm, 's, 're (contractible copulas) and possessive 's.

Children with specific language impairments have difficulties with a range of elements within functional categories. Compared to younger, normally developing children with equal mean utterance lengths, impaired children do not use grammatical elements associated with the categories as much. However, there is no evidence that they lack whole functional categories altogether; even children with very limited speech are shown to use two or more different elements within each functional category system.
