= Language change =

Modification or development of a language

Language change is the process of alteration in the features of a single language, or of languages in general, over time. It is studied in several subfields of linguistics: historical linguistics, sociolinguistics, and evolutionary linguistics. Traditional theories of historical linguistics identify three main types of change: systematic change in the pronunciation of phonemes, or sound change; borrowing, in which new features (often, new words) enter a language or dialect as a result of influence from another language or dialect; and analogical change, in which the shape or grammatical behaviour of a word is altered to more closely resemble that of another word. Research on language change generally assumes the uniformitarian principle—the presumption that language changes in the past took place according to the same general principles as language changes visible in the present.

Language change usually does not occur suddenly, but rather takes place via an extended period of variation, during which new and old linguistic features coexist. All living languages are continually undergoing change. Some commentators use derogatory labels such as "corruption" to suggest that language change constitutes a degradation in the quality of a language, especially when the change originates from human error or is a prescriptively discouraged usage. Modern linguistics rejects this concept, since from a scientific point of view such innovations cannot be judged in terms of good or bad. John Lyons notes that "any standard of evaluation applied to language-change must be based upon a recognition of the various functions a language 'is called upon' to fulfil in the society which uses it".

Over enough time, changes in a language can accumulate to such an extent that it is no longer recognizable as the same language. For instance, modern English is the result of centuries of language change applying to Old English, even though modern English is extremely divergent from Old English in grammar, vocabulary, and pronunciation. The two may be thought of as distinct languages, but Modern English is a "descendant" of its "ancestor" Old English. When multiple languages are all descended from the same ancestor language, as the Romance languages are from Vulgar Latin, they are said to form a language family and be "genetically" related.

== Causes ==
- Economy: Speech communities tend to change their utterances to be as efficient and effective (with as little effort) as possible, while still reaching communicative goals. Purposeful speaking therefore involves a trade-off of costs and benefits.
  - The principle of least effort tends to result in phonetic reduction of speech forms. See vowel reduction, cluster reduction, lenition, and elision. After some time, a change may become widely accepted (it becomes a regular sound change) and may end up treated as standard. For instance: going to [ˈɡoʊ.ɪŋ.tʊ] → gonna [ˈɡɔnə] or [ˈɡʌnə], with examples of both vowel reduction [ʊ] → [ə] and elision [nt] → [n], [oʊ.ɪ] → [ʌ].
- Expressiveness: Common or overused language tends to lose its emotional or rhetorical intensity over time; therefore, new words and constructions are continuously employed to revive that intensity.
- Analogy: Over time, speech communities unconsciously apply patterns of rules in certain words, sounds, etc., to unrelated other words, sounds, etc.
- Language contact: Words and constructions are borrowed from one language into another.
- Cultural environment: As a culture evolves, new places, situations, and objects inevitably enter its language, whether or not the culture encounters different people.
- Migration/Movement: Speech communities, moving into a region with a new or more complex linguistic situation, will influence, and be influenced by, language change; they sometimes even end up with entirely new languages, such as pidgins and creoles.
- Imperfect learning: According to one view, children regularly learn the adult forms imperfectly, and the changed forms then turn into a new standard. Alternatively, imperfect learning occurs regularly in one part of society, such as an immigrant group, where the minority language forms a substratum, and the changed forms can ultimately influence majority usage.
- Social prestige: A language change towards adopting features that have more social prestige, or away from ones with negative prestige, as in the case of the loss of rhoticity in the British Received Pronunciation accent. Such movements can go back and forth.

According to Guy Deutscher, the tricky question is "Why are changes not brought up short and stopped in their tracks? At first sight, there seem to be all the reasons in the world why society should never let the changes through." He sees the reason for tolerating change in the fact that we already are used to "synchronic variation," to the extent that we are hardly aware of it. For example, when we hear the word "wicked," we automatically interpret it as either "evil" or "wonderful," depending on whether it is uttered by an elderly lady or a teenager. Deutscher speculates that "[i]n a hundred years' time, when the original meaning of 'wicked' has all but been forgotten, people may wonder how it was ever possible for a word meaning 'evil' to change its sense to 'wonderful' so quickly."

== Types ==
=== Phonetic and phonological changes ===
Sound change—i.e., change in the pronunciation of phonemes—can lead to phonological change (i.e., change in the relationships between phonemes within the structure of a language). For instance, if the pronunciation of one phoneme changes to become identical to that of another phoneme, the two original phonemes can merge into a single phoneme, reducing the total number of phonemes the language contains.

Determining the exact course of sound change in historical languages can pose difficulties, since the technology of sound recording dates only from the 19th century, and thus sound changes before that time must be inferred from written texts. The orthographical practices of historical writers provide the main (indirect) evidence of how language sounds have changed over the centuries. Poetic devices such as rhyme and rhythm can also provide clues to earlier phonetic and phonological patterns.

A principal axiom of historical linguistics, established by the linguists of the Neogrammarian school of thought in the 19th century, is that sound change is said to be "regular"—i.e., a given sound change simultaneously affects all words in which the relevant set of phonemes appears, rather than each word's pronunciation changing independently of each other. The degree to which the Neogrammarian hypothesis is an accurate description of how sound change takes place, rather than a useful approximation, is controversial; but it has proven extremely valuable to historical linguistics as a heuristic, and enabled the development of methodologies of comparative reconstruction and internal reconstruction that allow linguists to extrapolate backwards from known languages to the properties of earlier, unattested languages and hypothesize sound changes that may have taken place in them.

=== Lexical changes ===
The study of lexical changes forms the diachronic portion of the science of onomasiology.

The ongoing influx of new words into the English language (for example) helps make it a rich field for investigation into language change, despite the difficulty of defining precisely and accurately the vocabulary available to speakers of English. Throughout its history, English has not only borrowed words from other languages but has re-combined and recycled them to create new meanings, whilst losing some old words.

Dictionary writers try to keep track of the changes in languages by recording (and, ideally, dating) the appearance in a language of new words, or of new usages for existing words. By the same token, they may tag some words eventually as "archaic" or "obsolete."

=== Spelling changes ===
Standardization of spelling began after the invention of the printing press in the late 15th century, and was motivated by its usage. Differences in spelling often catch the eye of a reader of a text from a previous century. The pre-print era had fewer literate people: languages lacked fixed systems of orthography, and the manuscripts that survived often show words spelled according to regional pronunciation and to personal preference.

=== Semantic changes ===
Semantic changes are shifts in the meanings of existing words. Basic types of semantic change include:

- pejoration, in which a term's connotation goes from positive to negative
- amelioration, in which a term's connotations goes from negative to (more) positive
- broadening, in which a term acquires additional potential uses
- narrowing, in which a term's potential uses become more restrictive

After a word enters a language, its meaning can change through a shift in the valence of its connotations. As an example, when "villain" entered English it meant "peasant" or "farmhand," but acquired the connotation "low-born" or "scoundrel," and today only the negative use survives. Thus "villain" has undergone pejoration. Conversely, the word "wicked" is undergoing amelioration in colloquial contexts, shifting from its original sense of "evil," to the much more positive one as of 2009 of "brilliant."

Words' meanings may also change in terms of the breadth of their semantic domain. Narrowing a word limits its alternative meanings, whereas broadening associates new meanings with it. For example, "hound" (Old English hund) once referred to any dog, whereas in modern English it denotes only a particular type of dog. On the other hand, the word "dog" itself has been broadened from its Old English root "dogge," the name of a particular breed, to become the general term for all domestic canines.

=== Syntactic change ===
Syntactic change is the evolution of the syntactic structure of a natural language.

Over time, syntactic change is the greatest modifier of a particular language. Massive changes—attributable either to creolization or to relexification—may occur both in syntax and in vocabulary. Syntactic change can also be purely language-internal, whether independent within the syntactic component or the eventual result of phonological or morphological change.

== Sociolinguistics ==
The sociolinguist Jennifer Coates, following William Labov, describes linguistic change as occurring in the context of linguistic heterogeneity. She explains that "[l]inguistic change can be said to have taken place when a new linguistic form, used by some sub-group within a speech community, is adopted by other members of that community and accepted as the norm."

The sociolinguist William Labov recorded the change in pronunciation in a relatively short period in the American resort of Martha's Vineyard and showed how this resulted from social tensions and processes. Even in the relatively short time that broadcast media have recorded their work, one can observe the difference between the pronunciation of the newsreaders of the 1940s and the 1950s and the pronunciation of today. The greater acceptance and fashionability of regional accents in media may also reflect a more democratic, less formal society—compare the widespread adoption of language policies.

Can and Patton (2010) provide a quantitative analysis of twentieth-century Turkish literature using forty novels of forty authors. Using weighted least squares regression and a sliding-window approach, they show that, as time passes, words, in terms of both tokens (in text) and types (in vocabulary), have become longer. They indicate that the increase in word lengths with time can be attributed to the government-initiated language "reform" of the 20th century. This reform aimed at replacing foreign words used in Turkish, especially Arabic- and Persian-based words (since they were in majority when the reform was initiated in the early 1930s), with newly coined pure Turkish neologisms created by adding suffixes to Turkish word stems (Lewis, 1999).

Can and Patton (2010), based on their observations of the change of a specific word use (more specifically in newer works the preference of ama over fakat, both borrowed from Arabic and meaning "but," and their inverse usage correlation is statistically significant), also speculate that the word length increase can influence the common word choice preferences of authors.

Kadochnikov (2016) analyses the political and economic logic behind the development of the Russian language. Ever since the emergence of the unified Russian state in the 15th and 16th centuries the government played a key role in standardizing the Russian language and developing its prescriptive norms with the fundamental goal of ensuring that it can be efficiently used as a practical tool in all sorts of legal, judicial, administrative, and economic affairs throughout the country.

== Language shift and social status ==
Languages perceived to be "higher status" stabilize or spread at the expense of other languages perceived by their own speakers to be "lower status."

Historical examples are the early Welsh and Lutheran Bible translations, leading to the liturgical languages Welsh and High German thriving today, unlike other Celtic or German variants.

For prehistory, Forster and Renfrew (2011) argue that in some cases there is a correlation of language change with intrusive male Y chromosomes but not with female mtDNA. They then speculate that technological innovation (transition from hunting-gathering to agriculture, or from stone to metal tools) or military prowess (as in the abduction of British women by Vikings to Iceland) causes immigration of at least some males, and perceived status change. Then, in mixed-language marriages with these males, prehistoric women would often have chosen to transmit the "higher-status" spouse's language to their children, yielding the language/Y-chromosome correlation seen today.

== See also ==
- Calque
- Dialect continuum
- Grammaticalization
- Koiné language
- Language transfer
- Morphemization
- Neologism
- Origin of language
- Phono-semantic matching
- Variation (linguistics)
- Wave model (linguistics)
