= Stari Log, Kočevje =

Stari Log
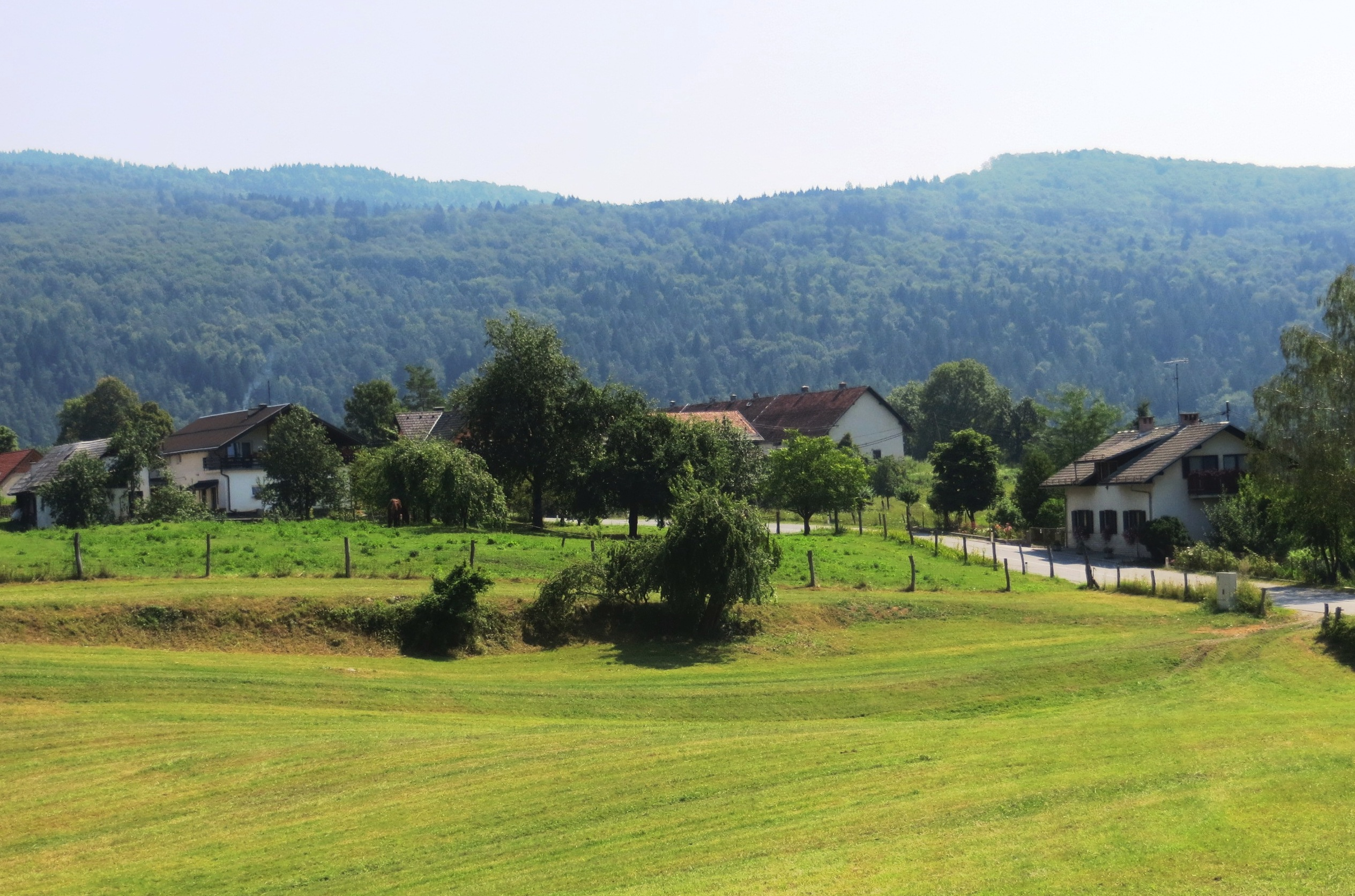

- Location in Slovenia
- Coordinates: 45°43′31.6″N 14°55′20.13″E
- Country: Slovenia
- Traditional region: Lower Carniola
- Statistical region: Southeast Slovenia
- Municipality: Kočevje

Area
  - Total: 19.95 km^{2} (7.70 sq mi)
- Elevation: 399.5 m (1,311 ft)

Population (2002)
  - Total: 58
- Postal code: 1332

Stari Log (pronounced [ˈstaːɾi ˈloːk]; German: Altlag, also Altlack, Gottscheerish: Autloag) is a settlement in the hills north of the town of Kočevje in southern Slovenia. The area is part of the traditional region of Lower Carniola and is now included in the Southeast Slovenia Statistical Region. The village has a cistern and traditional village pond. Raven Spring (Slovene: Krokarski studenec), a karst spring southwest of the village, is accessible by 13 flights of steps and was once an important site for hunting frogs.

== Name ==
The name Stari Log literally means 'old marshy meadow'. The name Log is shared with many other settlements in Slovenia and is derived from the Slovene word log 'partially forested (marshy) meadow near water' or 'woods near a settlement'. The standard German name Altlag and its Gottscheerish equivalent Autloag are based on the Slovene name. The prefix Alt- 'old' was added to the name to differentiate it from similar names.

== History ==
Stari Log was a village settled by Gottschee Germans. In the land registry of 1574 it had 14 half-farms and 11 tenant farmers, and a population between 75 and 85. In 1770 the village had 67 houses. Before the Second World War it was the second-largest Gottschee German settlement after the town of Kočevje, and the village had a band before the First World War. In 1941 most of its original population was evicted, with the exception of two Gottschee German families. In June 1942 the executive committee of the Liberation Front and the General Staff of the National Liberation Army and Partisan Detachments of Slovenia moved into the vicinity, making the village the center of the first Slovene territory liberated from Axis control. The village was not burned by Italian troops during the Rog Offensive because Italian troops planned to use it as a base. In March 1943 the Partisans burned the village to deny Italians forces the use of it. After the war, some of the houses were repaired and others completely rebuilt, and the village was settled by new arrivals, who joined the remaining two Gottschee German families. The Stari Log volunteer fire department became a founding unit of the Kočevje municipal fire department on 28 August 1955.

== Church ==
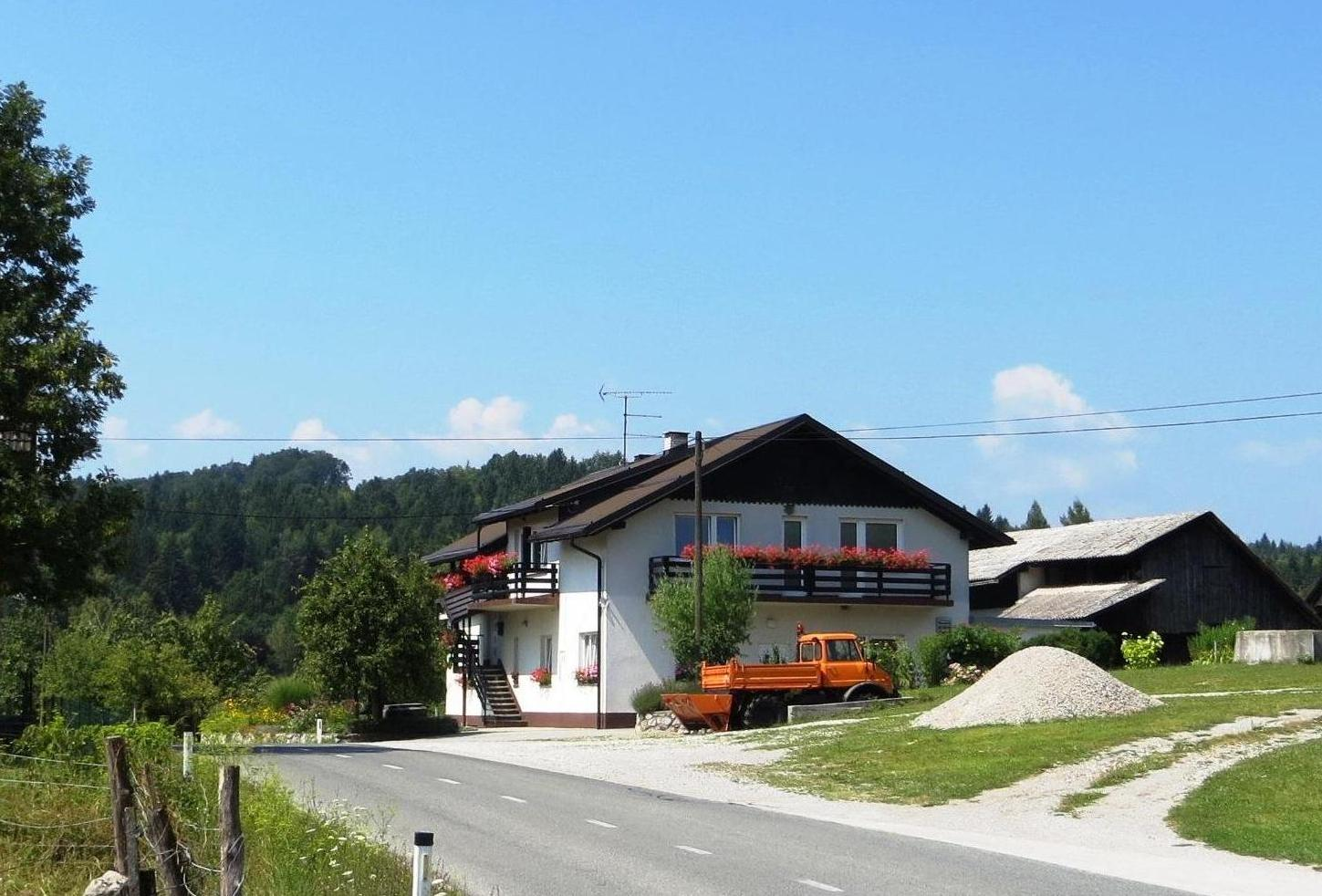
Site of former church

The local church, dedicated to Saint Margaret, was mentioned in written documents dating to 1360. In 1511 it was damaged by an earthquake and was rebuilt and extended. It was fortified as a defense against Ottoman raids. In 1691 it burned down and was rebuilt in the Baroque style. It was burned by the Partisans in 1943 and was demolished in 1955.

== Cultural heritage ==
In addition to the site of Saint Margaret's Church, two other sites in Stari Log are registered as cultural heritage:

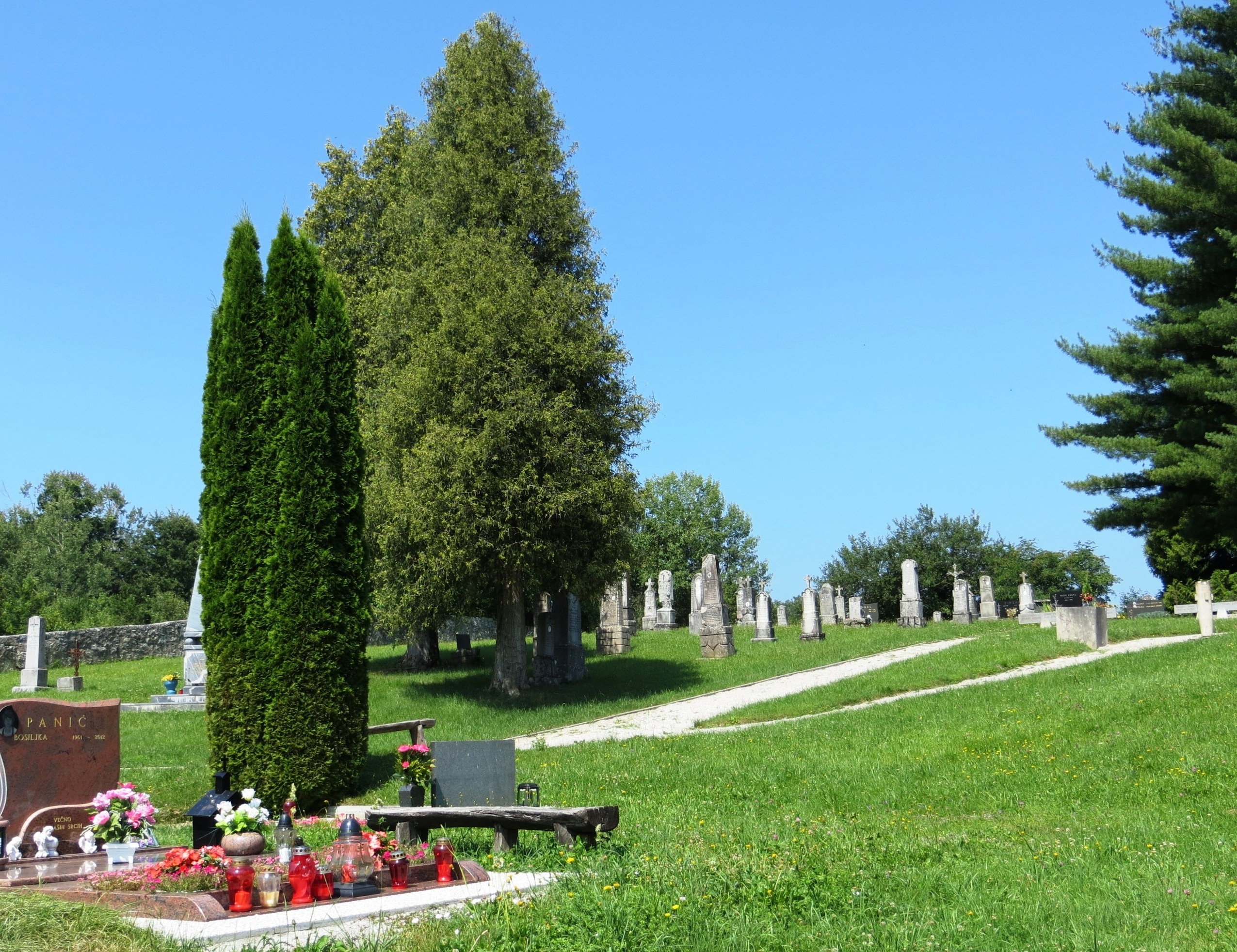
View from southeast

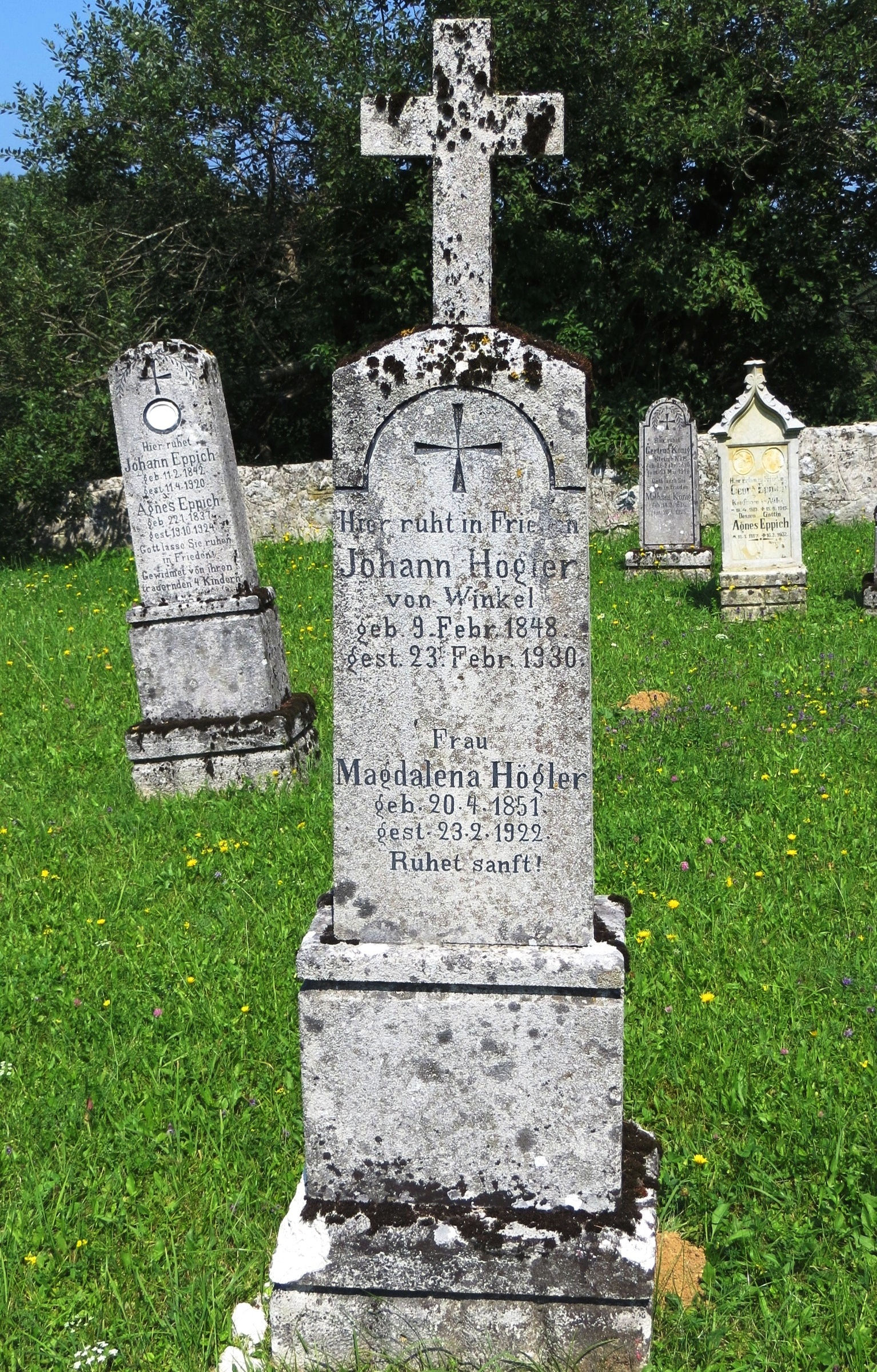
German gravestones

Stari Log Cemetery
- The village cemetery stands southwest of the settlement and was established after 1824. It is surrounded by a stone wall and contains the graves of original Gottschee German settlers as well as Slovene and other residents that settled the area after the Second World War. The Gottschee German stones were renovated in 1997. A third group of graves includes 74 Partisan soldiers and hostages from the Stari Log area that were killed in the Italian offensive of August 1942. This was set up in 1960 and renovated in 1997, and a hexagonal obelisk stands next to the grave site. The cemetery also contains the grave of the Slovene writer and poet Miran Jarc.
- At the north end of the village there is a monument commemorating the establishment of the Tone Tomšič Brigade on 16 July 1942. It is in the shape of a stone pillar and is surrounded by stone edging and greenery. The monument was unveiled in 1952. The text reads: To ped slovenske zemlje, na kateri so se 16. VII. 1942. na poziv svoje partije zbrali proletarci-partizani iz raznih slovenskih odredov v prvo proletarsko brigado Toneta Tomšiča posveča slovensko ljudstvo večnemu spominu na tiste slavne dni svoje revolucije, ko so začeli slovenski partizani pod vodstvom Centralnega komiteja KP Slovenije, v ognju italijanske ofenzive uresničevati genijalno zamisel tovariša Tita: ustvariti iz partizanskih odredov redno jugoslovansko armado. (This patch of Slovene land on which, on 16 July 1942, at the behest of their party, the proletarian Partisans gathered from various Slovene detachments into the first Tone Tomšic Proletarian Brigade, is dedicated by the Slovene people to the eternal memory of those glorious days of their revolution that the Slovene Partisans began under the leadership of the Central Committee of the Communist Party of Slovenia during the flames of the Italian offensive in order to realize the ingenious concept of Comrade Tito: to create a regular Yugoslav Army out of the Partisan detachments.)

== Notable people ==
Notable people that were born or lived in Stari Log include:

- Rihard Erker (1912–1986), technical writer and forestry engineer

== Gallery ==
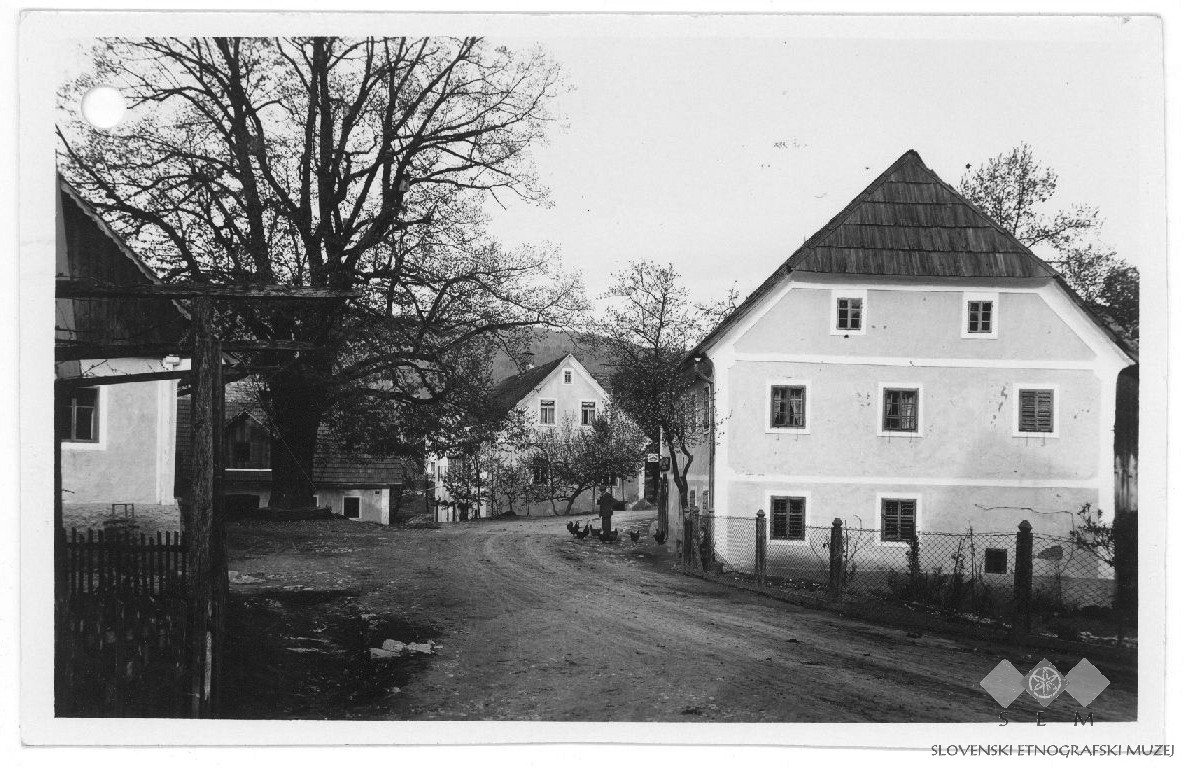
Historical view

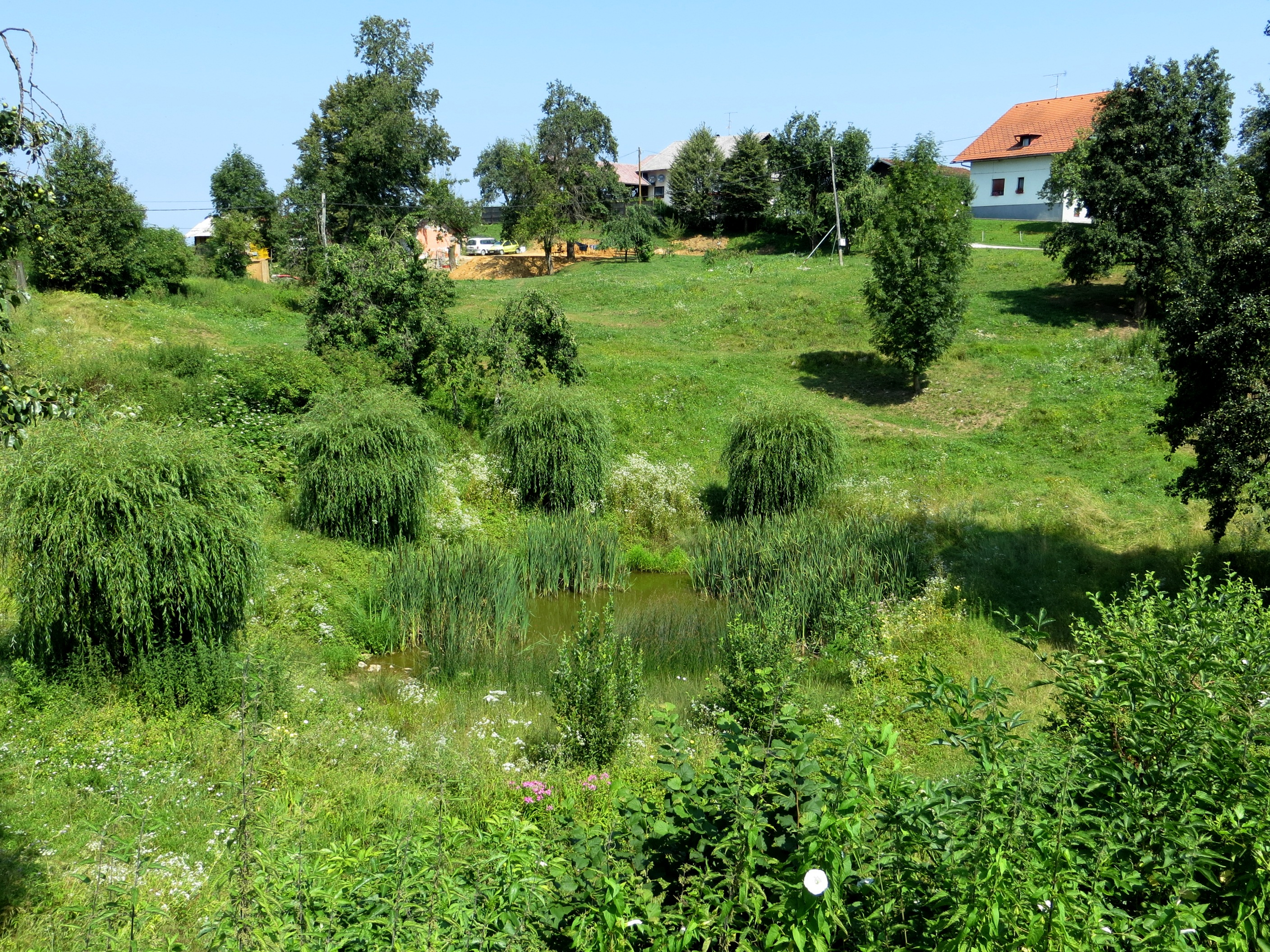
Village pond
