= Generative second-language acquisition =

Theory of learning a second language

The generative approach to second language (L2) acquisition (SLA) is a cognitive based theory of SLA that applies theoretical insights developed from within generative linguistics to investigate how second languages and dialects are acquired and lost by individuals learning naturalistically or with formal instruction in foreign, second language and lingua franca settings. Central to generative linguistics is the concept of Universal Grammar (UG), a part of an innate, biologically endowed language faculty which refers to knowledge alleged to be common to all human languages. UG includes both invariant principles as well as parameters that allow for variation which place limitations on the form and operations of grammar. Subsequently, research within the Generative Second-Language Acquisition (GenSLA) tradition describes and explains SLA by probing the interplay between Universal Grammar, knowledge of one's native language and input from the target language. Research is conducted in syntax, phonology, morphology, phonetics, semantics, and has some relevant applications to pragmatics.

Some of the main questions in GenSLA include:

1. whether UG is available to the adult L2 learner to guide acquisition and to what extent;
2. whether L2 learners can reset linguistic parameters from their L1;
3. whether second-language learners experience difficulties interfacing between different modules of the grammar;
4. whether child second language acquisition differs from that of adults.

As generative second language research endeavours to explain the totality of L2 acquisition phenomena, it is also concerned with investigating the extent of linguistic transfer, maturational effects on acquisition, and why some learners fail to acquire a target-like L2 grammar even with abundant input. Furthermore, studying L2 acquisition through a generative lens give linguists a better idea of the natural constraints on human languages and the inner workings of Universal Grammar.

Research in generative second-language acquisition is presented at a range of conferences, including: GASLA (Generative Approaches to Second Language Acquisition), GALANA (Generative Approaches to Language Acquisition - North America), and BUCLD (Boston University Conference on Language Development).

Prominent researchers of the topic include Suzanne Flynn of MIT, Bonnie Schwartz of University of Hawaii, Antonella Sorace of University of Edinburgh, and Lydia White of McGill University.

== History ==
=== Pre-GenSLA: 1960s-1970s ===
In the late 1960s-early 1970s researchers observed that the language and errors of L2 learners were not random but systematic and evidence of rule-governed behaviour. From this observation researchers proposed the concept of interlanguage which refers to the language system used by L2 learners that contains interacting linguistic aspects of both the L1 and L2. This system theory regarding the interlanguage suggests that L2 learners have mental grammars that can be described with rules and principles.

=== The Beginnings of GenSLA:1980-1990s ===
The history of GenSLA research begins in the 1980s prompted by two interconnected questions:

1. The logical problem of language acquisition
2. How the logical problem of language acquisition applies to L2 acquisition in adulthood.

The logical problem of language acquisition refers to the observable mismatch between the primary linguistic data (PLD) or language specific input a child is exposed to and the state of their eventual language system, that is, children appear to acquire their native language quickly and with little negative feedback even when the input is uneven, inconsistent and unrepresentative of their ultimate linguistic competence. Some suggest in an argument commonly known as Poverty of the Stimulus (POS) that there are, in fact, certain properties of language that are too abstract, subtle and complex to be acquired by language input and the operation of domain general cognitive mechanisms alone. Similarly, children are not exposed to a rich wealth of linguistic data to be able to acquire all the rules and principles of their distinct language. Therefore, an extra component, such as the UG which consists of innate domain-specific linguistic knowledge, is needed to account for these POV properties.

Subsequently, starting from the assumption of UG GenSLA researchers asked how the problem of language acquisition applies to L2 acquisition in adulthood. This encompassed questions about what similarities and differences exist between child L1 acquisition and adult L2 acquisition and, in particular, whether or not adults also have access UG. Indeed, most theories and research in the first two decades of GenSLA actually revolved around this singular question to which there are four proposed answers:

1. L2 learners have direct or full access to UG
2. L2 learners have partial access to UG
3. L2 learners have indirect access to UG
4. L2 learners have no access to UG.

GenSLA researchers assumed during these early decades that if they could show that a particular POS property operated or did not operate in L2 grammar they could generalize to other POS properties and to UG accessibility or non-accessibility in general. Because an L2 learner's L1 contains UG information available for transfer to their L2 it was thought that the strongest case for L2 access to UG would be evidence of knowledge in L2 learners that constituted instances of POS properties that are non-transferable. In other words, linguistic knowledge that could not be learned from L2 input, explicit learning, transfer from L1 knowledge, or the operation of domain general cognitive mechanisms.

=== Feature Focused: Late 1990s-early 2000s ===
The field of GenSLA research experienced significant theoretical developments in the late 1990s/early 2000s following changes in generative linguistic theory inspired by Chomsky's minimalist program. These changes shifted the debate from questions solely about access to UG to the consideration of specific features in L2 grammars and how they are represented. The features under consideration here are linguistic units that reflect grammatical meanings such as tense, case, number, person, gender, or conceptual meanings such as evidentiality, habitual aspect and definiteness

One key characteristic of these features is that they reflect variation across languages in their overtness, which became particularly important to GenSLA research. A feature of a word or phrase is said to be overt if there is surface evidence of its existence within that word or phrase. By contrast, a feature of a word or phrase is said to be covert if there is no surface evidence of its existence within that word or phrase. This made interesting predictions about adult L2 learning behaviour, for example, that L2 overt morphology should be easier to acquire if the learner has similar overt features in their L1. In one relevant study it was shown that Russian but not Japanese L2 learners of English were, in line with these predictions, reliably sensitive to English plural errors, (Russian has overt plural morphology while Japanese does not).

Another important element of these features for GenSLA research is interpretability. A feature is said to be interpretable if it contributes to sentence meaning and uninterpretable if it has grammatical significance only. This predicted that only meaningful features should be accessible to adult L2 learners and purely grammatical features should not be accessible for L1 transfer. No access and partial access theories sometimes adopted this distinction, arguing that it explains much variation attested in adult L2 grammars. For example, that Chinese speakers learning English as an L2 often omit third-person singular agreement morphology in obligatory contexts could easily be explained because these features are uninterpretable in Chinese.

=== New Populations: 2000s Onwards ===
By the 2000s it was generally accepted that adult SLA differed from child L1 acquisition in process and typical outcomes and there was evidence for adult accessibility in at least some properties of UG. This motivated GenSLA theory to shift focus from questions just about UG accessibility and specific features to describing and explaining variation at group and individual levels. The last decade has also seen a significant increase in GenSLA studies that examine SLA in populations complementary to L2 acquisition including heritage bilingualism, child L2 acquisition, and multilingual acquisition to gain new insights into the latter. For example, it was found that heritage bilinguals diverge from monolinguals in the ultimate state of their eventual language system in ways similar to adult L2 learners even though they are native speakers and even when the learning process takes places in a naturalistic setting in early childhood. This casts doubt on the critical period hypothesis (CP) that age is the determining factor in convergent language acquisition, another rich area of debate in GenSLA research With respect to child L2 acquisition, it was hypothesized that if child and adult L2 learners follow the same developmental path this would call into question the claims made by some GenSLA researchers that differences between L1 and L2 learners are due to the inaccessibility of UG. This is because in GenSLA child L2 learners under the age of 7 to 8 are hypothesized to have access to UG. Thus, if the developmental paths of child and adult L2 learners overlap significantly it is likely that the basis of difference is the shared experience they have with their L1. If, however, if they follow different developmental paths this would seem to support the claim that adult L2 learners do not have access to UG; their learning must instead be due to other factors. Finally, in multilingual acquisition, if it were shown that adult L2 learners can transfer POS properties only available from their L2 to their L3 or L4 etc. this could also be used to cast doubt on the CP hypothesize.

In addition, there has been a movement towards examining children's L2 acquisition. The study of child SLA is argued to be an important way of examining both child L1 acquisition and adult L2 acquisition. Unlike adults, children acquiring an L2 are considered to have full and direct access to Universal Grammar, and are typically more successful at retainment of the L2 and reaching a state of fluency. Some scholars have argued that examining child L2 acquisition is an essential tool in solving the debate over adult access to UG Most recent work on child L2 acquisition within generative framework has focused on the following 3 major issues:

1. L1 influence in child L2 acquisition,
2. The availability of functional categories (emphasis on the acquisition of tense-agreement and tense-aspect),
3. Morphological variability.

== Access Theories ==
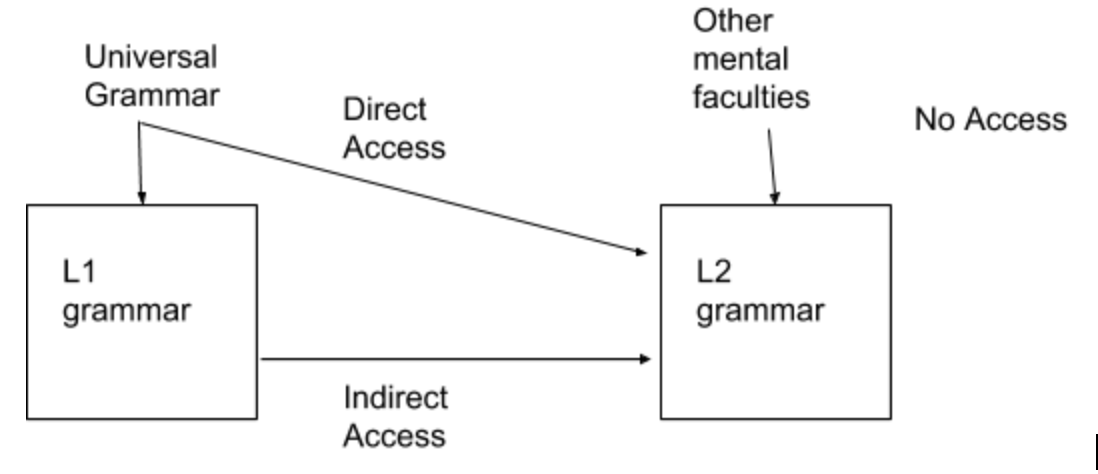
Access Theories

=== No Access ===
Theories of no access argue that adult second language learners do not have access to UG. One source of evidence for this position stems from research observations made in the 1970s and 80s that children experience a critical period or reduced ability over time to acquire a functional L1 morphosyntactic system that ends around puberty. L2 acquisition, however, does not share this similarity with late L1 acquisition, L2 learners being generally more successful than the latter. Additionally, child L2 and adult L2 learners differ greatly in the developmental paths they take and their ultimate attainment.

The Fundamental Difference Hypothesis refers to how linguistic methods of language acquisition applied in early childhood are not available for adult learners, which points to a fundamental difference in access to UG between child and adult learners. Adult L2 acquisition resembles the process of general adult learning in fields where there is no domain-specific learning system believed to exist.

=== Direct Access ===
Theories of direct access argue that UG is still directly accessible to adult second language learners, in addition to syntactic property transfer from their L1. Evidence for this position stems from research observations that although child L1 and adult L2 grammars differ, adult L2 grammars do exhibit evidence of POS properties that cannot be linked to transfer from their native language or learning. For example, adult L2 learners show knowledge of parameter settings other than those of their first language. In direct access theories the differences between adult and children must subsequently be explained on the basis of something other than UG accessibility. Many propose that it is in fact this difference between the L1 initial state and L2 initial state that accounts for the differences, when comparing child SLA learners and adult SLA learners. Advocates of this position also frequently tried to show that learners are stuck within principles and parameter settings exemplified in their L1.

Some experts have commented that theories of direct access could also be characterized as direct access since the learner is not restricted only to UG principles and parameter settings of the L1 grammar due to the resetting and restructuring that occurs with the learning of the L2.

Some relevant theories that assume access to UG in adulthood and propose other factors as cause of differences between L1 and L2 acquisition: Missing Surface Inflection Hypothesis, Feature Reassembly Hypothesis, Prosodic Transfer Hypothesis, Interface Hypothesis.

=== Indirect Access ===
The indirect access viewpoint considers the possibility that access to a second language grammar is first through a first language, where the second language then causes a resetting and restructuring of the learners understanding of grammar once they have been exposed to the second language.

=== Partial Access ===
Theories of partial access argue that L2 learners have partial, but not full access to UG through their L1.

== Generative SLA in the Classroom ==
=== Teaching ESL ===
Scholars in Generative SLA have suggested that their research is relevant in developing effective methods of teaching a second language in classroom settings including bilingual, immersion, second dialect education and second language literacy programs. Practical GenSLA researchers seek to go beyond "passive" acquisition and utilize theories in SLA to efficiently teach L2s. The practical application of GenSLA is based on what is necessary or unnecessary to teach based on UG access. For example, it is generally accepted that prepositional modifiers can be accessed in UG, and because of this it may not be efficient to teach them explicitly. However, other grammatical issues such as topic and focus structures are not innate, and therefore second language learners benefit from explicit teaching. Additionally, GenSLA research can be used with relation to topics processing, practice and orthography, and be extended beyond mere production. Research on practical, educational usage of GenSLA theories have been explored in L2s such as Spanish, English, German and French.

=== Aiding Populations with Special Language Learning Needs ===
It has been suggested that GenSLA research could be used to aid populations with special language learning needs, for example, it might be used to develop language intervention programs using methods similar to those implemented in second language teaching to help children with down syndrome or Alzheimers patients. Insights from GenSLA could also help multilingual children by ensuring educators not confuse problems of second language acquisition with learning disabilities, bilinguals undergoing primary language loss or deaf and hearing children learning sign language as a first or second language.

== Applications: Word Order Acquisition ==
There have been debates regarding how one can apply the principles of Generative L2 Acquisition to individuals acquiring a second language with a different word order from their L1 (for example individuals whose L1 was SOV and are now learning a SVO language, or vice versa). Some researchers have hypothesized that on the basis of the full transfer full access theory, individuals will use L1 grammar and parameter setting initially during their acquisition of L2, but would still have access to the UG. This notion contains features of both the direct and indirect theories of UG, which involves some form of access to the UG. However, research has shown that not all individuals acquiring the L2 will produce transfers from their L1, as the transfer process depends on the structural components of the L1. Instead, some linguists have argued that the process of second language acquisition can be accounted for by general learning principles and in fact not does correspond to having access to the UG. Therefore, this particular issue of different word-order acquisition can be used to call into question if the direct access theory of UG is relevant to second language acquisition, or if a no access theory is more plausible.

== Criticism ==
There has been some criticism regarding Generative L2 Acquisition on the basis of methodology and other linguistic theories.

=== Methodological Issues ===
There have been claims that there are several methodological issues in generative research. The subjects need to have a requisite level of the L2 to see if a principle is operating in their interlanguage grammar. Furthermore, complex structures are often needed to test for interlanguage grammar, and the speakers need to be able to competently engage with the structures within their current L2 capacity. It is also difficult to rule out the influence of the L1, if the languages present similar principles that are in question. One of the most controversial methodological issues in generative second language acquisition is regarding what L2 data is collected. There is a need to obtain information about competence rather than performance, and it is difficult to obtain samples which contain the complex structures necessary to observe UG-related parameters and principles. Elicited data is preferred, but still problematic based on the skill level of the speaker, and is not considered naturally occurring speech.

=== The Minimal Tree Hypothesis ===
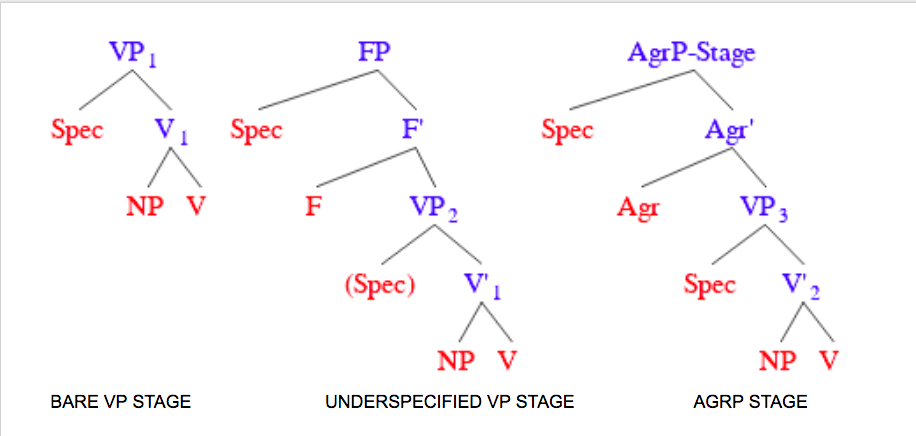
Stages in Minimal Trees Hypothesis

The Minimal Trees Hypothesis (MTH) is a highly debated hypothesis which is concerned with the distinction between Functional Categories and Lexical Categories during language transfer. Based on a study of adult SLA learners of German, Korean and Turkish, this hypothesis asserts that only lexical categories transfer from the L1, and functional categories develop over time. This development has also been termed "organic grammar", in which the development of functional categories develop from Verb Phrase (VP)→ Inflection Phrase (IP)→ Complementizer Phrase (CP). The phases have been termed the "Bare VP Stage", the "Underspecified VP Stage" and the "Agr-P Stage" The controversy surrounding the MTH has to do with methodological problems and theoretical problems which emerge in the hypothesis. With regard to the methodological problems, the MTH has issue pertaining to performance vs. competence in data collection. The theoretical problems which exist in the hypothesis relate to the role of input, the transfer of lexical categories, and the development of previous linguistic theories and research regarding L2 Acquisition research. The theoretical basis of the MTH has been contested by many researchers, which call into question the validity of the hypothesis. Vainikka & Young-Scholten themselves, the originators of the hypothesis, acknowledge that their theory is more "radical" than what is often seen in generative SLA academia. Despite the controversial nature of the hypothesis, MTH has been considered an extremely strong and valuable contribution to SLA research and generative grammar as a whole.

=== The Logical Problem of Acquisition ===
Some researchers deny the existence of any domain specific linguistic knowledge. They contest the existence of the logical problem of acquisition and the existence of UG hypothesized to fill the alleged explanatory gap. If this is true it would throw the generative approach to SLA into question. Supporters of GenSLA argue, however, that in order to disprove the logical problem of acquisition detractors would have to either show there are no instances of poverty of stimulus properties or when input alone is insufficient, one needs to explain the child's resulting competence in virtue of the operation of domain general cognitive mechanisms, statistical learning or processing considerations. They subsequently point to the fact that this has not yet been attempted exhaustively and no parsimonious alternatives have been offered to explain how poverty of stimulus properties are acquired. The logical problem of language acquisition is thought to prevail so long as there are any poverty of stimulus properties that cannot otherwise be accounted for.

== Beyond L2 ==
The recent decades have witnessed an expansion of L2 field to L3 acquisition. The main researchers and publishing venues remained the same while the number of models and hypotheses regarding multilingual language acquisition have soared. Nearly all of them are nested in generative linguistics. There are three main groups of models: partial transfer, wholesale transfer, and those rejecting transfer. The key question on which the models differ is what the source of linguistic transfer is, and what the role of previous languages are.

Model	Proposal	Key references
Partial transfer
Full Transfer Potential	The initial state of the L2 is the L1 plus the genetic endowment for language acquisition: • The complete grammar of the L1 remains active/accessible (so no need to make a copy of it). • L2 (like L1) is learning by parsing: If there is an identical or similar "micro-cue" available in the L1, this will be used to parse the L2; If there is no similar structure in the L1 grammar, the learner resorts to Universal Grammar • Any property of the L1 may transfer. Transfer takes place property by property.	See Marit Westergaard;
Linguistic Proximity Model	Ln acquisition involves incremental property-by-property learning and allows for both facilitative and non-facilitative influence (transfer) from one or both previously acquired languages. Crosslinguistic influence occurs when a particular linguistic property in the Ln input reveals abstract structural similarity with linguistic properties of the previously learned languages.	See Marit Westergaard;
Scalpel Model	The activated grammatical possibilities of the L1-plus-L2 combined grammar act with a scalpel-like precision, rather than as a blunt object, to extract the enhancing, or facilitative, options of L1 or L2 grammars. However, additional factors such as processing complexity, misleading input, and construction frequency in the target L3 are also operative property by property.	See Romyana Slabakova;
Rejection of transfer
Cumulative-Enhancement Model	CEM proposes that language learning is guided by the principle "the more languages you learn, the easier it gets". The authors suggest that language learning is fundamentally cumulative and all previous language knowledge is available for a language learner: for example, in learning L3, both L1 and L2 are accessible.	See Suzanne Flynn;
The Intermediate	The Intermediate rejects the notion of transfer and proposes that linguistic representation are shared between languages via a consolidating function, thus better accounting for such phenomena as co-activation, code-switching, and cumulativity of language learning (see the model above). The languages are treated as distinct sets, but as sets with nonempty intersections. More fundamentally, The Intermediate also rejects linguistic typology and typological proximity.	
Wholesale transfer
L1 Privilege Model	L1 plays the key role in acquisition of any subsequent language; this is attributed solely to the factor that L1 is the native language.	
L2 Status Model	L2 Status claims that L2 will play the key role in subsequent language acquisition because whereas L1 was acquired in infancy, L2 and L3 share the mode of acquisition—in adulthood. This similarity makes L2 the key source for L3 regardless of typology or anything else.	
Language of Community	Dominant spoken or signed language in a community of speakers serves as the source of transfer for L3.	
Typological Proximity Model	TPM is based on the notion of psycho(typology): between L1 and L2, whichever language is "closer" to L3 serves as a substrate for L3. TPM hypothesizes that the entire grammar of either L1 or L2 is transferred to serve as the basis for L3. Language learner then proceeds by error-driven revision.	

== See also ==
- Theories of second-language acquisition
- Second language acquisition
- Poverty of the stimulus
- Universal Grammar
- Generative Grammar
