= Bilingual lexical access =

Bilingual lexical access is an area of psycholinguistics that studies the activation or retrieval process of the mental lexicon for bilingual people.

Bilingual lexical access can be understood as all aspects of the word processing, including all of the mental activity from the time when a word from one language is perceived to the time when all its lexical knowledge from the target language is available. Research in this field seeks to fully understand these mental processes. Bilingual individuals have two mental lexical representations for an item or concept and can successfully select words from one language without significant interference from the other language. It is the field's goal to understand whether these dual representations interact or affect one another.

Bilingual lexical access researchers focus on the control mechanisms bilinguals use to suppress the language not in use when in a monolingual mode and the degree to which the related representations within the language not in use are activated. For example, when a Dutch-English bilingual is asked to name a picture of a dog in English, they will come up with the English word dog. Bilingual lexical access is the mental process that underlies this seemingly simple task: the process that makes the connection between the idea of a dog and the word dog in the target language. While activating the English word dog, its Dutch equivalent (hond) is most likely also in a state of activation.

== History ==
Early research of bilingual lexical access was based on theories of monolingual lexical access. These theories relied mainly upon generalizations without specifying how lexical access works.

Subsequent advancement in medical science has improved understanding of psycholinguistics, resulting in more detailed research and a deeper understanding of language production. "Many early studies of second language acquisition focused on the morphosyntactic development of learners and the general finding was that bound morphemes appear in the same order in the first and second language". In addition, "second language learners are also able to produce and process simple sentences before complex sentences (Pienemann et al. 2005), just like first language learners", of which there are 2 models proposed: serial search models and parallel access models. Serial search models propose that when monolinguals encounter a word, they will look through all the lexical entries to distinguish whether the input item is a word or not; if it is, they will only retrieve the necessary information about that word (i.e., its semantics or orthography). Lexical access is accessed sequentially, with one item at a time. In contrast, the parallel access models approach asserts that multiple entries can be activated at once, which means that the perceptual input from a word would activate all lexical items directly, even though some of them might not be necessary. In this way, numbers of potential candidates would be activated simultaneously and then the lexical candidates which are most consistent with the input stimulus would be chosen. Researchers addressed that both the serial and parallel processes are used for lexical organization and lexical access.

Knowledge of monolingual access led to the question of bilingual lexical access. Early models of bilingual lexical access shared similar characteristics with these monolingual lexical access models; the bilingual models began by focusing on if bilingual lexical access would be different from monolinguals. In addition, to study the activation process in a separate language, they also investigated whether the lexical activation would be processed in a parallel fashion for both languages or selectively processed for the target language. The bilingual models also study whether the bilingual system has a single lexicon combining words from both languages or separate lexicons for words in each language.

With the occurrence of widespread computational modeling, researchers extended the theoretical approaches for the studies of bilingual lexical access. The computational models are now an essential component for mainstream theories, for example, the models of Bilingual Interactive Activation (BIA) model, the Semantic, Orthographic and Phonological Interactive Activation (SOPIA) model, and the Bilingual interactive Model of Lexical Access (BLMOLA). Most computational models need to specify all the vague descriptive notions used in the earlier models and force researchers to clarify their theories. Those revised models test the viability of the original theories by comparing the empirical results with data generated from the model. Computational models are also able to generate new testable hypotheses and allow researchers to manipulate conditions which might not be possible in normal experiments. For example, researchers can investigate and simulate the lexical access systems under various states of damage without using aphasic subjects.

== Hypotheses ==
The two most prominent theories on lexical access for bilinguals, Language Selective Access and Language Non-Selective Access, attempt to explain the process and stages of lexical activation and selection. These hypotheses focus on determining whether lexical candidates from different languages that share similar lexical features are activated when a word is presented. For instance, when the Dutch word work is activated, is the English word pork also activated? If the answer is "no", it might suggest that language selection happens before the recognition of a word and only the lexical information of the target language is selectively activated, in which case lexical access is language selective. If the answer is "yes", it might suggest the other possibility that the recognition of a word is processed in parallel for both languages and the lexical information of both languages are activated, in which case lexical access is language non-selective. Research pertaining to lexical access has indicated that it is not achievable to completely suppress a known language.

=== Language-selective access ===
Language-selective access is the exclusive activation of information in the contextually appropriate language system. It implies when a bilingual encounters a spoken or written word, the activation is restricted to the target language subsystem which contains the input word.

One interpretation is that bilinguals initially make a decision about the language of the word and then activate the appropriate language-selected lexicon. In this mechanism, an executive system directs the language switch for the input word. In earlier studies, researchers found that bilinguals can comprehend passages composed of words entirely from only one language more quickly than passages composed of words from both languages. They explain this result as an involuntary switch that happens when bilinguals comprehend passages with two languages. When comprehension procedures in one language fail due to the language contextually changing, then the switch mechanism will automatically direct input to another language system. Therefore, bilinguals are slower at reading mixed language passages than at single language passages because they must spend time switching languages. However, those studies failed to consider that the two languages might be activated simultaneously and there might be a later lexical competition in choosing which language information to use. The later lexical competition can also be used to explain why bilinguals spend more time understanding passages in mixed languages. However, other studies have found that there is no significant cost incurred by inter-sentential language switching and mixing. A 2010 paper showed that there was no cost to switching between languages when bilinguals read sentences for comprehension. Additionally, a 2012 paper found that when making metalinguistic judgments and performing non-comprehension based tasks, switch costs were evident, but there was no evidence to support the hypothesis that there is a cost at the switch site when bilinguals read a mixed sentence, indicating that under normal circumstances and given sufficient linguistic context, language switching does not incur a cost.

In studies that investigate whether lexical candidates from different languages are activated selectively or non-selectively during bilingual lexical access, there are two basic types of stimuli used: interlingual homographs and cognates. Interlingual homographs are words from two languages that are identical in their orthography but differ in their meaning or phonology; for example, the English word "room" is spelled identically to the Dutch word for "cream". Cognates are words from two languages that are identical (or very similar) in orthography and also have a large overlap in their meaning; for instance, the word film is a cognate in English and Dutch. Researchers used those types of stimuli to investigate if bilinguals process them in the same way as the matched control words which occur only in one language. If the reaction time (RT) of interlingual homographs is the same as the controlled monolingual word, then it supports the language-selective access hypothesis. If RT is significantly different for interlingual homographs than for the controlled monolingual word, it supports the language-nonselective access hypothesis.

In most early studies, researchers did not find clear RT differences between test items (interlexical homographs or cognates) and control items. For example, in Gerard and Scarborough's word recognition research with English monolinguals and Spanish–English bilinguals, cognates, interlingual homographs, and non-homographic control words were used. The cognates and control words were either high frequency or low frequency in both English and Spanish. The homographic non-cognates were high frequency in English and low frequency in Spanish or vice versa. The results generally supported the language-selective hypothesis. Even though there was a significant main effect of word type for the bilingual group, it was mainly caused by the slow response to interlingual homographs which were of low frequency in the target language but of high frequency in the non-target language. Results showed that there was no significant difference in the reaction time between bilinguals and monolinguals, which suggested that lexical access for bilinguals in this study was restricted to only one language.

=== Language-nonselective access ===
Language-nonselective access is the automatic co-activation of information in both linguistic systems. It implies that when a bilingual encounters a spoken or written word, the activation happens in parallel in both contextually appropriate and inappropriate linguistic subsystems. Also, there is evidence that bilinguals take longer than monolinguals to detect non-words while in both bilingual and monolingual modes, providing evidence that bilinguals do not fully deactivate their other language while in a monolingual mode.

Despite the observed null results which support the language-selective access, a sizable number of studies suggest that language-nonselective access takes place and it is highly unlikely to completely suppress the other language. For example, Dijkstra, van Jaarsveld and Brinke used an English lexical decision task for Dutch–English bilinguals on a list of a cognate, homographs, and English-control words. Although they did not find a significant difference in reaction time between interlingual homographs and English control words, they found that there was a significant facilitation effect of the cognates, which could be supportive evidence for the assumption of language-nonselective access. Later, De Moor repeated the English lexical decision study by Dijkstra et al. and found that the Dutch meaning of the interlingual homographs was also activated by English–Dutch bilinguals. After each homographic trial, she performed trials that translated previous homographs' Dutch definitions into English. For example, after the trial homographic word "brand", the English-translated "fire" would be presented. De Moor found there was a small but significant translation priming effect for subsequent English translation trials; it suggested that the lexical information of the Dutch word form was also activated, even though it did not affect the reaction time of the previous homographic trial.

Cross-linguistic influence can be understood as the various ways that two or more languages relate in the mind and affect a person's linguistic performance or development. Cross-linguistic effects of orthographic and semantic overlap between different languages of cognates and interlingual homographs were also reported in many priming studies. For example, Beauvillain and Grainger had French–English bilinguals make English lexical decisions on target strings primed by French words, which was told to the participants. The homographic primes were French words that were either semantically related to the English words (e.g., "coin": "money" in English, "corner" in French) or not related. The results showed that bilinguals responded faster in related conditions than in unrelated conditions. Even though the participants knew that the prime words always associated with their French meaning, they were still affected by the English meaning of the homographic prime words. In later studies, researchers masked the briefly presented prime words to prevent participants from using conscious strategies. For instance, Sáchez-Casas et al. used Spanish–English bilinguals in a semantic categorization task on Spanish target words. They used three types of priming conditions: entirely identical cognates or non-cognates (rico-rico; pato-pato), translations of cognates or non-cognates (rich-rico; duck-pato) and non-word primes combined with cognate or non-cognate targets as a control condition (rict-rico vs. wuck-pato). They found that bilinguals responded to the cognate translation conditions as fast as the identical conditions, but the non-cognate translation was as slow as the control conditions.

== In language comprehension ==
Once bilinguals acquire the lexical information from both languages, bilingual lexical access activates in language comprehension. "Lexical access in comprehension" is the process of how people make contact with lexical representation in their mental lexicon that contains the information, which enables them to understand the words or sentences. Word recognition is the most essential process of bilingual lexical access in language comprehension, in which researchers investigate the selective or non-selective recognition of isolated words. At the same time, sentence processing also plays an important role in language comprehension, where researchers can investigate if the presence of words in a sentence context restricts lexical access only to the target language.

== In word recognition ==
Word recognition is usually used in both narrow and broad ways. When it is used in the narrow sense, it means the moment when a match occurs between a printed word and its orthographic word-form stored in the lexicon, or a match between a spoken word and its phonological word-form. Only after this match has taken place, all the syntactical and morphological information of the word and the meaning of the word will become accessible for further processing. In a broader way, it refers to lexical access is the entire period from the matching processing to the retrieval of lexical information. In the research of bilingual lexical access, word recognition uses single, out-of-context words from both languages to investigate all the aspects of bilingual lexical access.

=== Main methodological tasks in word recognition ===
In word recognition studies, the cognate or interlingual homograph effects are most often used with the following tasks:

- Word naming task: A participant is presented with a drawing or object and is asked to name the drawing or the object. Response latencies (the time it takes to make a response) are usually recorded for each word; sometimes response accuracies are recorded as well. A named example is the Boston Naming Test, which has been used in various studies that examine bilingual lexical access.
- Lexical decision task: Participants are presented with written letter sequences and are asked to determine if each sequence is a word. Response times and/or accuracy are recorded. Usually, the nonword stimuli are pseudowords—sequences that obey the orthography and/or phonology of the test language but lack meaning. There are two versions of decision task which are developed especially to study bilingual lexical access in word recognition: generalized lexical decision and language-specific lexical decision. In a generalized lexical decision task, the lexical decision is made for both languages. The "yes" response is required if the presented letter sequence is a word in either language. In a language-specific lexical decision task, the "yes" response must be only given to the words from the target language.
- Word priming task: Participants are presented with a prime word before they respond to each target word. The prime words are either lexically related or unrelated to the target words, and the effect of the prime on target word processing will be measured. A target word that follows a related prime tends to have a faster response latency than a target word preceded by an unrelated prime.

=== Models of bilingual lexical access in word recognition ===
Most current models in word recognition assume that bilingual lexical access is nonselective, which also take into account the demands of task and context-dependence of processing.

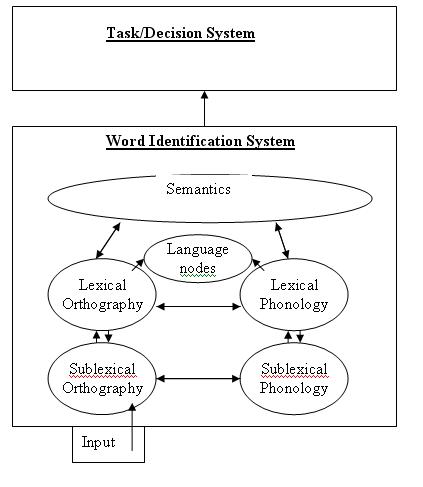
A flow chart representation of the BIA+ model for bilingual language processing including the word identification and task/decision subsystems.

==== Bilingual interactive activation (BIA) model ====
The BIA model is an implemented connectionist model of bilingual visual word recognition. This language-nonselective model is structured by four levels of different linguistic representations: letter features, letters, words, and language tags (or language node). When a word is presented by this model, the features of its constituted letters are activated first. Then, these letter features work together and activate the letters of which they are part of the presented words. In turn, these letters activate the words of that language. The word candidates activate the language nodes which are connected and simultaneously send feedback activation to the letter level. Language nodes can also inhibit the activation of word candidates from other languages (e.g., the English language node reduces the activation of Dutch word candidates). After a complex interactive process of activation and inhibition, the lexical candidate corresponding to the presented word becomes the most active word unit.

==== Inhibitory control model (IC) ====
The IC model is complementary to the BIA model. It focuses on the importance of task demands and regulation that happened during language processing by modifying the levels of activation of items in the language network. In this model, a key concept is the language task schema, which specifies the mental processing steps that bilinguals take to perform a particular language task. The language task schema regulates the output from the word identification system by altering the activation levels of representations within that system by inhibiting outputs from it. For example, when a bilingual switches from one language to another in translation, a change in the language schema corresponding to the languages must take place.

==== Language mode framework ====
In the language model framework, language processing mechanisms and languages as a whole can be achieved to different extents. The relative activation state of language is called language mode, and it is influenced by many factors, such as the person spoke or listened to, users’ language proficiency, the non-linguistic context and so on. Language users can be in a bilingual mode if they are talking to other bilinguals or reading text with mixed languages. However, if they listen to someone who is monolingual or is just speaking one language, the activation state would switch to a more monolingual mode. Based on this model, the bilinguals' language mode depends on the language users' expectation and by language environment.

==== Bilingual interactive activation plus (BIA+) model ====
The BIA+ model is an extension and adaptation of the BIA model. The BIA+ model includes not only an orthographic representation and language nodes, but also phonological and semantic representations. All these representations are assumed to be part of a word identification system that provides output to a task/decision system. The information flow in bilingual lexical processing proceeds exclusively from the word identification system toward a task/decision system without any influence of this task/decision system on the activation state of words.

== In sentence processing ==
Most current studies of bilingual lexical access are based on the comprehension of isolated words without considering whether contextual information affects lexical access in bilinguals. However, in everyday communication, words are most often encountered in a meaningful context and not in isolation (e.g. in a newspaper article). Research done by Déprez (1994) has shown that mixed utterances in children are not limited to the lexical level but also in the areas of morphology, syntax, and pronunciation. Researchers also began to investigate the cognitive nature of bilingual lexical access in context by examining word recognition in sentences.

=== The main methodological tasks in sentence processing ===
In sentence processing, a number of online measuring techniques are exploited to detect cognitive activity at the very moment it takes place or only slightly after. Cognates and interlingual homographs are often used as markers that are inserted in test sentences with the following tasks:

- Self-paced reading: Participants are faced with a screen on which a text appears in successive segments. They are asked to process each sequent segment by pressing a key. A trial starts with the presentation of groups of dashes separated by spaces. Each group serves as a placeholder for a word in the text with each dash representing a letter. When the participant presses the key, the first segment appears (in this example, two words) and replaces the corresponding placeholders for the words on the right while the placeholders for the words on the left remain on the screen. When the key is pressed again, the two words from the first segment are replaced by their placeholders again and the next segment appears and takes the position of the corresponding placeholders. This continues until the whole text has been read. A follow-up comprehension question is presented to ensure that participants indeed pay attention to the meaning of the sentences. The interval between the two successive key presses is measured and registered as the response time.
- Rapid serial visual presentation: Participants are presented with successive segments/words at a fixed rate in the same location on the screen. In this task, the participants cannot control the speed of reading; the experimenter determines the presentation speed. The participants are required to read the words aloud and their reaction time of each segment is registered. A follow-up comprehension question is presented to ensure that participants paid attention to the meaning of the sentences. A pictured object can be readily detected in a rapid serial visual presentation sequence when the target is specified by a superordinate category name such as animal or vehicle.
- Eye tracking (or eye-movement recording): This task records the participants’ eye movements and eye fixations as they read a text presented on a computer screen. It documents what the participants are looking at and also how long it takes for them. Experimental eye-tracking data is obtained to investigate topics such as understanding of spoken language, cognitive processes related to spoken language, body language and lip-reading, etc.

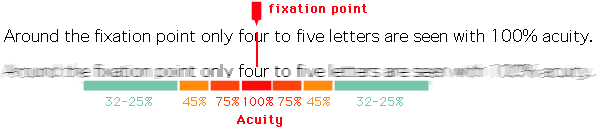
A diagram demonstrating the acuity of foveal vision in reading

=== Studies of bilingual lexical access in sentence processing ===
The question of whether the presentation of words in a sentence context restricts lexical access to words of the target language only is studied mostly in bilinguals' second language (L2) processing. This sentence context effect might be an efficient strategy to speed up the lexical search because it reduces the number of lexical candidates. For example, Elston-Guttler et al. showed that cross-lingual activation is very sensitive to the influence of a sentence context and previous activation state of the two languages in a semantic priming study. In their study, German–English bilinguals were presented with relatively low-constraint sentences in which a homograph (e.g., "The woman gave her friend a pretty GIFT"; "gift" means poison in German) or a control word was presented at the end (e.g., The woman gave her friend a pretty SHELL). "Constraint" means the degree to which the sentence frame preceding the target word biased that word. The sentence was then replaced by a target word (poison) for the lexical decision task. They found that for participants who saw a German film prior to the experiment and only in the first block of the experiment, they recognized the target faster after primed with the related homograph sentence than primed with the controlled sentence. This suggests that bilinguals can quickly "zoom into" the L2 processing situation even when the L1 activation was boosted.

Schwartz and Kroll used cognates and homographs as target words presented in low- and high-constraint sentences to Spanish–English bilinguals. They investigated word presentation and the semantic constraint modulated language lexical access in bilinguals. Schwartz and Kroll used rapid serial visual presentation where the target word had to be named. No homograph effects were found, but less proficient bilinguals made more naming errors, particularly in low-constraint sentences. They observed cognate facilitation (nonselective bilingual lexical access) in low-constraint sentences, but not in high-constraint ones. The results suggest that the semantic constraint of a sentence may restrict cross-lingual activation effects. Similar results on cognate effects were obtained by van Hell and de Groot in their study of Dutch–English bilinguals in an L2 lexical decision task and a translation task in forward (from L1 to L2) and in the backward direction (from L2 to L1). Libben and Titone used the eye-tracking methodology and found that the cognate facilitation in semantically constraint sentences only happened at early stages of comprehension and rapidly resolved at later stages of comprehension.

Although most studies on bilingual sentence processing focus on L2 processing, there are still a few studies that have investigated cross-language activation during their native language (L1) reading. For example, van Assche et al. replicated the cognate effect in L1 with Dutch–English bilinguals, and found that a non-dominant language may affect native-language sentence reading, both at earliest and at later reading stages. Titone et al. observed this cross-language activation in English-French bilinguals at early reading stages only when the L2 was acquired early in life. They also concluded that the semantic constraint provided by a sentence can attenuate cross-language activation at later reading stages.

== See also ==
- Bilingual lexicon
- Bilingual memory
- Lexicon
