= Marit Westergaard =

Norwegian linguist

- Born: Tromsø municipality
- Citizenship: Norway
- Occupations: Professor, Department of Language and Culture; Director of AcqVa Aurora group
- Known for: Second language acquisition, third language acquisition, linguistics
- Title: Professor, Professor II
- Awards: Member of The NASL, Academia Borealis

Academic background
- Education: MA in Linguistics, UC San Diego, Cand. Phil in Linguistics and German, University of Tromsø, D.Phil in Linguistics, University of Tromsø
- Alma mater: University of Tromsø
- Thesis: The Development of Word Order in Norwegian Child Language: The Interaction of Input and Economy Principles in the Acquisition of V2 (2005)

Academic work
- Discipline: Language Acquisitionist, Linguist
- Sub-discipline: Bilingualism and multilingualism
- Institutions: UiT The Arctic University of Norway
- Website: site.uit.no/maritwestergaard

Marit Kristine Richardsen Westergaard (born 12 August 1956) is a Norwegian linguist, known for her work on child language acquisition and multilingualism.

She defended her PhD thesis The Development of Word Order in Norwegian Child Language: The Interaction of Input and Economy Principles in the Acquisition of V2 at the University of Tromsø in 2005. She was hired as a professor at the University of Tromsø in 2009, and also has held an adjunct professor position at the Norwegian University of Science and Technology since 2015. She has been a fellow of the Norwegian Academy of Science and Letters since 2016.

== Research ==
Much of Westergaard's work has been focused on language acquisition and multilingualism. In her role as AcqVA (Acquisition, Variation, and Attrition) Aurora Center Director, she oversees projects on multilingual acquisition of gender (together with Terje Lohndal) and acquisition and processing of morphosyntax. One of the most prominent areas of Westergaard's expertise is micro-variation and the role of micro-variation in multilingual context. Her work explores the nature of language acquisition as it relates to micro-variation as well as language change.

== The Linguistic Proximity Model of third language acquisition ==
Westergaard proposed an influential model of third language acquisition: the Linguistic Proximity Model (LPM). This model is based on property-by-property acquisition of the target language grammar, and it claims that the acquisition mechanism is based on the typological similarity between the target language property and the previous languages acquired by the language learner. For example, a person who already speaks Russian is likely to transfer the Russian system of gender and the English article system while acquiring German. Westergaard's LPM model is closely related to other partial-transfer models (such as Slabakova's Scalpel Model and Flynn's Cumulative-Enhancement Model) and stands in opposition to wholesale transfer models like Typological Proximity Model. In 2020, Westergaard published a keynote article in SLR, arguing for what she called Full Transfer Potential (FTP), where rather than assuming that 'everything does transfer', she argues that 'anything may transfer'.

== The Micro-cue Model of first language acquisition ==
Westergaard is also the author of the Micro-cue Model of L1 acquisition, arguing that children are sensitive to fine distinctions in syntax and information structure from early on (micro-cues). The model has also been used to account for diachronic change. The model is currently receiving increased attention, resulting in invitations as keynote speaker and contributor to handbooks.

== Cooperation and contributions ==
In cooperation with Antonella Sorace and Bilingualism Matters at the University of Edinburgh, Westergaard runs an advice and information service called Flere språk til flere for bilingual families and the general public, based on current research in the field.

== Honors and awards ==
- Outstanding Research Award 2019, UiT The Arctic University of Norway.
- Member of The Norwegian Academy of Science and Letters, 2016-.
- Member of The Royal Norwegian Society of Science and Letters, 2019-.
- Member of Academia Borealis, Academy of Science and Letters North Norway, 2016-.
- Member of the Executive Committee of IASCL (International Association for the Study of Child Language), 2011-2017.

== Selected bibliography ==
- Rodina, Yulia, Tanja Kupisch, Natalia Meir, Natalia Mitrofanova, Olga Urek & Marit Westergaard. 2020. Internal and External Factors in Heritage Language Acquisition: Evidence from Heritage Russian in Israel, Germany, Norway, Latvia and the UK. Frontiers in Psychology.
- Leivada, Evelina & Marit Westergaard. 2019. Universal linguistic hierarchies are not innately wired: Evidence from multiple adjectives. PeerJ.
- Anderssen, Merete, Björn Lundquist &amp; Marit Westergaard. 2018. Crosslinguistic similarities and differences in bilingual acquisition and attrition. Bilingualism: Language and Cognition 21:4, 748-764.
- Wolleb, Anna, Antonella Sorace & Marit Westergaard. 2018. Exploring the role of cognitive control in syntactic processing: Evidence from cross-language priming in bilingual children. Linguistic Approaches to Bilingualism 8:5, 606-636.
- Rodina, Yulia, and Marit Westergaard. "Grammatical gender in bilingual Norwegian–Russian acquisition: The role of input and transparency." Bilingualism: Language and cognition 20.1 (2017): 197-214.
- Westergaard, Marit, et al. "Crosslinguistic influence in the acquisition of a third language: The Linguistic Proximity Model." International Journal of Bilingualism 21.6 (2017): 666-682.
- Rodina, Yulia & Marit Westergaard. 2012. A cue-based approach to the acquisition of grammatical gender in Russian. Journal of Child Language 39.5, 1077-1106.
- Westergaard, Marit. 2009. The Acquisition of Word Order: Micro-cues, Information Structure and Economy. John Benjamins. (Reviewed in Norsk Lingvistisk Tidsskrift 2009, Journal of Linguistics 2011).
