= Aspect =

Aspect or Aspects may refer to:

== Companies ==
- Aspect Capital, a London-based investment manager
- Aspect Co., a Japanese video game company
- Aspect Software, an American call center technology and customer experience company

== Literature ==
- Aspect (magazine), a biannual DVD magazine showcasing new media art
- Aspects (novel), a fantasy novel by John M. Ford
- Aspects of the Theory of Syntax, a 1965 book by Noam Chomsky

== Music ==
- Aspects (band), a hip hop group from Bristol, England, UK
- Aspects (Benny Carter album), a 1959 album
- Aspects (The Eleventh House album), a 1976 album by Larry Coryell and The Eleventh House
  - "Aspects", the title track of the album

== Other uses ==
- Alain Aspect (born 1947), French physicist and Nobel laureate
- Aspect (computer programming), a feature linked to many parts of a program but not necessarily the primary function of the program
- Aspect (geography), the compass direction that a slope faces
- Aspect (religion), a particular manifestation of a deity
- Astrological aspect, an angle the planets have to each other
- Grammatical aspect, in linguistics, a component of the conjugation of a verb, having to do with the internal temporal flow of an event
- Lexical aspect, in linguistics, a distinction among different kinds of verb according to their relation to time
- Aspect, the orientation of a map projection
- Aspect (trade union), a trade union in the United Kingdom
- Aspect, the visual appearance of a railway signal used to indicate a particular condition or behavior

== See also ==
- Aspect ratio (disambiguation)
- Aspec (disambiguation)
