= Saul Sternberg =

American professor

Saul Sternberg is a professor emeritus of psychology and former Paul C. Williams Term Professor (1993–1998) at the University of Pennsylvania. He is a pioneer in the field of cognitive psychology in the development of experimental techniques to study human information processing. Sternberg received a B.A. in mathematics in 1954 from Swarthmore College and a PhD in social psychology from Harvard University in 1959. He completed a postdoctoral fellowship in mathematical statistics at the University of Cambridge in 1960, and he subsequently worked as a research scientist in the linguistics and artificial intelligence research department at Bell Laboratories, where he continued to work as a member of the technical staff for over twenty years. Sternberg's first academic position was at the University of Pennsylvania, where he was employed from 1961–1964, and where he has remained since 1985. He has also served as a visiting professor at University College, London, the University of California, Berkeley, and Rutgers University. The impact of Sternberg's theoretical and empirical contributions to the field of cognitive psychology have been recognized by many organizations, and he has been elected to fellowship in the American Psychological Association, the Association for Psychological Science, the Society of Experimental Psychologists, the American Association for the Advancement of Science, and the National Academy of Sciences.

== Additive factors method ==
Sternberg is best known for his introduction of the additive factor method. This is a method that uses reaction time measures over a range of tasks in order to identify different cognitive processing stages. The logic of this method has been disputed as of 2011.

== The Sternberg Task ==
In the early 1960s, Sternberg published an original experiment demonstrating the mechanics of cognitive information processing. The experiment entails memorization of a positive set, a list of items such as numbers or words. The subject is then asked about a particular test item that may or may not have actually been present in the set, and is asked to respond "yes" or "no" accordingly. The time taken for the subject to respond is recorded. This process is then repeated over several trials. What Sternberg found was that response time varied with the size of the positive set. In particular, response time tended to increase with the size of the list. This is significant because it demonstrates evidence for what is known today as the Serial Exhaustive Search Theory, which contends that when questioned regarding the presence of an item in a memory set, people will search every item in short-term memory without stopping, even if the item was found.
