= Roumyana Slabakova =

Linguist

- Румяна Слабакова
- Born: Varna, Bulgaria
- Occupations: Professor Emeritus at The University of Iowa, Professor Emeritus at The University of Southampton and Research Professor II at UiT The Arctic University of Norway
- Partner: Zlatko Anguelov Златко Ангелов
- Awards: Foreign member of NASL, RNSSL

Academic background
- Education: BA-MA, Sofia University; PhD, McGill University
- Alma mater: McGill University
- Doctoral advisor: Lydia White

Academic work
- Discipline: language acquisition, formal linguistics
- Sub-discipline: acquisition of semantics
- Institutions: University of Southampton and UiT The Arctic University of Norway
- Notable works: Second Language Acquisition, Telicity in the Second Language
- Notable ideas: The Bottleneck Hypothesis, The Scalpel Model

Roumyana Slabakova is a Bulgaria-born linguist specializing in second language acquisition, third language acquisition, multilingualism, and the syntax–semantics interface. She is Professor Emeritus at the University of Iowa, the University of Southampton and Research Professor II at UiT The Arctic University of Norway. Her research examines how learners acquire grammatical representations and meaning across languages, with particular focus on functional morphology, linguistic interfaces, multilingual representations, and crosslinguistic influence. She is known for the Bottleneck Hypothesis of second language acquisition and the Scalpel Model of third language acquisition.

== Early life and education ==
Slabakova studied English Philology at Sofia University St. Kliment Ohridski in Bulgaria and later completed doctoral studies in linguistics at McGill University, where she worked under the supervision of Lydia White. Within the Universal Grammar framework, her early research examined the acquisition of grammatical meaning in a second language, particularly the relationship between morphology, syntax, and semantic interpretation. She subsequently held academic positions at the University of Iowa before joining the University of Southampton, where she became Chair of Applied Linguistics. She is currently Professor Emeritus at the University of Iowa, the University of Southampton and Research Professor II at UiT The Arctic University of Norway, where she participates in research activities at the Center for Languages, Brain and Learning (C-LaBL). University of Southampton profile ; UiT C-LaBL profile

== Research ==
=== Acquisition of grammatical meaning ===
A major theme of Slabakova's research is the acquisition of meaning in a second language. Her work has investigated how learners acquire the relationship between grammatical form and interpretation, including phenomena such as aspect, tense, telicity, definiteness, genericity, and the syntax–semantics interface.

Her monograph Telicity in the Second Language (2001) examined how second language learners acquire aspectual meaning and the interpretation of verbal predicates. Her later book Meaning in the Second Language (2008) developed a broader account of the acquisition of semantic representations in additional languages. The book received reviews in Studies in Second Language Acquisition, The Modern Language Journal, and The Linguist List. (Ionin, 2010; Call, 2010; McManus, 2009)

Slabakova's research has contributed to approaches that emphasize the importance of meaning and interpretation in understanding second language development, rather than focusing exclusively on surface grammatical forms.

=== Bottleneck Hypothesis ===
Slabakova proposed the Bottleneck Hypothesis, a theory of difficulty in second language acquisition which argues that functional morphology constitutes a major challenge for adult learners because grammatical morphemes encode abstract linguistic features connecting form and meaning. According to the hypothesis, learners may acquire aspects of syntax and semantics while continuing to experience difficulty with morphological systems, as they express fine-grained grammatical distinctions and capture the differences between languages of the world. (Slabakova, 2008; Slabakova, 2013; Slabakova, 2019)

The Bottleneck Hypothesis has been discussed in research on second language acquisition, heritage language acquisition, and multilingualism. Subsequent studies have tested its predictions concerning the relative accessibility of morphology, syntax, and interfaces between linguistic domains. Examples include research on Norwegian learners of English, Chinese learners of English, and heritage speakers of Russian. (Jensen et al., 2019; Wu et al., 2023; Mikhaylova, 2018)

The hypothesis has also been discussed in handbook chapters and reviews addressing formal approaches to second language acquisition and advanced proficiency. (Ionin, 2023; Montrul, 2018; White, 2018)

=== Third language acquisition and the Scalpel Model ===
Slabakova has contributed to research on third language (L3) acquisition and multilingual transfer. She proposed the Scalpel Model, which argues that learners do not transfer a previously learned language as a whole block; instead, they selectively "pick and choose" specific grammatical features from both their first (L1) and second (L2) languages on a property-by-property basis. Factors affecting transfer include structural linguistic complexity, misleading input, construction frequency in the target L3 and prevalent language activation or use, among others.

The model has been discussed in relation to other models of third language acquisition, including the Cumulative Enhancement Model, the L2 Status Factor, and the Typological Primacy Model. (Slabakova, 2017; Cabrelli et al., 2023, Clements and Dominguez 2018)

Research on multilingual transfer has examined predictions associated with property-based transfer, including studies of morphosyntactic transfer, artificial language learning, and longitudinal development. The Scalpel Model has been discussed in textbooks and reference works on multilingual and third language acquisition. (Lago, Mosca, & Stutter Garcia, 2021; Grünke, Pešková & Gabriel, 2024; Luan et al., 2024)

=== Generative second language acquisition ===
Slabakova has contributed to the development and dissemination of generative second-language acquisition through theoretical work, textbooks, and research syntheses. Her textbook Second Language Acquisition (2016), published in the Oxford University Press Core Linguistics series, has been reviewed in Language and other academic publications. (Ionin, 2017; Anastasi, 2017)

She co-authored Generative Second Language Acquisition (2020) with Tania Leal, Amber Dudley, and Micah Stack. The volume provides an overview of generative approaches to second language acquisition and their implications for language learning research. (Slabakova et al., 2020). Addressing future scholars, Slabakova, Leal and Dominguez published Research methods in generative second language acquisition (2025)

=== Recent research ===
Recent research by Slabakova has focused on multilingual linguistic representations and the acquisition of grammar by second-language, third-language and multilingual speakers. Her recent publications include studies of crosslinguistic influence in L3 acquisition of Japanese, interpretation of pronouns in second language Mandarin resultative constructions, and the acquisition of Norwegian genericity by multilingual speakers. ((Slabakova, 2024; Jensen et al., 2023; Slabakova et al., 2024; Velnić, Slabakova & Dahl, 2025))

At UiT – The Arctic University of Norway, she participates in research within the Center for Languages, Brain and Learning, including work on the acquisition of English grammar among Norwegian speakers and heritage language populations. UiT C-LaBL profile

=== Academic recognition and professional service ===
A Festschrift volume, Meaning and Structure in Second Language Acquisition: In Honor of Roumyana Slabakova, was published by John Benjamins in 2018. The volume brought together contributions from scholars working in second language acquisition and related areas. ((Cho et al., 2018))

Slabakova has served in editorial roles in the field of second language acquisition. She was founding co-editor of Linguistic Approaches to Bilingualism (2010–2014) and has served as co-editor of Second Language Research from 2015 onward.

She has been elected a Foreign Member of the Norwegian Academy of Science and Letters and a Foreign Member of the Royal Norwegian Society of Sciences and Letters.

== Selected bibliography ==
- Slabakova, Roumyana. 2001. Telicity in the Second Language. Amsterdam: John Benjamins.
- Slabakova, Roumyana. 2008. Meaning in the Second Language. Berlin: De Gruyter Mouton.
- Slabakova, Roumyana. 2016. Second Language Acquisition. Oxford: Oxford University Press.
- Slabakova, Roumyana et al. 2020. Generative Second Language Acquisition. Cambridge: Cambridge University Press.
- Slabakova, Roumyana. 2024. Multilingual linguistic representations. "Second Language," 22, 25–49. https://doi.org/10.11431/secondlanguage.22.0_25
