= Silvina Montrul =

American linguist

Silvina Montrul is a linguist specializing in generative approaches to second language acquisition. She is Professor of Linguistics and Spanish, Italian and Portuguese, as well as Second Language Acquisition, at the University of Illinois at Urbana–Champaign.

== Career ==
Montrul received her PhD from McGill University in 1998, under the supervision of Lydia White.

Montrul's research has focused on adult second language acquisition of syntax and morphology. She has published books on incomplete acquisition of language and heritage speakers, as well as the acquisition of Spanish. She has been named University Scholar for University of Illinois in 2013, and is co-chief editor of the journal Second Language Research.

In 2025, Montrul was named to the endowed position of "Marjorie Roberts Professor in Liberal Arts & Sciences" at the University of Illinois.

== Selected publications ==
- Montrul, S. (2013) El bilingüismo en el mundo hispanohablante. Malden, MA: Wiley-Blackwell.
- Montrul, S. (2008) Incomplete Acquisition in Bilingualism. Re-examining the Age Factor. Amsterdam: John Benjamins.
- Montrul, S. (2004) The Acquisition of Spanish: Morphosyntactic Development in Monolingual and Bilingual L1 Acquisition and in Adult L2 Acquisition. Amsterdam: John Benjamins.
- Montrul, S. (1998) Transitivity Alternations in Second Language Acquisition: A Crosslinguistic Study of English, Turkish and Spanish. PhD Thesis, McGill University.
