= Aspec =

Aspec or a-spec may refer to:

- Neologism for aromantic and asexual spectra, grouped together under aspec
- A trade name for Aspirin
- A game in the Gran Turismo franchise - Gran Turismo 3: A-Spec

== See also ==
- Aspect (disambiguation)
- Aspic
