= Language production =

Process by which people translate thoughts into spoken, written or signed words

Language production is the production of spoken or written language. In psycholinguistics, it describes all of the stages between having a concept to express and translating that concept into linguistic forms. These stages have been described in two types of processing models: the lexical access models and the serial models. Through these models, psycholinguists can look into how speeches are produced in different ways, such as when the speaker is bilingual. Psycholinguists learn more about these models and different kinds of speech by using language production research methods that include collecting speech errors and elicited production tasks.

== Stages involved ==
Language production consists of several interdependent processes which transform a nonlinguistic message into a spoken, signed, or written linguistic signal. Though the following steps proceed in this approximate order, there are plenty of interaction and communication between them. The process of message planning is an active area of psycholinguistic research, but researchers have found that it is an ongoing process throughout language production. Research suggests that messages are planned in roughly the same order that they are in an utterance. But, there is also evidence that suggests the verbs that give case may be planned earlier than objects, even when the object is said first. After identifying a message, or part of a message, to be linguistically encoded, a speaker must select the individual words—also known as lexical items—to represent that message. This process is called lexical selection. The words are selected based on their meaning, which in linguistics is called semantic information. Lexical selection activates the word's lemma, which contains both semantic and grammatical information about the word.

This grammatical information is then used in the next step of language production, grammatical encoding. Critical grammatical information includes characteristics such as the word's syntactic category (noun, verb, etc.), what objects it takes, and grammatical gender if it is present in the language. Using some of these characteristics as well as information about the thematic roles of each word in the intended message, each word is then assigned the grammatical and thematic role it will have in the sentence. Function morphemes, like the plural /s/ or the past tense /ɪd/, are added in this stage as well. After an utterance, or part of one, has been formed, it then goes through phonological encoding. In this stage of language production, the mental representation of the words to be spoken is transformed into a sequence of speech sounds to be pronounced. The speech sounds are assembled in the order they are to be produced.

The basic loop occurring in the creation of language consists of the following stages:

- Intended message
- Encode message into linguistic form
- Encode linguistic form into speech motor system
- Sound goes from speaker's mouth to hearer's ear auditory system
- Speech is decoded into linguistic form
- Linguistic form is decoded into meaning

According to the lexical access model (see section below), in terms of lexical access, two different stages of cognition are employed; thus, this concept is known as the two-stage theory of lexical access. The first stage, lexical selection provides information about lexical items required to construct the functional level representation. These items are retrieved according to their specific semantic and syntactic properties, but phonological forms are not yet made available at this stage. The second stage, retrieval of wordforms, provides information required for building the positional level representation.

== Models ==
=== Serial model ===
A serial model of language production divides the process into several stages. For example, there may be one stage for determining pronunciation and a stage for determining lexical content. The serial model does not allow overlap of these stages, so they may only be completed one at a time.

=== Connectionist model ===
Several researchers have proposed a connectionist model, one notable example being Dell. According to his connectionist model, there are four layers of processing and understanding: semantic, syntactic, morphological, and phonological. These work in parallel and in series, with activation at each level. Interference and misactivation can occur at any of these stages. Production begins with concepts, and continues down from there. One might start with the concept of a cat: a four-legged, furry, domesticated mammal with whiskers, etc. This conceptual set would attempt to find the corresponding word {cat}. This selected word would then select morphological and phonological data /k / at/. The distinction of this model is that, during this process, other elements would also be primed ({rat} might be somewhat primed, for example), as they are physically similar, and so can cause conceptual interference. Errors might also occur at the phoneme level, as many words are phonetically similar, e.g. mat. Substitutions of similar consonant sounds are more likely to occur, e.g. between plosive stop consonants such as d, p and b. Lower primed words are less likely to be chosen, but interference is thought to occur in cases of early selection, where the level of activation of the target and interference words is at the same level.

=== Lexical access model ===
This model states that the sentence is made by a sequence of processes generating differing levels of representations. For instance, the functional level representation is made on the preverbal representation, which is essentially what the speaker seeks to express. This level is responsible for encoding the meanings of lexical items and the way that grammar forms relationships between them. Next, the positional level representation is built, which functions to encode the phonological forms of words and the order they are found in sentence structures. Lexical access, according to this model, is a process that encompasses two serially ordered and independent stages.

== Additional aspects ==
=== Fluency ===
Fluency can be defined in part by prosody, which is shown graphically by a smooth intonation contour, and by a number of other elements: control of speech rate, relative timing of stressed and unstressed syllables, changes in amplitude, changes in fundamental frequency. In other words, fluency can be described as whether someone speaks smoothly and easily. This term is used in speech-language pathology when describing disorders with stuttering or other disfluencies.

=== Multilingualism ===
Whether or not a speaker is fluent in one or more languages, the process for producing language remains the same. However, bilinguals speaking two languages within a conversation may have access to both languages at the same time. Three of the most commonly discussed models for multilingual language access are the Bilingual Interactive Activation Plus model, the Revised Hierarchical Model, and the Language Mode model:

- Bilingual Interactive Activation Plus, updated from a model made by Dijkstra and Van Heuven, uses solely bottom-up processing to facilitate bilingual language access. This model suggests that the lexicon for bilingual speakers combines the languages, and access occurs across both languages at the same time.
- Revised Hierarchical Model, developed by Kroll and Stewart, is a model suggesting that bilingual brains store meanings in a common place, word-forms are separated by language.
- Language Mode Model, made by Grosjean, uses two assumptions to map bilingual language production in a modular way. These assumptions are that a base language is activated in conversation, and that the speaker's other language is activated to relative degrees depending on context. De Bot describes it as overly simple for the complexity of the process and suggests it has room for expansion.

Speakers fluent in multiple languages may inhibit access to one of their languages, but this suppression can only be done once the speaker is at a certain level of proficiency in that language. A speaker can decide to inhibit a language based on non-linguistic cues in their conversation, such as a speaker of both English and French inhibiting their French when conversing with people who only speak English. When especially proficient multilingual speakers communicate, they can participate in code-switching. Code-switching has been shown to indicate bilingual proficiency in a speaker, though it had previously been seen as a sign of poor language ability.

== Research methods ==
There are three main types of research into language production: speech error collection, picture-naming, and elicited production. Speech error collection focuses on using the analysis of speech errors made in naturally produced speech. On the other hand, elicited production focuses on elicited speech and is conducted in a lab. Also conducted in a lab, picture-naming focuses on reaction-time data from picture-naming latencies. Although originally disparate, these three methodologies are generally looking at the same underlying processes of speech production.

=== Speech errors ===
Speech errors have been found to be common in naturally produced speech. Analysis of speech errors has found that not all are random, but rather systematic and fall into several categories. These speech errors can demonstrate parts of the language processing system, and what happens when that system doesn't work as it should. Language production occurs quickly with speakers saying a little more than 2 words per second; so though errors occur only once out of 1,000 words, they occur relatively often throughout a speaker's day at once every 7 minutes. Some examples of these speech errors that would be collected by psycholinguists are:

- Anticipation: The word adds a sound from a word planned for later in the utterance.

target: paddle tennis
produced: taddle tennis

- Preservation: The word retains characteristics of a word said previously in an utterance.

target: red wagon
produced: red ragon

- Blending: More than one word is being considered in the lexicon and the two intended items "blend" into a single item.

target: shout/yell
produced: shell

- Addition: Additional of linguistics material added to the word.

target: impossible
produced: implossible

- Substitution: A whole word of related meaning is replacing another.

target: at low speed it's too heavy
produced: at low speed it's too light

- Malapropism: A lay term, in reference to a character Mrs. Malaprop from Sheridan's The Rivals, referring to the incorrect substitution of words.

Makes no delusions to the past.
The pineapple of perfection.
I have interceded another letter from the fellow.

- Spoonerism: The switching of the letters from two words in the utterance.

target: slips of the tongue
produced: tips of the slung

=== Picture-naming ===
Picture-naming tasks ask participants to look at pictures and name them in a certain way. By looking at the time course for the responses in these tasks, psycholinguists can learn more about the planning involved in specific phrases. These types of tasks can be helpful for investigating cross-linguistic language production and planning processes.

=== Elicited Production ===
Elicited production tasks ask participants to respond to questions or prompts in a particular way. One of the more common types of elicited production tasks is the sentence completion task. These tasks give the participants the beginning of a target sentence, which the participants are then asked to complete. Analyzing these completions can allow psycholinguistics to investigate errors that might be difficult to elicit otherwise.

== Working memory involvement in language production ==
=== Working memory components ===
Working memory is essential for language production, consisting of three primary components: verbal, visual, and spatial. Each component serves a distinct function in processing and integrating information. Verbal working memory is central to managing phonological information, such as words and sentences, and is heavily involved in organizing syntax and lexical retrieval. Visual working memory supports the retention and manipulation of visual imagery, playing a significant role in tasks like planning written material or imagining spatial layouts. Spatial working memory contributes to the organization and sequencing of ideas, ensuring coherence and logical progression. These components often work in tandem, drawing on specialized neural networks to enable effective language production across various contexts.

=== Abstract versus concrete language ===
The nature of the language being produced—abstract or concrete—affects the engagement of verbal, visual, and spatial working memory components. Abstract language, such as metaphors or theoretical concepts, places a greater demand on verbal working memory due to the need to synthesize non-physical, conceptual relationships. It relies less on visual working memory because abstract concepts are not directly imageable. Conversely, concrete language, which describes tangible and sensory-based ideas, activates both verbal and visual working memory. Concrete ideas often enhance recall and comprehension by drawing on mental imagery, directly linking verbal and visual systems. For example, writing about familiar, imageable nouns engages visual working memory more intensively, while abstract nouns rely almost exclusively on verbal working memory. Different types of language production selectively recruit specific components of working memory.

=== Simple versus complex tasks ===
The complexity of the task directly influences working memory demands. Simple tasks like writing single words are less taxing, as they require minimal linguistic planning and retrieval. However, producing complex sentences or multi-layered narratives involves greater cognitive load, engaging verbal and visual working memory for planning, syntactic integration, and coherence. Studies show that writing complex sentences can compromise fluency and coherence, as increased working memory demands make balancing retention and structure more difficult. These findings emphasize that writing is a layered cognitive process, with cognitive load increasing alongside linguistic complexity.

=== Written versus oral language production ===
Written language production is more cognitively demanding than oral production. Writing requires sustained attention, planning, encoding, and motor execution, all of which significantly tax verbal working memory. Maintaining phonological representations while managing the slower output of writing intensifies working memory load compared to the transient nature of speech. In contrast, oral production benefits from immediate feedback and conversational context, which reduce cognitive load and allow for more automatic language processing. Distinction in production processes illustrate that written and spoken language utilize overlapping but distinct cognitive resources.

=== Emotional States ===
Affect, or emotional state, plays a crucial role in language production, interacting with working memory resources to shape performance. Positive emotions enhance cognitive flexibility, aiding in idea generation and linguistic creativity. Conversely, negative emotions, such as anxiety, reduce working memory capacity and disrupt fluency, particularly during complex tasks. Studies show that affect impacts not only fluency and coherence but also the tone and approach to writing, emphasizing the interconnectedness of cognitive and emotional processes in language production.

== See also ==
- Developmental verbal dyspraxia
- FOXP2
- Langue and parole
- Speech-language pathology
