= Syntax (journal) =

- Discipline: Syntax
- Language: English
- Edited by: Acrisio Pires, Vera Lee-Schoenfeld, and Dan Parker

Publication details
- History: 1998–present
- Publisher: Wiley-Blackwell
- Frequency: Quarterly
- Impact factor: 1.0 (2013)

Standard abbreviations
- ISO 4: Syntax

Indexing
- ISSN: 1368-0005 (print); 1467-9612 (web)

Links
- Journal homepage; Online access

Syntax is a peer-reviewed academic journal in the field of syntax of natural languages, established in 1998 and published by Wiley-Blackwell. The founding editors were Suzanne Flynn (MIT) and Samuel D. Epstein (University of Michigan). Syntax was rated A in both the Australian Research Council's ERA journal list for 2010 and the European Science Foundation's linguistics journal list.

On 9 March 2024, editors Klaus Abels and Suzanne Flynn announced their resignation in protest of Wiley-Blackwell's publication practices. In an open letter to the linguistics community, they asserted that Wiley-Blackwell had failed to provide the quality of copyediting and publication that would be necessary to justify the unpaid work provided by authors, peer reviewers, and editors. The former editors announced their intent to start a new diamond open access journal to replace the original, titled Syntactic Theory and Research.

Following the resignation of the former editors, Acrisio Pires, Dan Parker, and Vera Lee-Schoenfeld were appointed in 2026 as the journal's editors by Wiley. Under the new editorial team, Syntax continues to publish peer-reviewed research in theoretical syntax, comparative grammar, and the interfaces between syntax and related fields, including semantics, morphology, phonology, and psycholinguistics.
