= Bonnie Schwartz =

Experimental linguist

Bonnie D. Schwartz is an experimental linguist, specializing in generative approaches to second language acquisition. She is currently a professor in the Department of Second Language Studies at the University of Hawaii.

Schwartz received her PhD in 1987 from the University of Southern California, supervised by Stephen Krashen.

Schwartz's work has focused on the nature of second language acquisition, arguing for full transfer of the first language grammar as the initial state of the second language grammar. More recently, her work has come to focus on child second language acquisition, and how it may differ from that of adults. She co-founded two conferences, Generative Approaches to Language Acquisition (GALA), and its North American counterpart (GALANA).

== Key publications ==
- (2007) Schwartz, B.D. "The L2 child as arbitrator." Studies in Language Sciences 6: 3-30.
- (1998) Schwartz, B.D. "The second language instinct." Lingua 106:133-60.
- (1996) Schwartz, B.D. & R.A. Sprouse. "L2 cognitive states and the Full Transfer/Full Access model." Second Language Research 12.1: 40–72.
