= Bilingual lexicon =

With the amount of bilinguals increasing worldwide, psycholinguists have begun to look at how the brain represents multiple languages. The mental lexicon is a focus of research on differences between monolingual and multilingual brains.

Research during past decades shows that bilingual brains have special neural connections, and whether they constitute a distinct bilingual brain structure is still being studied. The mode of basic lexical representations of bilingualism has also been debated.

== Development ==
=== Lexical development ===
Lexical development does not occur in isolation. Children learn pronunciation, meanings and usage of words by interacting with their parents and environment (i.e. social interactions), and through media like television, the Internet and social media. The process moves from using words in particular situations to the understanding that words can be used to refer to different instances of conceptual categories, like objects, or that action words can be used in similar situations. Later, children increase their vocabulary in categories like colour, animals, or food, and learn to add prefixes and suffixes to words, thereby expanding their meaning. Once children enter school, they apply and develop words into reading and written aspects. Knowledge will be developed through reading and exposure to various written contexts.

=== Lexical development in bilingual children ===
Bilingual children's language development throughout childhood influences the lexical size of both languages. Researchers have shown that the basic process of learning is the same as that of monolinguals, and bilingual children tend to learn languages like two monolinguals. The growth of bilingual lexicons is the same as that of monolinguals. Older children tend to show greater cross-linguistic influence (or transfer of L1 knowledge) from their first language more than younger children. In this method of learning words, the vocabulary size is related to the time of exposure in that language. This will continue until a certain amount of vocabulary in that language is reached. Semantic tasks for preschool children with predominantly Spanish-speaking, English-speaking and balanced bilingual backgrounds showed that they are different from each other. Bilinguals perform best on expressive functions for both Spanish and English as well as predominantly-speaking children, but they performed differently in each language, meaning that they do not mirror equal performance in Spanish and English. One group performed better in English while another performed better in Spanish. The ability to learn one language does not influence the ability to learn the other for bilinguals.

Lexical development in children who learn their second language when their first language is already developed is different from that of children who grew up in a bilingual environment (i.e. simultaneous bilingualism). The first step of learning words in the second language is translation, or learning the definitions of those words. This is different from how they learned their first language, which involves taking information input from semantic and formal entities. When accessing these newly learned words, the basic language semantic system will be activated, which means that when a word in a second language is activated, the word in the dominant first language with the same meaning is also activated. Researchers say that learners are still thinking in their first language but try to represent their thought process in the second language through translation. As more semantic and syntactic knowledge for the second language is acquired, this new language gradually becomes independent from the first language. Learners begin to access the language without translation using the semantic knowledge for that language. As learners gain more and more exposure to the new language, they will complete the development of the second language when they can access and use the language from the concept, which can be said to be thinking in that language directly.

== Process and access ==
With years of research, the process of storing language in bilinguals is still a main issue that concerns many psycholinguists. In one instance, bilinguals possess one or two internal lexicons, and even more with three stores—one for each language—and the third one is used for the corresponding two languages. The reaction time of recognizing words in different languages is the most used method of understanding how the bilingual lexicon is activated. In the 1980s, Soares and Grosjean had two main findings for English–Portuguese bilinguals: one is that although bilinguals can access words in English as quickly as monolinguals, they are slower at responding to non-words. The other finding is that bilinguals took longer to access code-switched words than they did with first-language words in the monolingual mode. These two findings can be seen as evidence that more than one lexical system existed in bilinguals' brains. As technology develops, functional magnetic resonance imaging (fMRI) is used to study how brain activity is different in bilinguals' brains when both languages are interacting. Imaging studies have yielded that specific brain areas are involved in bilingual switching, meaning that one part of the brain can be classified as the "third lexicon"—the interconnected part of two lexicons for each language—where the brain stores foreign words. Other research papers suggest only one combined lexicon exists.

== See also ==
- Language acquisition
