= Interface hypothesis =

Concept in adult second-language acquisition

The interface hypothesis in adult second language acquisition is an attempt to explain non-target-like linguistic behavior that persists even among highly advanced speakers. The hypothesis was first put forward by Antonella Sorace.

The hypothesis posits that for adult second language learners, acquiring grammatical properties within a given linguistic area, such as phonology, syntax, or semantics, should not be problematic. Interfacing between those modules, such as communicating between the syntax and semantic systems, should likewise be feasible. However, grammatical operations where the speaker is required to interface between an internal component of the grammar, and an external component, such as pragmatics or discourse information, will prove to be very difficult, and will not be acquired completely by the second language learner, even at very advanced levels.

Examples of phenomena argued to be influenced by the interface hypothesis include use of overt vs. null subjects, as well as use of subject placement before or after the verb to mark focus vs. using prosody, in languages like Italian by native English speakers.
