= Aspect ratio (disambiguation) =

The aspect ratio of a geometric shape is the ratio of its sizes in different dimensions.

Aspect ratio may also refer to:

- Aspect ratio (aeronautics), the ratio of a wing's span to its mean chord
- Aspect ratio (image), the ratio of an image's width to its height
- Display aspect ratio, the ratio of a computer monitor's width to its height
- Pixel aspect ratio, the ratio ratio of a pixel's width to its height in a digital image
- Automotive engine aspect ratio, controlled by variable-geometry turbochargers
