= Aspect (magazine) =

Defunct American DVD magazine

ASPECT Volume 9: Performance

ASPECT was a biannual DVD magazine showcasing new media art. The magazine was headquartered in Boston, Mass. It ended publication with the issue 21 in 2013.

ASPECT was notable for being one of the first DVD-based chronicles of time-based media. ASPECT’s DVD format offered artists using installation art, performance art, animation, sound, and visual techniques a way for their work to be recorded and distributed to the greater art community. Each submission had an audio commentary by an expert in the field, and each issue is identified by a common theme.

The publication was used largely as an educational tool, but was also available for subscriptions and for purchase in art museums like the Museum of Modern Art and The New Museum. ASPECT provided those working in new media art with access to their contemporaries’ work and grants them a critical take on the work to help contextualize it within the larger art world.

Since its founding in 2003, ASPECT published several volumes, each one featuring 5-10 artists and addressing a specific theme. Past themes included: "Artists of the Boston Cyberarts Festival", "Artists of the West Coast", "The Artist as Content", "Text and Language", "Joie de Vivre", "On Location", "Personas and Personalities", "Rural", "Early Works", and "Performance".

In addition to the biannual magazine, ASPECT occasionally created and distributed other DVDs of a single artist's work, which lend outside of the periodical format. Past features include monographs of Douglas Weathersby's "Environmental Services: Projects for TV" and "The Art and Films of Lynn Hershman Leeson."

In October 2006 ASPECT released The Tipping Point, a documentary of a large-scale collaboration that chronicles the lives of four artists living in South Boston as they create an interdisciplinary interactive artwork based on their own health narratives.

== History ==
ASPECT was founded in 2003 by artist and educator Michael Mittelman. The mission of the publication was to distribute and archive works of time-based art. Each issue highlighted artists working in new or experimental media, whose works are best documented in video or sound. ASPECT began when Mittelman was frustrated with the lack of teaching materials available in the field of Interrelated Media. After meeting with leading curators such as George Fifield, director of the Boston Cyberarts Festival, and Bill Arning, curator at the List Visual Arts Center, led Michael to the conclusion that curators and artists would gladly participate in a DVD publication of their work, and Volume 1: Artists of the Boston Cyberarts Festival was born. Rooted in its mission of distributing and archiving art that was best documented in video and/or sound, ASPECT became one of the most well-established and respected DVD magazine in its field, having featured over 50 works and artists in its four-year history.

In November 2006 ASPECT was honored by the Photographic Resource Center in Boston, MA as part of an exhibition celebrating their 30th anniversary. It ceased publication in April 2013.
