= Aspect Capital =

Investment management company based in London

- Industry: Investment management
- Headquarters: London, England
- Key people: Anthony Todd (CEO), Martin Lueck (Research Director)
- AUM: US$ 7.1 billion (as of June 30, 2019)
- Number of employees: 128 as of September 2016
- Website: www.aspectcapital.com

Aspect Capital is a London-based investment manager that applies a systematic and quantitative approach to investment management. According to the Financial Times, Aspect uses "technology and complex mathematical models to power computers that trade the world's markets around the clock". Aspect manages USD6.6bn.

Aspect has approximately 128 employees.

The name and logo of the company derive from one of the founders’ passion for gliding and the aspect ratio of wing design: the wider the wing span, the more stable the plane.

== History ==
Aspect was established in 1997 by Anthony Todd, Martin Lueck, Michael Adam and Eugene Lambert. Two of Aspect's founders, Michael Adam and Martin Lueck, were co-founders of Adam, Harding & Lueck (AHL, now a part of the Man Group Plc), one of the earliest managed futures firms in Europe, with Anthony Todd and Eugene Lambert also working at AHL prior to founding Aspect. Aspect was set up with seed capital, the majority of which was provided by the fund of funds manager, RMF. Aspect started trading the Aspect Diversified Programme in 1998 with $22m of assets under management. Aspect opened sales offices in the US in 2004 and in Hong Kong in 2008

== Investment approach ==
Aspect offers a range of systematic investment strategies. The longest-running strategy is the Aspect Diversified Programme. The programme, which runs the majority of Aspect's assets under management, uses a medium-term trend following strategy which is designed to systematically and quantitatively identify and exploit trends in a broad range of highly liquid futures and foreign exchange markets to generate diversifying returns for investors. The Aspect Diversified Programme's investment philosophy is based on the premise that trends are a persistent feature of markets. Aspect's tagline: “The Science of Investment” emphasises the firm's philosophy of applying a scientific approach to investment management. Aspect Diversified’s track record goes back to December 1998

== Registrations ==
In the UK, Aspect Capital Limited (Aspect) is authorised and regulated by the Financial Conduct Authority. In the USA, Aspect has been registered as a Commodity Trading Advisor with the Commodity Futures Trading Commission (CFTC) since October 1999. In addition, Aspect has been registered as an SEC Investment Advisor with the Securities and Exchange Commission (SEC) since October 2003 and has been a member of the National Futures Association (NFA) since October 1999. In Hong Kong, Aspect Capital Asia Limited has been licensed and regulated by the Securities and Futures Commission (SFC) since June 2008.

Aspect has been a signatory of the Hedge Fund Standard Board (HFSB) since 2010
