= Suzanne Flynn =

American linguist

- Born: Cambridge, MA, USA
- Occupations: Professor, Department of Linguistics and Philosophy, MIT; Speech-Language Pathologist, BCH
- Known for: Cumulative-enhancement model of third language acquisition, anaphora in SLA
- Title: Professor of Foreign Languages and Linguistics
- Awards: fellow of AAAS

Academic background
- Education: BA, University of Massachusetts-Boston; MS, University of Puerto Rico; PhD, Cornell University
- Alma mater: Cornell University
- Thesis: A Study of the Effects of Principal Branching Direction in Second Language Acquisition: The Generalization of a Parameter of Universal Grammar from First to Second Language Acquisition (1984)
- Influences: Noam Chomsky, Samuel Epstein, Barbara Lust

Academic work
- Discipline: language acquisitionist, linguist
- Sub-discipline: Bilingualism and multilingualism
- Institutions: Massachusetts Institute of Technology (MIT)

Suzanne Flynn (June 30, 1950- ) is an American linguist and Professor of Linguistics at MIT who has contributed to the fields of second and third language acquisition. She has also investigated language disorders.

== Research ==
Suzanne Flynn received her PhD from Cornell University in 1983. Her work has spanned from syntax and second-language acquisition of syntax to language processing in people with neurocognitive disorders, such as changes in language during the prodromal course in the development of Alzheimer's disease.

=== Early work ===
In 1987, Flynn published a book which explored second-language acquisition (SLA) of anaphora and offered a parametric model for acquisition of this property. In line with the reorganization of the linguistic field at that point, the book considered characterization of Universal Grammar (UG) as a set of subtheories, each with its set of central principles and parameters according to which a principle can vary between an unmarked ('-') and a marked ('+') parametric value. At the same time, Flynn was one of the key SLA specialists to start the GASLA (Generative Approaches to Second-Language Acquisition) conference.

In 1996, Flynn, along with S.D. Epstein and Gita Martohardjono published a seminal paper evaluating key debates in the SLA field at the time. One of the most important questions was to what extent, if any, Universal Grammar constrains second language acquisition? At the moment, three hypotheses of SLA were articulated. The first one was the “no access” hypothesis that claims that no aspect of UG is available to the L2 learner. The second is the “partial access” hypothesis that claims that only LI instantiated principles and LI instantiated parameter-values of UG are available to the learner. The third, called the “full access” hypothesis, asserts that UG in its entirety constrains L2 acquisition. Flynn and co-authors argued for the "full access" hypothesis which remains a valid theory today and guides much of modern research.

From the early days of her work in SLA, Flynn has been a staunch proponent of principled approach to explaining processes which language acquisition involves. As such, she strongly advocates for strictly linguistic accounts of language acquisition within Chomskian tradition which are grounded in Minimalist Program and stem from our understanding of syntactic theory.

=== Third language acquisition ===
In line with Flynn's earlier work on accessibility of the UG, she co-authored one of the first models of third language acquisition: The Cumulative-Enhancement Model (CEM). The model argued that language learning is cumulative and all previous languages (i.e., the native language and the second language) can facilitate language learning. The model, notably, does not claim that previous languages exert an exclusively facilitative effect. On the contrary, the model allows for more than occasional interferences from previous languages while claiming that the acquisition process per se cannot be characterized through a deficit model or alike. The model has also been pointed out to be easily extendable to fourth language acquisition and beyond, which is not a feature most of the current models for L3 acquisition share. The CEM model stands in opposition to the so-called "wholesale" models of L3 acquisition (e.g. Typological Primacy Model or L2 Status).

== Honors and distinctions ==
Flynn is co-founding editor (with Samuel D. Epstein) of the peer-reviewed journal Syntax.

Flynn was elected to the American Association for the Advancement of Science (AAAS) in 2019. Linguistic Society of America described her as "a leading researcher on syntax acquisition of children and adults in bilingual, second, and third language contexts".

== Selected bibliography ==
- Flynn, Suzanne. A parameter-setting model of L2 acquisition: Experimental studies in anaphora. Vol. 5. Springer Science & Business Media, 2012.
- Flynn, Suzanne, and Wayne O'Neil, eds. Linguistic theory in second language acquisition. Vol. 8. Springer Science & Business Media, 2012.
- Flynn, Suzanne, and Gita Martohardjono. "Mapping from the initial state to the final state: The separation of universal principles and language-specific properties." (1992).
- Yow, W. Quin, Jessica SH Tan, and Suzanne Flynn. "Code-switching as a marker of linguistic competence in bilingual children." Bilingualism: Language and Cognition 21.5 (2018): 1075–1090.
- Cabrelli-Amaro, Jennifer, Suzanne Flynn, and Jason Rothman. "Third language acquisition in adulthood." (2012).
- Lust, Barbara, Yu-chin Chien, and Suzanne Flynn. "What children know: Methods for the study of first language acquisition." Studies in the acquisition of anaphora. Springer, Dordrecht, 1987. 271–356.
- Szarkowski, Amy, Suzanne Flynn, and Terrell Clark. "Dually diagnosed: A retrospective study of the process of diagnosing autism spectrum disorders in children who are deaf and hard of hearing." Seminars in Speech and Language. Vol. 35. No. 04. Thieme Medical Publishers, 2014.
