= Lydia White =

Canadian linguist

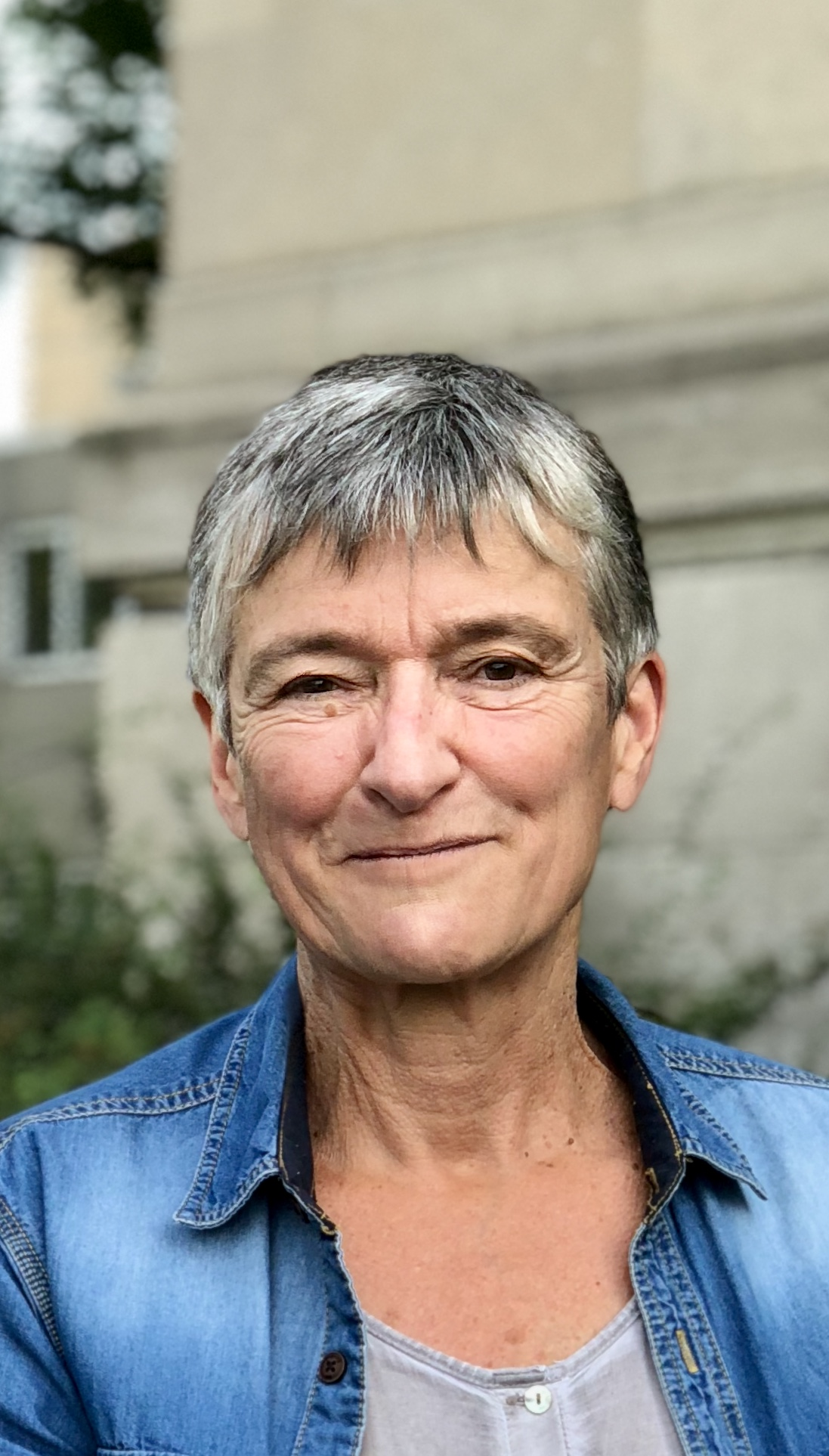
Lydia White in Montreal, Canada (2018)

Lydia White (born 1946) is a Canadian linguist and educator in the area of second language acquisition (SLA). She is James McGill Professor Emeritus of Linguistics at McGill University.

== Biography ==
She received her BA in Moral Sciences and Psychology from Cambridge University in 1969 and PhD in linguistics from McGill University in 1980.

Her PhD dissertation, published in book form as Grammatical Theory and Language Acquisition, concerns the theoretical problem of first language acquisition from the perspective of generative grammar. Her 1989 survey of SLA research, Universal Grammar and Second Language Acquisition, has become a standard textbook in many university level SLA courses. The book puts particular emphasis on research which explores the implications that the theory of linguistic universals (the Universal Grammar theory) has had upon second language acquisition approaches. In 2003, Lydia White published the book Second Language Acquisition and Universal Grammar, which extends the claims that the process of second language acquisition is guided and constrained by Universal Grammar.

== Honors and distinctions ==
In 2010 she was elected as a Fellow of the Royal Society of Canada in the Academy of Arts and Humanities. In 2012, she received the Queen Elizabeth II Diamond Jubilee Medal.

She currently serves on the editorial boards of the journals Language Acquisition, Linguistic Approaches to Bilingualism, and Second Language Research. Together with Roumyana Slabakova, she is also co-editor of the book series Language Acquisition and Language Disorders.

A Festschrift in her honor, Inquiries in Linguistic Development, was published in 2006.

== Selected publications ==
=== Books ===
- "Grammatical Theory and Language Acquisition", 1982, Dordrecht: Foris
- "Universal Grammar and Second Language Acquisition", 1989, Amsterdam: John Benjamins
- "Second Language Acquisition and Universal Grammar", 2003, New York: Cambridge University Press

=== Articles ===
Lydia White has edited special issues of several leading journals in the field, and authored many articles in Language Learning, Studies in Second Language Acquisition, Second Language Research, and Language Acquisition. Some notable examples include the following:

- Prévost, Philippe and Lydia White. 2000. "Missing surface inflection or impairment in second language acquisition? Evidence from tense and agreement." Second Language Research 16: 103-133.
- White, Lydia. 1991. "Adverb placement in second language acquisition: Some effects of positive and negative evidence in the classroom." Second Language Research 7: 133-161.
- White, Lydia. 1985. "The "pro-drop" parameter in adult second language learning." Language Learning 35: 47-62.

== Sources ==
McGill University. James McGill / William Dawson Programme. McGill University, Associate Provost (Planning and Budgets). Retrieved on April 19, 2009
