= Serial memory processing =

Processing one memory at a time

Serial memory processing is the act of attending to and processing one item at a time. This is usually contrasted against parallel memory processing, which is the act of attending to and processing all items simultaneously.

In short-term memory tasks, participants are given a set of items (e.g. letters, digits) one at a time and then, after varying periods of delay, are asked for recall of the items. As well, participants could be asked whether a specific target item was present in their original set. The serial order of items and the relationships between them can have varying effects on the item's speed and accuracy of recall.

== Overview ==
Serial memory processing uses internal representations of the memory set in order to compare them to a target stimulus or item that is being presented. These internal representations are then compared to the target stimulus, one at a time. Reaction time increases linearly with the set size, where the more items in the memory set, the longer it will take to compare.

Self-Terminating Search

Exhaustive Search

Hypothetical slopes for positive and negative trials

Serial memory processing can be either self-terminating or exhaustive. Self-terminating implies that comparisons stop abruptly as soon as the target is found, and then the response is generated. Evidence for this method is found in reaction time studies. If the reaction time slope for a positive trial (where the target was present in the memory set) is about half of the slope for a negative trial (where the target was not present in the memory set) this demonstrates self-terminating processing. This is because, on average, participants (on positive trials) will stop comparisons about halfway through when they find the target match but participants (on negative trials) will need to compare until the end when no target match is found. On the other hand, exhaustive implies that comparisons continue until the entire set is compared and then a response is generated. Evidence for this method is also found in reaction time studies. In this case, the reaction time slope is equal for both positive and negative trials, as comparisons are made to the end in both cases. Participants may process some serial memory sets using the self-terminating method and in other cases use the exhaustive method, there is no clear distinction between which method is better to use.

== Characteristics of processing ==
Primacy and recency effects

In serial memory processing, Primacy effect and recency effect effects for accuracy of recall are commonly found. These effects are found for both visual and auditory stimuli in memory tasks. This means that of the many items in a memory set during serial memory processing, the first item and the last seem to be recalled faster and more accurately than the other items. These effects may exist if recall errors are due to serial position. It is theorized that items are mistaken for other items from a nearby position in the memory set (e.g. the 5th item is mistaken for the 4th item or the 6th item). Since there are more nearby serial positions to middle items in a set, there are therefore more opportunities for mixing-up items. On the other hand, there are very few serial positions nearby to the first and last position, and therefore these positions may be remembered more accurately (or mistaken less). The first and last position may be less error-prone positions and more easily recalled.

This graph, recreated from Nairne (1992), demonstrates the primacy and recency effects for recall of serial order. These effects are consistent regardless of memory set length.

The suffix effect is an effect that removes the recency effect by adding in a meaningless item at the end of the original memory set. The belief is that this meaningless item will be remembered instead of the second-to-last item which was originally remembered due to the recency effect. However, the suffix effect varies based on the similarity of the item to the set. For visual stimuli, adding in the meaningless item, whether or not it is visually similar to the original memory set, will remove the recency effect. For auditory stimuli, adding in the meaningless item will only remove the recency effect if it is phonologically similar. Adding an item that is phonologically different (e.g. A, Q) will not have this effect.

Stimuli grouping effects

Items in a serial memory can be presented in ways that promote grouping amongst the items. Individuals can group a set of items spatially and temporally based on their characteristics of presentation.

Spatial grouping refers to the items in the original memory set being grouped by their spatial characteristics. An example of this would be presenting the first three items in the top right corner, and the remaining three items in the bottom left corner. These items are now grouped into two groups of three based on their spatial attributes. It has been found that the longer the spatial pathways from item to item, the slower the recall time and the lower the accuracy of recall. Therefore, item's that have a small spatial pathway between them, are remembered better and faster. In this case, the fourth item would be remembered less easily, because the spatial pathway from the top right corner (where the third item was) to the bottom left corner (where the fourth item will be) is longer than most.

Temporal grouping refers to the items in the original memory set being grouped by their temporal characteristics. An example of this would be presenting the first three items simultaneously, then waiting five seconds, and then presenting the remaining three items. These items are now grouped into two groups of three based on their temporal attributes. It has been found that when item's are grouped temporally, the accuracy of recall is higher than when they are not. As well, there is evidence that participants may create their own temporal groupings. In a memory task where items were not temporally grouped, the reaction times of recall for the 1st, 4th and 7th (out of 9) items were significantly faster. This finding shows evidence that participants may be creating their own temporal group of three, since the first item of each group (the 1st, 4th and 7th) are recalled faster than the rest of the items in their "group".

Other errors

There are other errors that exist in serial memory tasks based on the item's characteristics. Serial position errors have been discussed earlier, in relation to the primacy and recency effect. These errors have been found to be independent from other errors, such as acoustic errors. Acoustic errors result from items that are phonologically similar. An example of this would be recalling "B" as opposed to the actual item "P". These items are phonologically similar and can cause acoustic errors. These are related to the suffix effect as well, which found that the rececny effect was only removed when phonologically similar stimuli were used. As well, other variables of verbal stimuli have been found to cause acoustic errors. Examples of these variables are word length, word frequency and lexicality. These interact to cause acoustic errors in serial memory tasks by adding in acoustic confusability amongst the items.

Processing in atypical individuals

It has been found that when mental age is equated, there is no difference in performance on serial memory tasks for children with autism. This is an important finding as serial memory processing is a cognitive ability that may not be related to other cognitive abilities that are hindered by autism spectrum disorders.

Neuro-perspective

Serial memory processing has been studied neurologically, and certain brain regions have been found to be associated to this processing. There is evidence that both the prefrontal cortex and the hippocampal region are related to serial memory processing. This is because lesions in these areas tend to be related to impaired ability in remembering serial order. These brain regions can have impairments on memory for temporal order. Lesions on the medial prefrontal cortex shows total memory loss for the temporal order of spatial locations (this was tested by ability on a maze task). On the other hand, lesions in the hippocampal regions showed delayed memory loss. The participants remembered for a short time the temporal order of spatial locations; those memory declined thereafter. Rat studies have shown that lesions in the prefrontal cortex cause an inability to remember the 2nd of two items in a set. As well, the rats showed increased corticosterone while experiencing stress during a serial memory task. On the other hand, rat studies have also shown that lesions in the hippocampal regions cause an inability to remember the 1st of two items. Furthermore, these rats do not show an increase in their corticosterone while experiencing stress, demonstrating differing effects for differing brain regions. As well it shows that the different brain regions differentially activate corticosterone, a hormone related to memory effects.

Generally, it has been found that the left hemisphere is better at serial processing and serial memory comparisons than the right hemisphere. These processes may be more related to the lateralization of left hemispheric functions rather than right hemispheric ones.

== Associated models ==
One popular model that has been used to organize serial memory processing is the ACT-R. ACT-R model is Adaptive Control of Thought-Rational. This cognitive architecture has been used to help hierarchically organize serial memory. This model separates declarative memory and production memory into separate functions. During serial memory processing, declarative memory works to encode the physical positions of the items in the original memory set. As well, the production memory works to help organize the later recall of the items in the memory set. The ACT-R is a limited-capacity model meaning that there is a limited amount of activation available to use for processing. This limited-capacity helps to explain the linear relationship between time of recall and size of memory set. According to the ACT-R, the longer the original memory set, the longer the recall because the amount of available activation is being divided amongst more items now. More evidence exists for the ACT-R modeling serial memory processing. It has been found that the ACT-R models the serial position error nearly perfectly. It produces the same primacy and recency effects found in earlier studies. As well, the ACT-R has been found to model acoustic errors nearly perfectly. It demonstrates the same findings of phonologically similar and different items found in earlier studies.

Another model of serial memory processing is the model for item recognition. This model helps to explain how items in the memory set are compared to the target item. It explains the processes that go into the response decision of whether the target item was present in the original memory set of items. Firstly, this model states that after the target item, being compared to the memory set, is presented, it is then encoded into the brain. The next step is to complete serial comparisons based on the mental representation of the memory items and the target item. These comparisons are completed serially, in order, and are affected by the size of the original memory set. Where the longer the original memory set of items, the longer it will take to complete the comparisons. While comparisons are being done, there is a binary decision being made for each comparison. This decision is either positive or negative, depending on whether the target item matches the representation of an item in the memory set. After each comparison, and individual decision, is completed, the responses are organized and finally expressed. This model demonstrates the relationships between lengths of memory set and longer recall time. As well, this model focuses on exhaustive processing, where all comparisons are made, regardless of whether a positive response was found.

It has been found that confusability in the items in the memory set can affect item recognition. Auditory and phonological confusability in the memory set is associated with increased encoding time. As well, visual confusability in the memory set is associated with increased comparison time. It is shown that the modality of the items can affect different processes in item recognition.

== See also ==
- Parallel processing (psychology)
