= Antonella Sorace =

Antonella Sorace is an experimental linguist and academic, specializing in bilingualism across the lifespan. Since 2002, she has been Professor of Developmental Linguistics at the University of Edinburgh, and since 2008, she has been Founding Director of Bilingualism Matters. She a Fellow of the British Academy, a Fellow of the Royal Society of Edinburgh and a Fellow of the Royal Society for the Encouragement of Arts, Manufactures and Commerce.

== Education and career ==
Sorace received a first degree (Laurea) from the Sapienza University of Rome, a Master of Arts degree from the University of Southern California, and a PhD from the University of Edinburgh in 1993 with a dissertation entitled, "Late bilingualism: lexicon-syntax interface."

Sorace's research has focused on multilingual acquisition across the lifespan, with a particular focus on highly advanced or near-native second language speakers, the changes in the native language of second language learners, and differences in acquisition in younger or older bilingual children. She is also the originator of the influential interface hypothesis. The hypothesis posits that linguistic structures that are sensitive to conditions external to the language domain, such as pragmatic, discourse, or contextual information, may remain variable in bilingual speakers, even at very advanced proficiency levels. She has recently turned her attention to the interactions between language and general cognition, which may partly be responsible for this variability. Sorace is known for her research on the lexicon-syntax interface and especially for her work on gradience in split intransitivity across languages.

She has contributed to experimental linguistics methods by pioneering the use of Magnitude Estimation for the elicitation of acceptability judgments.

Sorace is also the founder and director of Bilingualism Matters, an information and public engagement centre with branches in Europe and the United States, which aims to bridge the divide between researchers and the community at large about the facts and benefits of learning multiple languages, particularly among children.

== Recognition ==
In 2023, Sorace was elected a Fellow of the American Association for the Advancement of Science.

== Selected publications ==
- (2019) Chamorro, G. and Sorace, A. The Interface Hypothesis as a framework for studying L1 attrition. In B. Köpke and M. Schmid (eds.) The Oxford Handbook of Language Attrition. Oxford: Oxford University Press.
- (2016) Sorace, A. Referring expressions and executive functions in bilingualism. Linguistic Approaches to Bilingualism 6: 669–684. DOI: 10.1075/lab.15055.
- (2014) Sorace, A. Input, timing, and outcomes in a wider model of bilingualism. Linguistic Approaches to Bilingualism 4: 377–380.
- (2011) Sorace, A. Pinning down the concept of "interface" in bilingualism. Linguistic Approaches to Bilingualism 1: 1-33.
- (2009) Sorace, A., Serratrice, L., Filiaci, F. and Baldo, M. Discourse conditions on subject pronoun realisation: testing the linguistic intuitions of older bilingual children. "Lingua" 119: 460–477.
- (2007) Belletti, A., Bennati, E. and Sorace, A. Theoretical and developmental issues in the syntax of subjects: evidence from near-native Italian. Natural Language and Linguistic Theory 25: 657–689.
- (2004) Tsimpli, T. Sorace, A., Heycock, C. and Filiaci, F. First language attrition and syntactic subjects: a study of Greek and Italian near-native speakers of English. International Journal of Bilingualism 8: 257–277.
- (2003) Sorace, A. Near-Nativeness. In M. Long and C. Doughty (eds.), Handbook of Second Language Acquisition, 130–152. Oxford: Blackwell.
- (2000). Sorace, A. Gradients in auxiliary selection with intransitive verbs. "Language" 76: 859–890.
- (1996) Bard, E.G., Robertson, D. and Sorace, A. Magnitude Estimation of linguistic acceptability. Language 72: 32–68.
