= Third-language acquisition =

Learning and acquiring of a third language

Third-language acquisition (TLA), also known as third-language learning or L3 (language 3) acquisition, refers to multilinguals learning additional languages.

TLA is distinct from second-language acquisition, which is concerned with the acquisition of an additional language by (then) monolinguals.

The success of third language acquisition varies with age and the languages already known, which can have intricate effects on the L3 (the language that is being acquired).
