= Second Language Research =

- Discipline: Linguistics
- Language: English
- Edited by: Silvina Montrul, Roumyana Slabakova

Publication details
- History: 1985–present
- Publisher: SAGE Publications
- Frequency: Quarterly
- Impact factor: 2.178 (2020)

Standard abbreviations
- ISO 4: Second Lang. Res.

Indexing
- ISSN: 0267-6583 (print); 1477-0326 (web)
- LCCN: sn86037117
- OCLC no.: 137349135

Links
- Journal homepage; Online access; Online archive

Second Language Research is a peer-reviewed academic journal in the field of linguistics, concerned foremost with second language acquisition and second-language performance. Each year, one special issue is published, devoted to some current topic. It was established in 1985 and is published quarterly by SAGE Publications. The current editors-in-chief are Silvina Montrul and Roumyana Slabakova.

According to the Journal Citation Reports, the journal has a 2020 impact factor of 2.178.

== See also ==
- Applied Linguistics
- ITL – International Journal of Applied Linguistics
- Journal of Second Language Writing
- The Modern Language Journal
