= Error =

Incorrect or inaccurate action

An error (from the Latin errāre, meaning 'to wander') is an inaccurate or incorrect action, thought, or judgement.

In statistics, "error" refers to the difference between the value which has been computed and the correct value. An error could result in failure or in a deviation from the intended performance or behavior.

== Human behavior ==
One reference differentiates between "error" and "mistake" as follows:

An 'error' is a deviation from accuracy or correctness. A 'mistake' is an error caused by a fault: the fault being misjudgment, carelessness, or forgetfulness. Now, say that I run a stop sign because I was in a hurry, and wasn't concentrating, and the police stop me, that is a mistake. If, however, I try to park in an area with conflicting signs, and I get a ticket because I was incorrect on my interpretation of what the signs meant, that would be an error. The first time it would be an error. The second time it would be a mistake since I should have known better.

In human behavior the norms or expectations for behavior or its consequences can be derived from the intention of the actor or from the expectations of other individuals or from a social grouping or from social norms. (See deviance.) Gaffes and faux pas can be labels for certain instances of this kind of error. More serious departures from social norms carry labels such as misbehavior and labels from the legal system, such as misdemeanor and crime. Departures from norms connected to religion can have other labels, such as sin.

=== Language ===
An individual language user's deviations from standard language norms in grammar, pronunciation and orthography are sometimes referred to as errors. However, in light of the role of language usage in everyday social class distinctions, many feel that linguistics should restrain itself from such prescriptivist judgments to avoid reinforcing dominant class value claims about what linguistic forms should and should not be used. One may distinguish various kinds of linguistic errors – some, such as aphasia or speech disorders, where the user is unable to say what they intend to, are generally considered errors, while cases where natural, intended speech is non-standard (as in vernacular dialects), are considered legitimate speech in scholarly linguistics, but might be considered errors in prescriptivist contexts. See also Error analysis (linguistics).

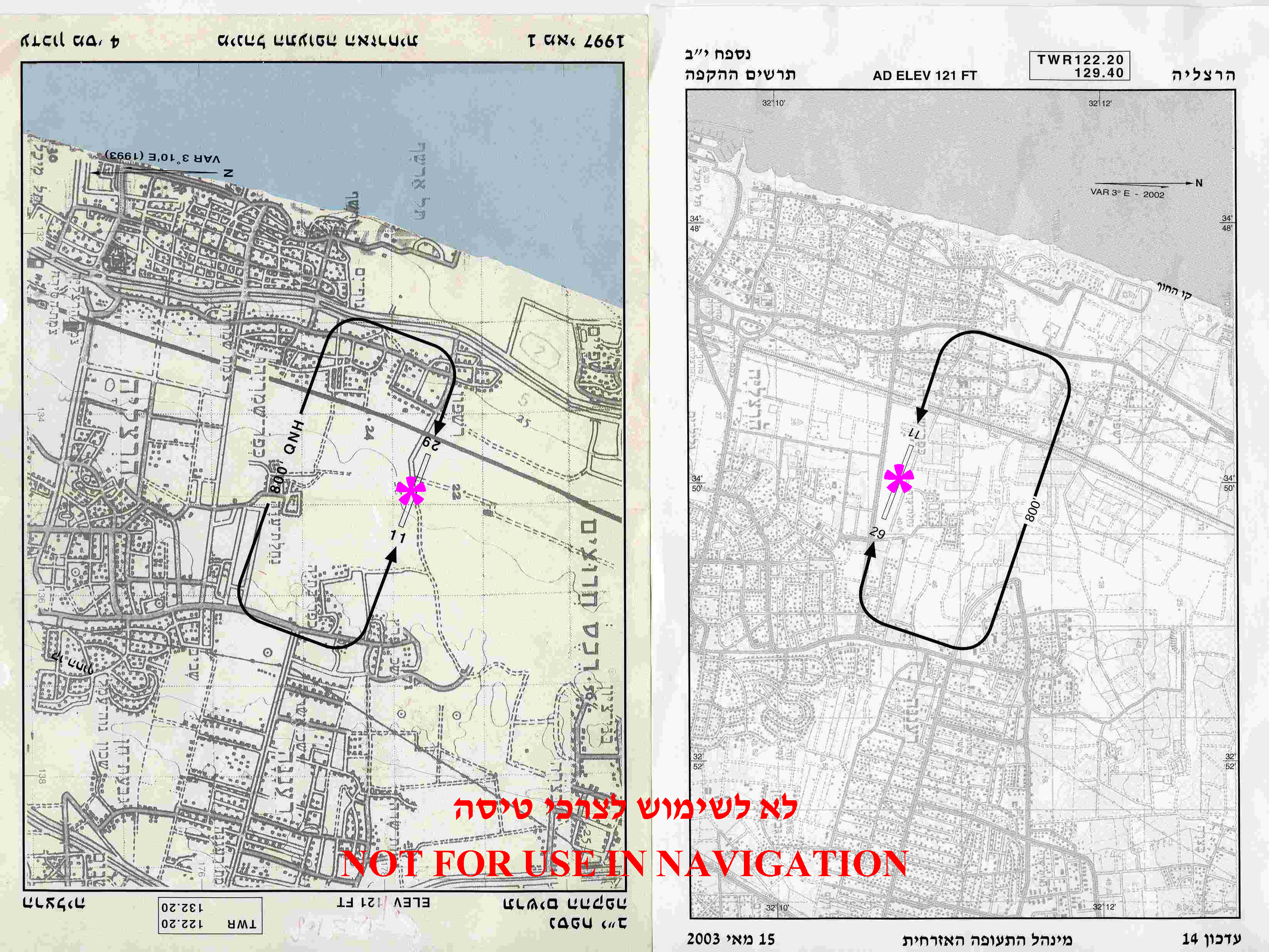
Herzliya Airport (Israel) runway location and traffic pattern chart (left) was erroneously printed as a result of "black layer" 180° misplacement. The corrected chart is on the right. (Note north is to the right on both charts.)

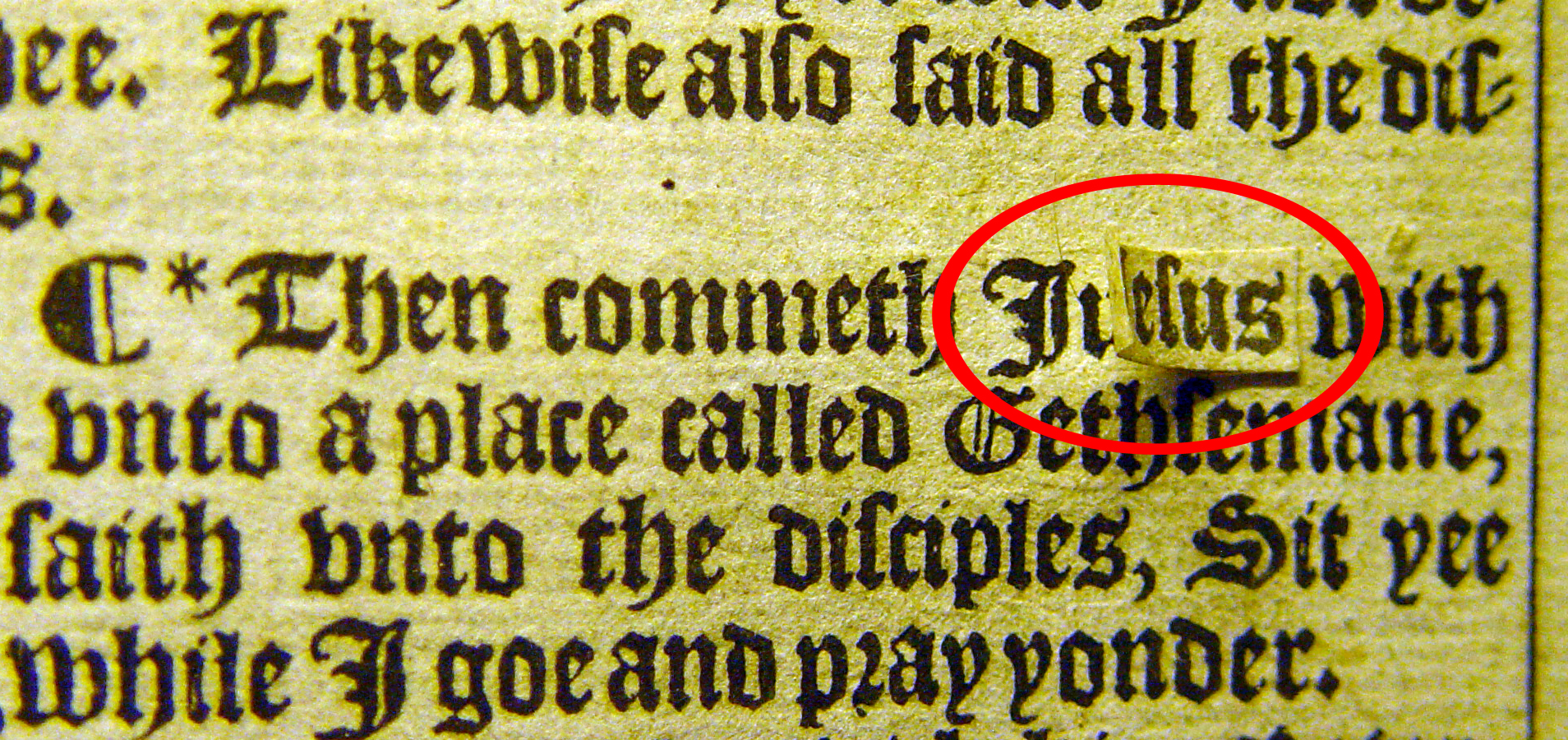
The 'Judas' Bible in St Mary's Church, Totnes, Devon. In this edition 'Judas' appears instead of 'Jesus' in Matthew 26:36. This copy has the misprint corrected by a slip of paper pasted over it.

=== Gaffe ===
A gaffe is usually made in a social environment and may come from saying something that may be true but inappropriate. It may also be an erroneous attempt to reveal a truth. Gaffes can be malapropisms, grammatical errors or other verbal and gestural weaknesses or revelations through body language. Actually revealing factual or social truth through words or body language, however, can commonly result in embarrassment or, when the gaffe has negative connotations, friction between people involved.

Philosophers and psychologists interested in the nature of the gaffe include Sigmund Freud (Freudian slip) and Gilles Deleuze. Deleuze, in his The Logic of Sense, places the gaffe in a developmental process that can culminate in stuttering.

Sportswriters and journalists commonly use "gaffe" to refer to any kind of mistake, e.g. a dropped ball (baseball error) by a player in a baseball game.

== Science and engineering ==
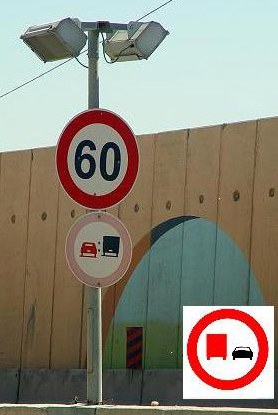
Erroneous traffic sign in Israel. The correct sign is depicted on the lower-right corner.

In statistics, an error (or residual) is not a "mistake" but rather a difference between a computed, estimated, or measured value and the accepted true, specified, or theoretically correct value.

In science and engineering in general, an error is defined as a difference between the desired and actual performance or behavior of a system or object. This definition is the basis of operation for many types of control systems, in which error is defined as the difference between a set point and the process value. An example of this would be the thermostat in a home heating system – the operation of the heating equipment is controlled by the difference (the error) between the thermostat setting and the sensed air temperature. Another approach is related to considering a scientific hypothesis as true or false, giving birth to two types of errors: Type 1 and Type 2. The first one is when a true hypothesis is considered false, while the second is when a false one is considered true.

Engineers seek to design devices, machines and systems and in such a way as to mitigate or preferably avoid the effects of error, whether unintentional or not. Such errors in a system can be latent design errors that may go unnoticed for years, until the right set of circumstances arises that cause them to become active. Other errors in engineered systems can arise due to human error, which includes cognitive bias. Human factors engineering is often applied to designs in an attempt to minimize this type of error by making systems more forgiving or error-tolerant.

(In computational mechanics, when solving a system such as Ax = b there is a distinction between the "error" – the inaccuracy in x – and residual – the inaccuracy in Ax.)

A notable result of Engineering and Scientific errors that occurred in history is the Chernobyl disaster of 1986, which caused a nuclear meltdown in the City of Chernobyl in present-day Ukraine, and is used as a case study in many Engineering/Science research

Erroneous outputs of generative AI models are known as "hallucinations."

=== Error detection and correction ===
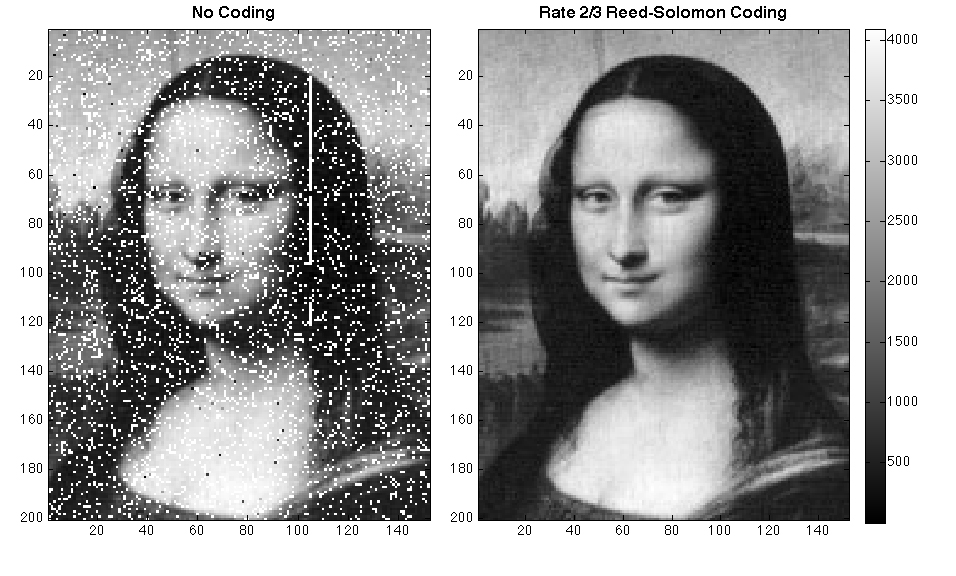
To clean up transmission errors introduced by Earth's atmosphere (left), Goddard scientists applied Reed–Solomon error correction (right), which is commonly used in CDs and DVDs. Typical errors include missing pixels (white) and false signals (black). The white stripe indicates a brief period when transmission was interrupted.

In information theory and coding theory with applications in computer science and telecommunications, error detection and correction (EDAC) or error control are techniques that enable reliable delivery of digital data over unreliable communication channels. Many communication channels are subject to channel noise, and thus errors may be introduced during transmission from the source to a receiver. Error detection techniques allow detecting such errors, while error correction enables reconstruction of the original data in many cases.

== Numerical analysis ==
Numerical analysis provides a variety of techniques to represent (store) and compute approximations to mathematical numerical values. Errors arise from a trade-off between efficiency (space and computation time) and precision, which is limited anyway, since (using common floating-point arithmetic) only a finite amount of values can be represented exactly. The discrepancy between the exact mathematical value and the stored/computed value is called the approximation error.

== Cybernetics ==
In applying corrections to the trajectory or course being steered, cybernetics can be seen as the most general approach to error and its correction for the achievement of any goal. The term was suggested by Norbert Wiener to describe a new science of control and information in the animal and the machine. Wiener's early work was on noise.

The cybernetician Gordon Pask held that the error that drives a servomechanism can be seen as a difference between a pair of analogous concepts in a servomechanism: the current state and the goal state. Later he suggested error can also be seen as an innovation or a contradiction depending on the context and perspective of interacting (observer) participants. The founder of management cybernetics, Stafford Beer, applied these ideas most notably in his viable system model.

== Biology ==
In biology, an error is said to occur when perfect fidelity is lost in the copying of information. For example, in an asexually reproducing species, an error (or mutation) has occurred for each DNA nucleotide that differs between the child and the parent. Many of these mutations can be harmful, but unlike other types of errors, some are neutral or even beneficial. Mutations are an important force driving evolution. Mutations that make organisms more adapted to their environment increase in the population through natural selection as organisms with favorable mutations have more offspring.

== Philately ==
In philately, an error refers to a postage stamp or piece of postal stationery that exhibits a printing or production mistake that differentiates it from a normal specimen or from the intended result. Examples are stamps printed in the wrong color or missing one or more colors, printed with a vignette inverted in relation to its frame, produced without any perforations on one or more sides when the normal stamps are perforated, or printed on the wrong type of paper. Legitimate errors must always be produced and sold unintentionally. Such errors may or may not be scarce or rare. A design error may refer to a mistake in the design of the stamp, such as a mislabeled subject, even if there are no printing or production mistakes.

== Law ==
In appellate review, error typically refers to mistakes made by a trial court or some other court of first instance in applying the law in a particular legal case. This may involve such mistakes as improper admission of evidence, inappropriate instructions to the jury, or applying the wrong standard of proof.

== Stock market ==
A stock market error is a stock market transaction that was done due to an error, due to human failure or computer errors.

== Governmental policy ==
Within United States government intelligence agencies, such as Central Intelligence Agency agencies, error refers to intelligence error, as previous assumptions that used to exist at a senior intelligence level within senior intelligence agencies, but has since been disproven, and is sometimes eventually listed as unclassified, and therefore more available to the public and citizenry of the United States. The Freedom of information act provides American citizenry with a means to read intelligence reports that were mired in error. Per United States Central Intelligence Agency's website (as of August, 2008) intelligence error is described as:

"Intelligence errors are factual inaccuracies in analysis resulting from poor or missing data; intelligence failure is systemic organizational surprise resulting from incorrect, missing, discarded, or inadequate hypotheses."

== Numismatics ==
In numismatics, an error refers to a coin or medal that has a minting mistake, similar to errors found in philately. Because the U.S. Bureau of the Mint keeps a careful eye on all potential errors, errors on U.S. coins are very few and usually very scarce. Examples of numismatic errors: extra metal attached to a coin, a clipped coin caused by the coin stamp machine stamping a second coin too early, double stamping of a coin. A coin that has been overdated, e.g. 1942/41, is also considered an error.

== Linguistics ==
In applied linguistics, an error is an unintended deviation from the immanent rules of a language variety made by a second language learner. Such errors result from the learner's lack of knowledge of the correct rules of the target language variety. A significant distinction is generally made between errors (systematic deviations) and mistakes (speech performance errors) which are not treated the same from a linguistic viewpoint. The study of learners' errors has been the main area of investigation by linguists in the history of second-language acquisition research.

== Medicine ==
A medical error is a preventable adverse effect of care ("iatrogenesis"), whether or not it is evident or harmful to the patient. This might include an inaccurate or incomplete diagnosis or treatment of a disease, injury, syndrome, behavior, infection, or other ailment.

The word error in medicine is used as a label for nearly all of the clinical incidents that harm patients. Medical errors are often described as human errors in healthcare. Whether the label is a medical error or human error, one definition used in medicine says that it occurs when a healthcare provider chooses an inappropriate method of care, improperly executes an appropriate method of care, or reads the wrong CT scan. It has been said that the definition should be the subject of more debate. For instance, studies of hand hygiene compliance of physicians in an ICU show that compliance varied from 19% to 85%. The deaths that result from infections caught as a result of treatment providers improperly executing an appropriate method of care by not complying with known safety standards for hand hygiene are difficult to regard as innocent accidents or mistakes.

There are many types of medical error, from minor to major, and causality is often poorly determined.

There are many taxonomies for classifying medical errors.

== See also ==
- Blooper
- Blunder (chess) – Error in chess that severely worsens the player's position
- Fallacy – Error in reasoning
- Margin of error
- Nonconformity – Production quality terminology
- Perfection
- Trial and error
