= Error analysis =

Error analysis can refer to one of the following:

- Error analysis (mathematics) is concerned with the changes in the output of the model as the parameters to the model vary about a mean.
- Error analysis (linguistics) studies the types and causes of language errors.
- Error analysis for the Global Positioning System
- "Error analysis" is sometimes used for engineering practices such as described under Fault tree analysis.
