= Steven Moussala =

Photographer from Congo

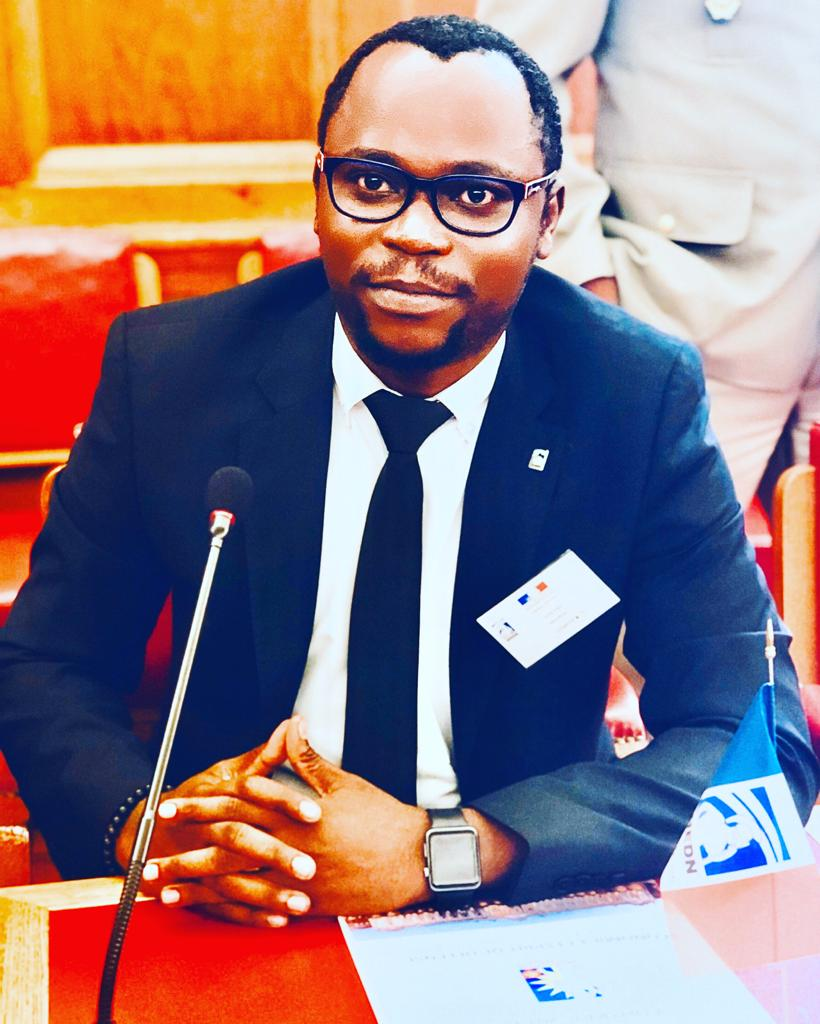
- At the Toulouse Regional Prefecture as part of the IHEDN session
- Born: January 17, 1986 (age 39); Brazzaville
- Occupation: Photographer

Steven Moussala, known as Steven Lumière, born January 17, 1986, in Congo - Brazzaville, is a consultant in strategic communication and artist photographer Franco-Congolese, best known through his photo project "Taxi Photo".

== Book ==
- Moussala, Steven (November 12, 2013). "Une histoire de la photographie au Congo-Brazzaville". Africultures (in French). 88 (2) (revue africultures ed.). Cairn Info: 145–161. doi:10.3917/afcul.088.0145.

== Bibliography ==
- Malu-Malu, Muriel Devey (2019). Congo Brazzaville. KARTHALA Editions. p. 351. ISBN 9782811125950.
