= The Psychopathology of Everyday Life =

1901 book by Sigmund Freud

- Cover of the German edition
- Author: Sigmund Freud
- Original title: Zur Psychopathologie des Alltagslebens
- Translator: A. A. Brill (first version)
- Language: German
- Subject: Freudian slip
- Publication place: Germany

Psychopathology of Everyday Life (German: Zur Psychopathologie des Alltagslebens) is a 1901 work by Sigmund Freud, the founder of psychoanalysis. Based on Freud's researches into slips and parapraxes from 1897 onwards, it became perhaps the best-known of all Freud's writings.

== Editorial history ==
The Psychopathology was originally published in the Monograph for Psychiatry and Neurology in 1901, before appearing in book form in 1904. It would receive twelve foreign translations during Freud's lifetime, as well as numerous new German editions, with fresh material being added in almost every one. James Strachey objected that "Almost the whole of the basic explanations and theories were already present in the earliest edition...the wealth of new examples interrupts and even confuses the mainstream of the underlying argument". However, in such a popular and theory-light text, the sheer wealth of examples helped make Freud's point for him in an accessible way. A new English-language translation by Anthea Bell was published in 2003.

Among the most overtly autobiographical of Freud's works, the Psychopathology was strongly linked by Freud to his relationship with Wilhelm Fliess.

== Summary ==
Studying the various deviations from the stereotypes of everyday behavior, strange defects and malfunctions, as well as seemingly random errors, the author concludes that they indicate the underlying pathology of the psyche, the symptoms of psychoneurosis.

Freud writes in his introduction:

"During the year 1898 I published a short essay on the Psychic Mechanism of Forgetfulness. I shall now repeat its contents and take it as a starting-point for further discussion. I have there undertaken a psychologic analysis of a common case of temporary forgetfulness of proper names, and from a pregnant example of my own observation I have reached the conclusion that this frequent and practically unimportant occurrence of a failure of a psychic function – of memory – admits an explanation which goes beyond the customary utilization of this phenomenon. If an average psychologist should be asked to explain how it happens that we often fail to recall a name which we are sure we know, he would probably content himself with the answer that proper names are more apt to be forgotten than any other content of memory. He might give plausible reasons for this 'forgetting preference' for proper names, but he would not assume any deep determinant for the process."

Freud believed that various deviations from the stereotypes of everyday conduct - seemingly unintended reservation, forgetting words, random movements and actions - are a manifestation of unconscious thoughts and impulses. Explaining "wrong actions" with the help of psychoanalysis, just as the interpretation of dreams, can be effectively used for diagnosis and therapy.

Considering the numerous cases of such deviations, he concludes that the boundary between the normal and abnormal human psyche is unstable and that we are all a bit neurotic. Such symptoms are able to disrupt eating, sexual relations, regular work, and communication with others.

In the last chapter of his book, Freud deals with the problem of psychic determinism, for which he makes a case. He argues that "If one investigates, let us say, this seeming voluntary formation, for example, of a number of many digits uttered in unrestrained mirth, it always proves to be so strictly determined that the determination seems impossible". He then discusses a famous case of a name "arbitrarily chosen", the Dora's one. Analysing the motivation of his choice, it occurred to him that the nurse of his sister's children was named Dora. Then a slight recent event soon flashed into his mind which brought the looked-for determination. On his sister's dining-room he noticed a letter with the address "Miss Rosa W.". Flabbergasted, he was informed that the real name of Dora was in fact Rose, and that she had agreed to have her name changed in order to get the job, because Rosa would also refer to his sister".

Freud's conclusion is that:

"The unconscious, at all events, knows no time limit. The most important as well as the most peculiar character of psychic fixation consists in the fact that all impressions are on the one hand retained in the same form as they were received, and also in the forms that they have assumed in their further development. This state of affairs cannot be elucidated by any comparison from any other sphere. By virtue of this theory every former state of the memory content may thus be restored, even though all original relations have long been replaced by newer ones."

== Influence and reception ==
Sometimes called the Mistake Book (to go with the Dream Book and the Joke Book), The Psychopathology of Everyday Life became one of the scientific classics of the 20th century. Freud realised he was becoming a celebrity when he found his cabin-steward reading the Mistake Book on his 1909 visit to the States. The Rat Man came to Freud for analysis as a result of reading the Psychopathology of Everyday Life. The psychoanalyst Jacques Lacan considered The Psychopathology of Everyday Life one of the three key texts for an understanding of the unconscious, alongside The Interpretation of Dreams (1900), and Jokes and their Relation to the Unconscious (1905). Through its stress on what Freud called "switch words" and "verbal bridges", The Psychopathology of Everyday Life is considered important for psychopathology.

Strachey's English translation is criticized by the psychologist Louis Breger, who writes that Strachey translates the word for slips or mistakes as "parapraxis" when the English "blunder" or "faulty action" would have been more appropriate, and uses the Latinisms "id" and "ego" where "it" and "I" would have better captured Freud's language. The philosopher Michel Onfray argues that The Psychopathology of Everyday Life is not scientific. Jacques Bénesteau writes that Freud added lies in each edition. The philosopher Mikkel Borch-Jacobsen and the psychologist Sonu Shamdasani write that Freud's coupling of an analysis of his dreams and childhood memories had a precedent in Belgian psychologist Joseph Delboeuf's Sleep and Dreams, one of the major themes of which is the capacity of dreams to recall forgotten memories.

== See also ==
- Double entendre
- Doublespeak
- Introduction to Psychoanalysis
- Lapsus
- Signorelli parapraxis
