= Affect (linguistics) =

Attitude or emotion of an utterance

In linguistics, affect is an attitude or emotion that a speaker brings to an utterance. Affects such as sarcasm, contempt, dismissal, distaste, disgust, disbelief, exasperation, boredom, anger, joy, respect or disrespect, sympathy, pity, gratitude, wonder, admiration, humility, and awe are frequently conveyed through paralinguistic mechanisms such as intonation, facial expression, and gesture, and thus require recourse to punctuation or emoticons when reduced to writing, but there are grammatical and lexical expressions of affect as well, such as pejorative and approbative or laudative expressions or inflections, adversative forms, honorific and deferential language, interrogatives and tag questions, and some types of evidentiality.

== Lexical affect ==
Lexical choices may frame a speaker's affect, such as slender (positive affect) vs. scrawny (negative affect), thrifty (positive) vs. stingy (negative) and freedom fighter (positive) vs. terrorist (negative).

== Grammatical affect ==
In many languages of Europe, augmentative derivations are used to express contempt or other negative attitudes toward the noun being so modified, whereas diminutives may express affection; on the other hand, diminutives are frequently used to belittle or be dismissive. For instance, in Spanish, a name ending in diminutive -ito (masculine) or -ita (feminine) may be a term of endearment, but señorito "little mister" for señor "mister" may be mocking. Polish has a range of augmentative and diminutive forms, which express differences in affect. So, from żaba "a frog", besides żabucha for simply a big frog, there is augmentative żabsko to express distaste, żabisko if the frog is ugly, żabula if it is likeably awkward, etc.

Affect can also be conveyed by more subtle means. Duranti, for example, shows that the use of pronouns in Italian narration indicates that the character referred to is important to the narration but is generally also a mark of a positive speaker attitude toward the character.

In Japanese and Korean, grammatical affect is conveyed both through honorific, polite, and humble language, which affects both nouns and verbal inflection, and through clause-final particles that express a range of speaker emotions and attitudes toward what is being said. For instance, when asked in Japanese if what one is eating is good, one might say 美味しい oishii "it's delicious" or まずい mazui "it's bad" with various particles for nuance:

美味しいよ Oishii yo (making an assertion; explicitly informing that it is good)
美味しいわ Oishii wa! (expressing joy; feminine)
美味しいけど Oishii kedo ("it's good but ...")
まずいね Mazui ne ("it's bad, isn't it?" -- eliciting agreement)
まずいもん Mazui mon (exasperated)

The same can be done in Korean:

맛있어요 Masi-issoyo (Neutral, polite)
맛있군요 Masi-ittgunyo! (Surprised, elated)
맛있잖아 Masi-ittjianha (lit. "It's not delicious", but connotes "It's delicious, no?")
맛이 없다 Masi-eopda (the base verb form for "bad tasting", used as a blunt, impolite statement)

In English and Japanese, the passive of intransitive verbs may be used to express an adversative situation:

| Active voice (neutral affect) | 雨が 降った。 ame-ga fut-ta rain-NOM fall-PFV; It rained. |
| Passive voice (negative affect) | 雨に 降られた。 ame-ni fu-rare-ta rain-DAT fall-PASS-PFV; I was rained on. |

In some languages with split intransitive grammars, such as the Central Pomo language of California, the choice of encoding an affected verb argument as an "object" (patientive case) reflects empathy or emotional involvement on the part of the speaker:

ʔaː=tʼo béda=ht̪ow béː=yo-w dá-ːʔ-du-w tʃʰó-w. béda ʔaː qʼlá-w=ʔkʰe.
1.AGT=but here=from away=go-PFV want-REFL-IPFV-PFV not-PFV. here I.AGT die-PFV=FUT.
"(But) I don't want to go away from here. I (agentive) will die here." (said matter-of-factly)

ʔaː tʃá=ʔel ʔtʃí=hla t̪oː qʼlá=hla tʼo?
I.AGT house=the get=if I.PAT die=if but
"(But) what if I (patientive) died after I got the house?" (given as a reason not to buy a new house)

== See also ==
- Propositional attitude
