= Rector v. Major League Baseball Advanced Media =

Defamation lawsuit

Rector v. MLB, ESPN et al.
- Court: New York Supreme Court, County of the Bronx
- Full case name: Andrew Robert Rector v. Major League Baseball Advanced Media, ESPN New York, et al.
- Citation: No. 303630-2014 (N.Y. Sup. Bronx Co. 2014)

Case opinions
- Decision by: Julia Rodriguez

Keywords
- defamation

Rector v. Major League Baseball Advanced Media, No. 303630 (N.Y. Sup. Bronx Co. 2014), was a New York Supreme Court defamation case. Andrew Rector sued Major League Baseball, the New York Yankees, ESPN and their MLB announcers for broadcasting images of him sleeping at a game at Yankee Stadium between the New York Yankees and the Boston Red Sox and allegedly making defamatory comments about him. Rector sued for $10 million for "defamation and intentional infliction of emotional distress". The case was dismissed by Judge Julia Rodriguez, who ruled that the statements made were not defamatory.

== Background ==
On April 13, 2014, Rector attended Yankee Stadium to watch the New York Yankees play the Boston Red Sox in a Red Sox–Yankees rivalry game. During the fourth inning, Rector was filmed by ESPN sleeping in his seat with the footage broadcast to viewers during their live coverage of the game. ESPN New York announcers Dan Shulman and John Kruk made a number of jokes about him when his image was placed on the stadium jumbotron. They initially commented that Rector was oblivious to the quality of MLB.tv that they had been promoting in commentary prior to Rector's image being broadcast and then made comments about Rector, questioning how he could sleep through a Carlos Beltran home run and stated that the person who sat next to him did not want to share his food with Rector. They also compared Rector's body size to Kruk's. MLB later posted the broadcast video of Rector sleeping online where it was covered by a number of media organizations worldwide. Rector filed a defamation lawsuit at the New York Supreme Court in The Bronx, New York against MLB, ESPN, the Yankees and the ESPN announcers for $10 million alleging that they subjected him to "an unending verbal crusade". Legal experts speculated that the challenge would not be successful owing to the statements causing emotional stress rather than damaging reputation and due to defamation cases historically being unsuccessful under New York State law.

== Case ==
Rector alleged in his claim, which was reportedly full of typographical and grammatical errors, that the announcers had called him "a fatty cow", then used words such as stupor, unintelligent and stupid, and said that he was "not worthy to be a fan." He also alleged that MLB.com had posted numerous memes, including one of him involved in a homosexual kiss and one with the caption of "Yankee's [sic] Fan cares not for your rivalry talk", that implied that he supported what was occurring in the images. He claimed that the MLB's posting of the video online "set the stage" for further defamatory comments from online viewers. The MLB's legal team filed a motion to dismiss on procedural grounds, as Rector had not stated a cause of action, and the statements in question had been loose and hyperbolic and not malicious defamation. The MLB, ESPN and the New York Yankees submitted CD copies of both the incident and the entire broadcast, which they stated showed that the statements alleged by the plaintiff were not made.

In court, Judge Julia Rodriguez granted the defendants' motions. In her judgement, she stated that the CDs of the broadcasts showed that the announcers did not make the statements alleged in the complaint and that they had been made by other individuals on websites not run by the defendants. While she agreed that comments had been made about Rector's weight and his ability to sleep through a standing ovation, he was only shown and commented on for 31 seconds; the judge ruled the comments made did not meet the legal standard of defamation. She also stated that ESPN had not broadcast Rector unauthorized, as it was common practice for broadcasters at baseball games to show spectators. Judge Rodriguez stated that with regard to Rector's claim of "emotional distress", none of the alleged comments were attributable to the defendants and they could not be held responsible for alleged defamatory comments made by third parties on third-party websites, as there was no duty of care to protect him from those statements. As a result, the case was dismissed.

== Aftermath ==
Following Rector's filing of the case being made public, news organisations criticized the action as frivolous litigation. Legal commentators stated that due to the media attention that the case brought, Rector probably ended up causing more damage to his reputation by bringing the case than the initial broadcast would have. Rector's lawyer, Valentine Okwara had stated that he had advised his client that "there is room for appeal". The lawsuit has since been used as a case study on the issue of defamation at sports events.
