= Interlanguage =

Idiolect used by a second language learner

An interlanguage is an idiolect developed by a learner of a second language (L2) which preserves some features of their first language (L1) and can overgeneralize some L2 writing and speaking rules. These two characteristics give an interlanguage its unique linguistic organization. It is idiosyncratically based on the learner's experiences with L2. An interlanguage can fossilize, or cease developing, in any of its developmental stages. Several factors can shape interlanguage rules, including L1 transfer, previous learning strategies, strategies of L2 acquisition, L2 communication strategies, and the overgeneralization of L2 language patterns.

Interlanguage theory posits that a dormant psychological framework in the human brain is activated with study of a second language. The theory is credited to Larry Selinker, who coined the terms interlanguage and fossilization. Uriel Weinreich is credited with providing the basis for Selinker's research. Selinker noted in 1972 that in a given situation, the utterances of a learner differ from those of a native speaker to convey an identical meaning. This comparison suggests a separate linguistic system, which can be observed in the utterances of a learner attempting to convey meaning in L2. It is not seen when the learner performs form-focused tasks, such as oral drills in a classroom.

Interlanguage can vary in different contexts, and may be more accurate, complex, and fluent in one domain than in another. A learner's interlanguage utterances may be compared with two things: utterances in L1 to convey the message produced by the learner, and utterances by a native speaker of L2 to convey the same message. An interlanguage perspective may be used to view a learner's underlying knowledge of the target-language sound system (interlanguage phonology), grammar (morphology and syntax), vocabulary (lexicon), and linguistic norms (interlanguage pragmatics). By describing how learner language conforms to universal linguistic norms, interlanguage research has contributed to the understanding of linguistic universals in second-language acquisition.

== Background ==
The principal theory of second-language (L2) development had been contrastive analysis, which assumed that learner errors were caused by the difference between L1 (their first language) and L2. It was deficit-focused; speech errors were thought to arise randomly, and should be corrected. It was further assumed that a thorough analysis of the differences between a learner's L1 and L2 could predict the difficulties they would face. This assumption was often anecdotal, and research claims were prone to confirmation bias.

In 1957, Robert Lado said that contrastive analysis should be viewed as hypothetical unless it was based on systematic analyses of learner speech data. Around this time, second-language-acquisition research shifted from hypotheses of language learning and development of language-teaching materials to the systematic analysis of learner speech and writing with error analysis. This was initially done to validate contrastive analysis, but researchers found that many learner behaviors could not be easily explained by transfer from a learner's L1 to L2. The idea that a language learner's linguistic system differed from L1 and L2 was developed independently at around the same time by several researchers. William Nemser called it an approximative system, and Pit Corder termed it transitional competence.

== Variability ==
Interlanguage is said to be a language in its own right, and L2 varies much more than L1. Selinker wrote that in a given situation, the utterances of a learner differ from what a native speaker would produce to convey the same meaning. This comparison reveals a separate linguistic system.

Interlanguage varies by context, and may be more accurate, complex, and fluent in one discourse domain than in another. Variability is observed when comparing a learner's conversational utterances with form-focused tasks, such as memory-based oral drills in a classroom. Spontaneous conversations are more likely to use interlanguage. A learner may produce a target-like variant (e.g. "I don't") in one context, and a non-target-like variant ("me no") in another. Scholars differ about the importance of this phenomenon. Those with a Chomskyan perspective on second-language acquisition typically regard variability as performance errors unworthy of systematic inquiry. Those with a sociolinguistic or psycholinguistic orientation view variability as an inherent feature of a learner's interlanguage; a learner's preference for one linguistic variant over another can depend on social (contextual) variables, such as the status (or role) of the person to whom the learner is speaking. Preference may also be based on linguistic variables, such as the phonological environment or neighboring features denoting formality or informality. Variability in learner language distinguishes between free variation (not systematically related to accompanying linguistic or social features) and systematic variation, which is systematically related.

=== Free variation ===
Free variation in the use of a language feature is usually taken as a sign that it has not been fully acquired; the learner is still figuring out which rules govern the use of alternate forms.

=== Systematic variation ===
Systematic variation is brought about by changes in linguistic, psychological, and social context. Linguistic factors are usually local; for example, a learner in an earlier stage of acquisition will often systematically vary the correct tense. They may say "Last year we travel to the ocean", rather than "Last year we travelled to the ocean." Learners also tend to make more mistakes when the word following a tensed word begins with a consonant (e.g. "burned bacon"), and have greater accuracy when the word following the tensed word begins with a vowel ("burned eggs").

=== Other factors ===
Social factors may include a change in the register or the familiarity of interlocutors. According to communication accommodation theory, a learner may adapt their speech to converge with or diverge from their interlocutor's usage; for example, they may deliberately use a non-target form like "me no" to an English teacher to assert their identity with a non-mainstream ethnic group.

The most important psychological factor is usually regarded as attention to form, which is related to planning time. The more time that learners have to plan, the more target-like their production may be. Literate learners may produce more target-like forms in a writing task for which they have 30 minutes to plan than in a conversation where they must produce language with almost no planning at all. The impact of alphabetic literacy on an L2 learner's ability to pay attention to form is unclear.

Affective factors also play a role in systematic variation; learners in a stressful situation, such as a formal exam, may produce fewer target-like forms than they would in a comfortable setting. This interacts with social factors, and attitudes toward the interlocutor and topic also play a role.

== Stages of development ==
Individuals learning a second language may not always hear spoken L2 words as separate units; some words might blend and become a single unit in the learner's L2 system. These blended words are known as prefabricated patterns or chunks. These chunks are often not immediately obvious to the learner or a person who hears them speak, but may become noticeable as the learner's L2 system develops and they use the chunk inappropriately. If an English learner hears sentences beginning with "do you", they may hear it as indicating a question (not as two separate words); to them, the word is "doyou". They may say, "What do you doing?" instead of "What are you doing?" The learner may eventually learn to break down the chunk into its component words and use them correctly.

When learners significantly restructure their L2 systems, they sometimes develop a U-shaped learning pattern; a group of English learners moved over time from accurate use of the -ing present progressive morpheme to (incorrectly) omitting it, before finally returning to the correct use. The period of incorrect use is sometimes seen as a learning regression. When the learners first acquired the new -ing morpheme (or chunk), however, they were probably not aware of all the rules governing its use. Their increasing knowledge of tense in English disrupted their correct use of the morpheme, and they eventually returned to correct use when they had a greater understanding of English-language tense rules. The learners were evidently initially memorizing individual words with the present progressive -ing morpheme. At a later stage, however, their systems had the rule that they should use the infinitive to express present action (without a separate rule governing -ing). Finally, they learned the rule for the appropriate use of -ing.

The chunking method enables a learner to practice speaking L2 before they can break a chunk down into its parts. According to interlanguage theory, this apparent progression and regression of language learning indicates the learner's increased understanding of L2 grammar.

== Fossilization ==
An interlanguage can fossilize, or cease developing, at any developmental stage. Fossilization is freezing the transition between L1 and L2; it is the final stage of interlanguage development, and can occur even in motivated learners who are continuously exposed to L2 and have adequate learning support. It may be due to complacency, or an inability to overcome obstacles to attain full proficiency in L2. Fossilization often occurs in adult language learners and can occur when the learner succeeds in conveying messages with their current L2 proficiency. Without a need to correct form or structure, the learner fossilizes instead of correcting.

== Linguistic universals ==
Research on universal grammar (UG) has influenced second-language acquisition (SLA) theory, and interlanguage scholarship has sought to demonstrate that learner languages conform to UG throughout development. Interlanguage UG differs from native UG in that interlanguage UGs vary in mental representations from one L2 user to another. This variability arises from different relative influences on the interlanguage UG, such as existing L1 knowledge and UG constraints. An example of a UG constraint is an island constraint, where the wh-phrase in a question has a finite number of possible positions. Island constraints are based on the concept that syntactical domains in a sentence act as phrase boundaries, and it is theorized that the same constraints on a native UG are often present in an interlanguage UG.

== Relationship to creoles and pidgins ==
Interlanguage is related to other types of language, particularly creoles and pidgins; each has its own grammar and phonology. The difference is mainly variability, since a learner's interlanguage is spoken only by the learner and changes as they become more proficient in L2. Creoles and pidgins are generally the product of groups of people in contact with another language, however, and may be more stable.

== See also ==
- Code-switching
- Franglais
- Fremdsprachen und Hochschule
- Language transfer
- Macaronic language
- Multilingualism
- Second-language acquisition
- Spanglish
- Translanguaging
- Media Lengua
