= Lapsus =

Involuntary mistake made while writing or speaking

In philology, a lapsus (Latin for "lapse, slip, error") is an involuntary mistake made while writing or speaking.

== Investigations ==
In 1895 an investigation into verbal slips was undertaken by a philologist and a psychologist, Rudolf Meringer and Karl Mayer, who collected many examples and divided them into separate types.

=== Psychoanalysis ===
Freud was to become interested in such mistakes from 1897 onwards, developing an interpretation of slips in terms of their unconscious meaning. Subsequently, followers of his like Ernest Jones developed the theme of lapsus in connection with writing, typing, and misprints.

According to Freud's early psychoanalytic theory, a lapsus represents a bungled act that hides an unconscious desire: “the phenomena can be traced back to incompletely suppressed psychical material...pushed away by consciousness”.

Jacques Lacan would thoroughly endorse the Freudian interpretation of unconscious motivation in the slip, arguing that “in the lapsus it is...clear that every unsuccessful act is a successful, not to say 'well-turned', discourse”.

In the seventies Sebastiano Timpanaro would controversially take up the question again, by offering a mechanistic explanation of all such slips, in opposition to Freud's theories.

== Types of lapsus ==
In literature, a number of different types of lapsus are named depending on context:

- lapsus linguae (pl. same): slip of the tongue
- lapsus calami: slip of the pen
  - lapsus manus: slip of the hand; a synonym for lapsus calami
  - lapsus clavis: slip of the key (implying a typewriter or computer keyboard)
- lapsus memoriae: slip of memory

=== Types of slips of the tongue ===
Slips of the tongue can happen on any level:

- Syntactic — "is" instead of "was".
- Phrasal slips of tongue — "I'll explain this tornado later".
- Lexical/semantic — "moon full" instead of "full moon".
- Morphological level — "workings paper".
- Phonological (sound slips) — "flow snurries" instead of "snow flurries".

Each of these five types of error may take various forms:

- Anticipation: An early item is corrupted by an element belonging to a later one, thus "reading list" — "leading list"
- Perseveration or post-sonance: A later item is corrupted by an element belonging to an earlier one Thus "waking rabbits" — "waking wabbits".
- Deletion: An element is lost, thus "same state" — "same sate"
- Shift or spoonerism: Moving a letter, thus "black foxes" — "back floxes"
- Haplology or fusion: Half one word and half the other, thus "stummy" instead of "stomach or tummy"
- Pun

== Motivation ==
Meringer and Mayer highlighted the role of familiar associations and similarities of words and sounds in producing the lapsus. Freud objected that such factors did not cause but only "favour slips of the tongue...in the immense majority of cases my speech is not disturbed by the circumstance that the words I am using recall others with a similar sound...or that familiar associations branch off from them (emphasis copied from original)".

Timpanaro later reignited the debate, by maintaining that any given slip can always be explained mechanically without a need for deeper motivation.

J. L. Austin had independently seen slips not as revealing a particular complex, but as an ineluctable feature of the human condition, necessitating a continual preparation for excuses and remedial work.

== See also ==
- Dittography
- Freudian slip
- Ivan Pavlov
- Latinism
- Speech error
- Plot hole
