= Error treatment (linguistics) =

How teachers respond to students' language errors

In second language acquisition, error treatment refers to the way teachers respond to learners' linguistic errors made in the course of learning a second language. Many error treatment studies seek to address issues like when, how, and by whom such errors should be corrected.

== Types ==
Craig Chaudron (1977) has pointed out four types of treatment:

- Treatment that creates an autonomous ability in learners to correct themselves on any item
- Treatment that elicits a correct response from the learners
- Any reaction/treatment by a teacher that demands improvement
- Positive or negative reinforcement involving the expression of approval or disapproval

== Terminologies ==
A number of terms are used to discuss the various areas of error treatment, though the differences among these terms are very subtle.

=== Feedback ===
It has characteristics of constructive criticism which may be positive or negative usually from a more informed source.

=== Correction ===
In correcting errors, correction is a post-production exercise and basically deals with the linguistic errors. Often in the form of feedback, it draws learners' attention to the mistakes they have made and acts as a reminder of the correct form of language.

=== Repair ===
Errors that cause "communication difficulties" are likely to be "repaired" either by speaker or listener. The term repair, which includes correction, is an attempt to identify and correct the communication difficulties.

== Role of teachers and learners ==
The role of teachers and that of learners in correcting errors are of great importance. This tries to answer the question as to who should indicate and fix the error. The phenomenon is known as "self" and "other". Depending on who indicates and fixes the error either in conversation or in classroom, there can be four possible ways of error correction:

- self-initiated other-completed
- self-initiated self-completed
- other-initiated self-completed
- other-initiated other-completed

According to Van Lier (1988), in naturally occurring conversation, self-initiated and self-completed repair occurs while in teacher-dominated classroom, other-initiated and other-completed repair can be sought for.

== Description ==
Much of the studies on error treatment have focused on the following three issues:

- the type of errors that should be treated/corrected
- who performs the correction
- when and how corrections should be made

== See also ==
- Error (linguistics)
- Error analysis (linguistics)
- Second-language acquisition
