= Psychic determinism =

Psychic determinism is a type of determinism that theorizes that all mental processes are not spontaneous but are determined by the unconscious or preexisting mental complexes. It relies on the causality principle applied to psychic occurrences in which nothing happens by chance or by accidental arbitrary ways. It is one of the central concepts of psychoanalysis. Thus, slips of the tongue, forgetting an individual's name, and any other verbal associations or mistakes are assumed to have psychological meaning. Psychoanalytic therapists will generally probe clients and have them elaborate on why something "popped into" their head or why they may have forgotten someone's name rather than ignoring the material. The therapist then analyze this discussion for clues revealing unconscious connections to the slip of verbal association. Psychic determinism is related to the overarching concept of determinism, specifically in terms of human actions. Therapists who adhere to the belief in psychic determinism assume that human action and decisions are predetermined and are not necessarily under their own control.

== Origin ==
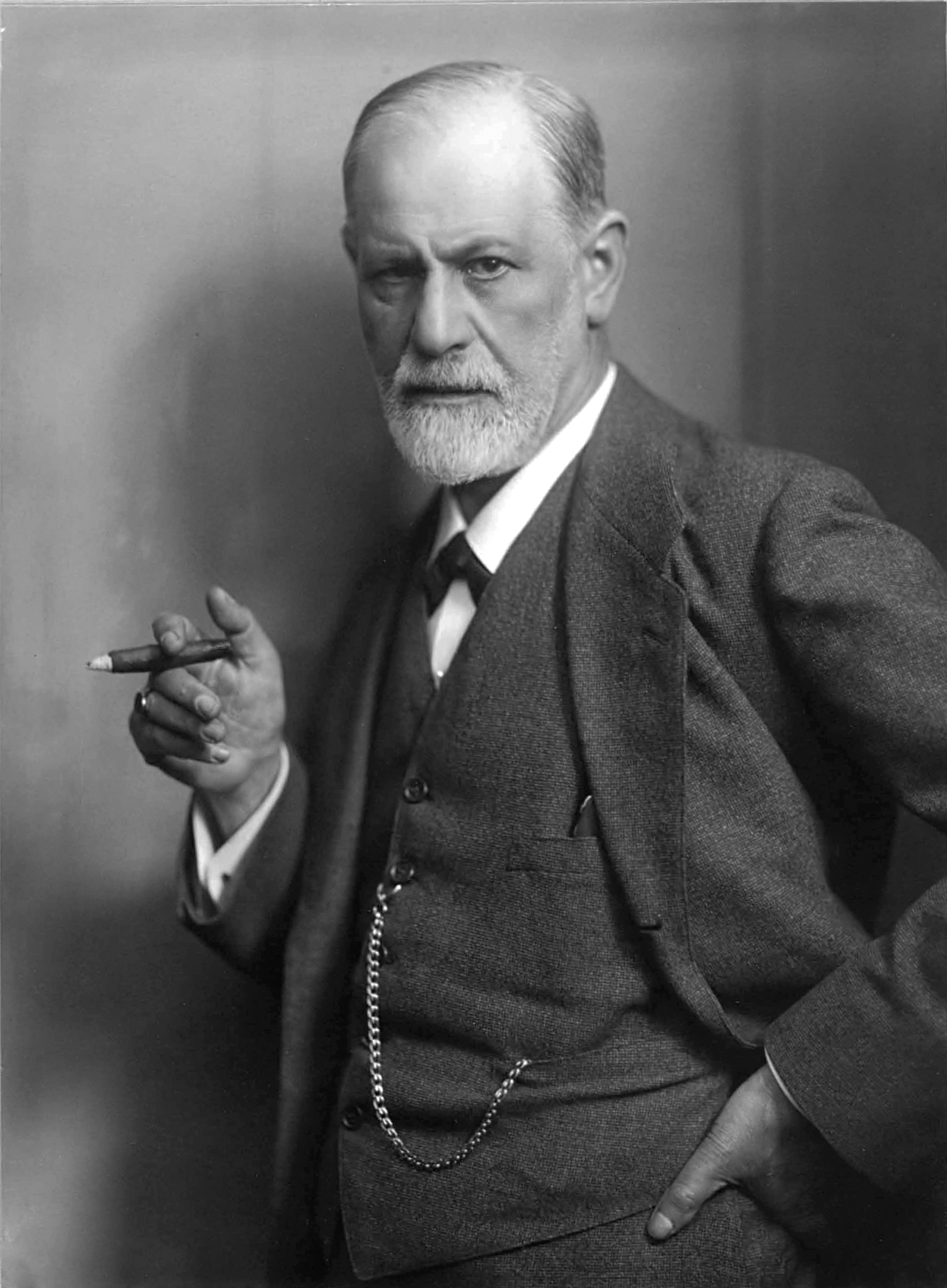
Sigmund Freud, by Max Halberstadt, 1921

In 1901 Sigmund Freud published The Psychopathology of Everyday Life in which he detailed the importance of generally trivial or overlooked details in therapy sessions. It was in this work that Freud began to use the term "Fehlleistungen" to refer to seemingly unintended slips of the tongue. Freud interpreted these slips of the tongue as the result of unconscious desires or impulses. During psychoanalytic therapy sessions Freud would dissect and question participants if they made a mental lapse or a slip of the tongue, as he believed this would allow him an understanding of the unconscious motives of his patient.

Although the "Freudian slip" is considered the most popularized example of psychic determinism from Freud's work, this concept of determinism is not the only one. The term psychic determinism encompasses other forms of mental lapses such as forgetting someone's name.

== Clinical setting ==
Psychic determinism was an extremely important feature of free association during psychoanalytic therapy, and still holds significance for many psychoanalysts today. Free association was developed by Sigmund Freud as an alternative to the hypnotic method for treating neurotic patients. During free association patients are encouraged to state whatever comes to their mind during the therapy session without censoring themselves. During free association the client may at times have an image come to mind or say something that seems odd or unintentional. Instead of overlooking this, the therapist would begin to delve into the slip and determine the underlying cause of it, which Freud claimed as generally some unconscious impulse. During psychoanalysis and free association the patient generally lies on a couch with the analyst sitting close but slightly out of view. The patient begins the session by reporting her thoughts as they come to her, no matter how illogical, bizarre, or base they may seem.

=== Example ===
==== Patient ====
"I am thinking of the fluffy clouds I seem to see with my very eyes. They are white and pearly. The sky is full of clouds but a few azure patches can still be seen here and there...

Clouds keep changing their shapes. They are fluid because they are condensed water particles...

I am thinking I may have an obsession about this water. The doctor has told me I am dehydrated; there's not enough water in my body. He suggested I should drink 2-3 liters of water every day. Mineral water or tea!

I thought there is a connection between my need to add salt to my food and thirst. My body has found itself a pretext - salty food - to make me drink more water. I have a lot of thoughts about the manifestations of my body, which seem logical and aim at inner balance. Everybody has in fact got an inner physician in oneself. What need is there of an outside doctor then? If you allow yourself lie at the will of your free inclinations, with no assumptions whatsoever, you will have the intuition of making things that may surprise you, nevertheless useful to your body and securing your health and high spirits. I read somewhere that one can be one's own doctor... Everybody can be one's own doctor."

==== Therapist analysis ====
"We put a stop here to the flow of our patient's associations. We may notice these are indirectly related to the relationship with her therapist. Her associations related to the spontaneous medicine of her body lead to the idea that no physician is in fact necessary. The patient thinks the psychoanalyst has in fact no contribution to her well being, that she could very well do without one.

We must admit the series of free associations produced by the patient are somehow related to her present circumstances, including a recent reality: her psychoanalytic therapy. The novelty of the therapy, the relationship with the psychoanalyst, automatically induces thoughts, remarks, more or less recent memories. The fact that, during her therapy, the patient alludes to a doctor, who had in fact done nothing to help her, is no mere chance. This memory can be related to the present circumstance and it may be translated in the patient's skepticism concerning the utility of this analytic therapy.

Nevertheless, this skepticism has an even older history, bringing to the fore the patient's relationship to her mother, when still a child, and dependent on her parents' support."

=== Criticisms ===
Criticism of free association is generally not on the clinical evidence, but the clinical data and the suggestion that they might be a patient's responses to the suggestions and expectations of the analyst rather than evidence of subconscious thought. Also there is concern that there is no way of ensuring that the analyst is capable of distinguishing between the patients' actual memories and imagined memories constructed due to the influence of the analyst's leading questions. Because of this, it is believed that this approach can cause harm to the patients mental state.

Case Example 1: Elisa

Elisa claimed to have been sexually victimized by a neighbor when she was between 14 and 18 years of age. She maintained she repressed all memories of this abuse until her therapist questioned her about the possibility. After developing the memories, she sued the neighbor, who denied the abuse.

Elisa came from a troubled and conflicted family and perceived her family as nonsupportive. After high school she worked as a secretary and attended community college part-time. She met her future husband when she was 18 and they were married two years later. Her life was complicated by rheumatoid arthritis which, although not life-threatening, was painful and difficult, and she was eventually hospitalized for depression. At the time we saw her she had had a total of five hospitalizations for emotional problems. The hospital records mention her anger and frustration over the chronic pain along with problems with her marriage and with her family, particularly her mother. But until three years ago she was employed and going to school part-time.

Elisa began seeing Dr. Smith three years ago. Dr. Smith's case notes indicate that he questioned her a number of times about abuse and that she initially denied it. But he believed she had the symptoms of sexual abuse, so he persisted questioning her until she eventually agreed that her neighbor had "touched" her. She didn't have many memories of this at first, but after a few months she had "flashbacks," and "frightening things" came into her mind. She eventually recovered memories of her neighbor regularly grabbing her and kissing and fondling her when her parents were at work. She claimed that the abuse went on for four years until shortly before she met her future husband, but she claimed to have no memory of it until Dr. Smith began questioning her.

Elisa saw Dr. Smith, who also managed her medications, three times a week and was on a large number of mood-altering drugs. She became progressively more dysfunctional until she was unable to work. She spent most days in bed, except when she was at therapy, while her husband did the house cleaning, shopping, cooking, and laundry. Her inability to cope with these tasks was due to her emotional problems rather than her physical ones, which were currently under control.

Dr. Smith diagnosed her as multiple personality disorder and had this diagnosis confirmed by an MPD "expert" in a nearby city. It was hard for Elisa to accept that she had MPD and she denied it until Dr. Smith told her, "there was no doubt that I had multiple personalities." Eventually she developed seven different personalities and believed that her MPD resulted from the abuse by her neighbor.

Elisa reported that she screams, shouts and throws and breaks things when she is angry and that she has one personality who is very violent. She said that the multiple personalities were a coping mechanism for when she is in a difficult or stressful situation. Dr. Smith's case notes indicate that the alters appeared regularly in their therapy sessions. She hallucinated monsters in the form of a man who was following her. She became frightened and hid and then "Chrissy" came out. She also heard voices that said bad things about her. When this happened, "Judy" came out and punished her by cutting her arms and her legs. She said, "I don't cut, Judy cuts."

Criticism of the case

During our evaluation, Elisa was appropriate and cooperative. RU spoke to her for four hours and at no time did she display any sign of cognitive slippage, delusions or hallucinations, irrational behavior, or changing personalities. This was despite the stress of the evaluation. She also reported seeing the neighbor in a parking lot at lunch time, but no alters emerged to protect her from either RU or the neighbor.

Elisa's psychological test results indicated significant exaggeration of problems. We interpreted this as a learned response to therapy and her hospitalizations rather than deliberate malingering. She was told that she had severe psychological problems, including MPD, and she learned to play the role of a disturbed and dysfunctional MPD patient, especially when around people who expected this from her. After therapy three times a week, several hospitalizations, and constant talking about how the personalities helped her cope and how the abuse damaged her permanently, this became her reality."
