= Error analysis (linguistics) =

Approach in linguistics

In linguistics, an error is the use of a word, speech act or grammatical items in such a way that it seems imperfect and significant of an incomplete learning. It is as a systematic deviation which happens when a learner has not learnt something, and consistently gets it wrong, but the attempts made to put that error into context have always gone hand in hand with either the language learning or second-language acquisition process. Errors are ‘signals’ that indicate an actual learning process taking place and that the learner has not yet mastered or shown a well-structured competence in the target language.

All the definitions seem to stress either the systematic deviations triggered in the language learning process, or its indications of the actual situation of the language learner themselves, which will later help monitoring. This monitoring can later help an applied linguist or particularly the language teacher to solve the problem. The occurrence of errors therefore not only indicates that the learner has not learned something yet, but also gives the linguist an idea of whether the teaching method applied was effective or needs to be changed.

Errors signify three things: first to the teacher, in that the learner tells the teacher, if they have undertaken a systematic analysis, how far towards that goal the learner has progressed and, consequently, what remains for them to learn; second, they provide the researcher with evidence of how language is learned or acquired, and what strategies or procedures the learner is employing in their discovery of the language; third, they are indispensable to the learner themselves, because the making of errors can be regarded as a device the learner uses in order to learn. The occurrence of errors is merely a sign of "the present inadequacy of our teaching methods".

There have been two schools of thought when it comes to error analysis and philosophy; the first one linked the error commitment with the teaching method, arguing that if the teaching method was adequate, the errors would not be committed; the second believed that we live in an imperfect world, that error correction is something real, and the applied linguist cannot do without it no matter what teaching approach they may use.

== Errors versus mistakes ==
In 1965, Noam Chomsky made a distinguishing explanation of competence and performance, on the basis of which, later on, the identification of mistakes and errors were possible. Chomsky also stated that "We thus make a fundamental distinction between competence (the speaker-hearer's knowledge of his language) and performance (the actual use of language in concrete situations)". In other words, errors are thought of as indications of an incomplete learning, and that the speaker or hearer has not yet accumulated a satisfied language knowledge which can enable them to avoid linguistics misuse. Relating knowledge with competence was significant enough to represent that the competence of the speaker is judged by means of errors that concern the amount of linguistic data they have been exposed to, however, performance which is the actual use of language does not represent the language knowledge that the speaker has. People may have the competence to produce an infinitely long sentence but when they actually attempt to use this knowledge (to “perform”) there are many reasons why they restrict the number of adjectives, adverbs, and clauses in any one sentence.

The actual state of the speaker somehow involves and influences the speaker's performance by either causing a good performance or mistakes. Thus, it is quite obvious that there is some kind of interrelationship between competence and performance; somehow, a speaker can perform well if they have had already satisfied linguistic knowledge. Mistakes are of no significance to "the process of language learning".

== Error analysis approach ==
Before the rise of error analysis approach (EA), in the 1950s, contrastive analysis had been the dominant approach used in conceptualizing and dealing with the learners’ errors. This approach had often gone hand in hand with concept of L1 Interference and precisely the interlingual effect, and claimed that the main cause of committing errors in the process of second language learning is the L1. Put simply: The linguistic background of the language learners badly affects the production in the target language or second language.

The contrastive analysis hypothesis claims that the principal barrier to second language acquisition is the interference of the first language system with the second language system, and that a scientific, structural comparison of the two languages in question would enable people to predict and describe which are problems and which are not. Error analysis approach overwhelmed and announced the decline of the contrastive analysis hypothesis, which was only effective in phonology. EA developed as a branch of Linguistics in the 1960s and it came to light to argue that the mother tongue was not the main and the only source of the errors committed by the learners. In addition, the language effect is more complex, and these errors can be caused even by the target language itself, or by the applied communicative strategies, as well as the type and quality of the second language instructions.

The aim of EA is first, to identify strategies which learners use in language learning, in terms of the approaches and strategies used in both of teaching and learning. Second, to try to identify the causes of learners’ errors, that is, investigating the motives behind committing such errors as the first attempt to eradicate them. Third, to obtain information on common difficulties in Language Learning, as an aid to teaching, or in the preparation of the teaching materials.

The two major causes of error, as coined by the error analysis approach, are the Interlingual error, which is an error made by the learner's linguistic background and native language interference, and the Intralingual error which is the error committed by the learners when they misuse some Target Language rules, considering that the error cause lies within and between the target language itself and the learners false application of certain target language rules.

Error analysis in SLA was established in the 1960s by P. Corder and colleagues. It was an alternative to contrastive analysis, an approach influenced by behaviorism through which applied linguists sought to use the formal distinctions between the learners' first and second languages to predict errors. Error analysis showed that contrastive analysis was unable to predict a great majority of errors, although its more valuable aspects have been incorporated into the study of language transfer. A key finding of error analysis has been that many learner errors are produced by learners making faulty inferences about the rules of the new language.

Error analysts distinguish between errors, which are systematic, and mistakes, which are not. They often seek to develop a typology of errors. Error can be classified according to basic type: omissive, additive, substitutive or related to word order. They can be classified by how apparent they are: overt errors such as "I angry" are obvious even out of context, whereas covert errors are evident only in context. Closely related to this is the classification according to domain, the breadth of context which the analyst must examine, and extent, the breadth of the utterance which must be changed in order to fix the error. Errors may also be classified according to the level of language: phonological errors, vocabulary or lexical errors, syntactic errors, and so on. They may be assessed according to the degree to which they interfere with communication: global errors make an utterance difficult to understand, while local errors do not. In the above example, "I angry" would be a local error, since the meaning is apparent.

From the beginning, error analysis was beset with methodological problems. In particular, the above typologies are problematic: from linguistic data alone, it is often impossible to reliably determine what kind of error a learner is making. Also, error analysis can deal effectively only with learner production (speaking and writing) and not with learner reception (listening and reading). Furthermore, it cannot account for learner use of communicative strategies such as avoidance, in which learners simply do not use a form with which they are uncomfortable. For these reasons, although error analysis is still used to investigate specific questions in SLA, the quest for an overarching theory of learner errors has largely been abandoned. In the mid-1970s, Corder and others moved on to a more wide-ranging approach to learner language, known as interlanguage.

Error analysis is closely related to the study of error treatment in language teaching. Today, the study of errors is particularly relevant for focus on form teaching methodology.

In second language acquisition, error analysis studies the types and causes of language errors. Errors are classified according to:

- modality (i.e., level of proficiency in speaking, writing, reading, listening)
- linguistic levels (i.e., pronunciation, grammar, vocabulary, style)
- form (e.g., omission, insertion, substitution)
- type (systematic errors/errors in competence vs. occasional errors/errors in performance)
- cause (e.g., interference, interlanguage)
- norm vs. system

== Types of errors ==
Linguists have always been attempting to describe the types of errors committed by language learners, as it helps out the applied linguist to identify where the problem lies. Errors take place when the learner changes the surface structure in a particularly systematic manner, thus, the error, no matter what form and type it is, represent a damage at the level of the target language production.

Errors have been classified into two categories. The Interlingual Error and the Intralingual Error, those two elements refer respectively to the negative influence of both the speaker's native language, and the target language itself.

Interlingual error is caused by the interference of the native language L1 (also known as interference, linguistic interference, and crosslinguistic influence), whereby the learner tends to use their linguistic knowledge of L1 on some Linguistic features in the target language. This often leads to making errors. One example of this is the incorrect French sentence "Elle regarde les" ("She sees them"), produced according to the word order of English, instead of the correct French sentence "Elle les regarde" (Literally, "She them sees"). This example shows the type of errors aroused by the negative effect of the native language interference.

Intralingual error is an error that takes place due to a misuse of a particular rule of the target language, it is, in fact, quite the opposite of Interlingual error, as it puts the target language into focus: The target language is the cause for the error. Furthermore, it is considered as one which results from "faulty or partial" learning of the target language. Thus, intralingual errors are classified as follows:

Overgeneralizations: overgeneralization errors occur when the speaker applies a grammatical rule in cases where it doesn’t apply. They are caused "by extension of target language rules to inappropriate context.". This kind of errors have been committed while dealing with regular and irregular verbs, as well as the application of plural forms. E.g. (Tooth == Tooths rather than teeth) and (he goes == he goed rather than went).

Simplifications: result from learners producing simpler linguistic forms than those found in the target language, in other words, learners attempt to be linguistically creative and produce their own poetic sentences/utterances. This may sometimes be successful, but not necessary. Corder (as cited in Mahmoud 2014:276) mentioned that learners do not have the complex system which they could simplify. This kind of error, then, is committed through both omission and addition of some linguistic elements at the level of either the spelling or grammar. A. Mahmoud (2014) provided examples based on a research conducted on written English of Arabic-speaking second year University students:

1. Spelling: omission of silent letters:
  - no (= know) * dout (= doubt) * weit (weight)
2. Grammar:
  1. Omission:
    - We wait ^ the bus all the time.
    - He was ^ clever and has ^ understanding father.
  2. Addition:
    - Students are do their researches every semester.
    - Both the boys and the girls they can study together.

Developmental errors: are, in a sense, part of the overgeneralizations, and are the results of normal pattern of development, such as (come = comed) and (break = breaked). Developmental errors indicate that the learner has started developing their linguistic knowledge, but fails to reproduce the rules they have lately been exposed to in the target language.

Induced errors or transfer of training errors: are caused by misleading teaching examples. Teachers sometimes unconditionally explain a rule without highlighting the exceptions or the intended message they would want to convey. One example, that occurs at the level of teaching prepositions, is one where the teacher may hold up a box and say "I am looking at the box". The students may then understand that "at" means "under", and later utter "the cat is at the table" instead of "the cat is under the table".

Errors of avoidance: these errors occur when the learner fail to apply certain target language rules just because they are thought of to be too difficult.

Errors of overproduction: in the early stages of language learning, learners are supposed to have not yet acquired and accumulated a sufficient linguistic knowledge to use the finite rules of the target language in order to produce infinite structures. Most of the time this leads beginners to overproduce, such that they frequently repeat a particular structure.

== Steps ==
According to linguist S.P. Corder, the following are the steps in any typical EA research:

1. collecting samples of learner language
2. identifying the errors
3. describing the errors
4. explaining the errors
5. evaluating/correcting the errors

collection of errors: the nature and quantity of errors is likely to vary depending on whether the data consists of natural, spontaneous language use, or careful, elicited language use.

The two kinds of elicitation, clinical and experimental, differ as in that clinical elicitation involves getting the informant to produce data of any sort, for example by means of general interview or writing a composition, while experimental elicitation involves the use of special instrument to elicit data containing the linguistic features, such as, for example, a series of pictures which had been designed to elicit the features.

== Bibliography ==
- Anefnaf, Z. ( 2017) English Learning: Linguistic flaws, Sais Faculty of Arts and Humanities, USMBA, Retrieved from https://www.academia.edu/33999467/English_Learning_in_Morocco_Linguistic_Flaws
- Chomsky, N. (1965). Aspects of the theory of syntax. Cambridge, MA: MIT Press. p. 4
- Chomsky, N. (1956). Three models for the description of language, IEEE. p. 4
- Corder, S.P. (1967). the significance of learner's errors. International Review of Applied Linguistics, pp. 160-170
- Corder, S.P. (1976). The notions of simplification, interlanguages and pidgins and their relation to second language pedagogy: actes du 5ème Colloque de linguistique appliquée de Neuchâtel. Institut de linguistique de l'Université. pp. 163 & 167
- Corder, S.P. (1973). Introducing Applied Linguistics. London: Penguin Books
- Dulay, H., Burt, M., & Krashen, S.D. (1982). Language two. New York: Oxford University Press. p. 150
- Edje, J (1989). Mistakes and Correction. London: Longman. p. 26
- Ellis, R. (1994). The Study of Second Language Acquisition, Oxford University Press, p. 48, Retrieved from https://books.google.com/books?id=3KglibyrZ5sC&pg=PA48
- Fang, X. & Xue-mei, J. (2007). Error analysis and the EFL classroom teaching: US-China education review, 4(9), pp. 10–14.
- Hashim, A. (1999). Crosslinguistic influence in the written English of Malay undergraduates: Journal of Modern Languages, 12, (1), pp. 59–76.
- Hendrickson, J.M. (1987). Error correction in foreign language teaching: Recent theory, research, and practice. In M.H. Long & J.C. Richards (Eds.). Methodology in TESOL: A book of readings. Boston: Heinle & Heinle. p. 357
- Norrish, J. (1983). Language learners and their errors. London: Macmillan Press. p. 7
- Richards, J. C. & Schmidt, R. (2002). Dictionary of language teaching and applied linguistics (3rd Ed.). London: Longman.
- Richards, J. C., & Rodgers T. S.(2001). Approaches and Methods in Language Teaching. (2nd edition), Cambridge University Press: Cambridge, UK. p. 153
- Bußmann, H. (1996). Routledge Dictionary of Language and Linguistics, London: Routledge, s.v. error analysis. A comprehensive bibliography was published by Bernd Spillner (1991), Error Analysis, Amsterdam/Philadelphia: Benjamins

== See also ==
- Error (linguistics)
- Error treatment (linguistics)
- Second language acquisition
