= Laudative =

Terms conveying positivity

Laudatives (from Latin laudare "to praise") are words or grammatical forms that denote a positive affect. That is, they express praise or approval on the part of the speaker.

The Spanish augmentative suffix -azo has laudative uses, such as cuerpazo "great body", though it also has pejorative uses such as cabronazo "major asshole."

Mansi has a suffix -ke that functions as both a diminutive and a laudative, as in saalike "good little reindeer", lowke X "ten good X", totike "he carries (it) with pleasure".

Laudatory words are rare in English compared to pejorative ones, though there are a few, such as "steed" for a fine horse. More common is laudative use of metaphor, such as calling a helpful person a "saint" or fine food "ambrosia". Intonation may convey a laudative affect, as in "What a house!" said with an air of wonder.
