= Dream speech =

Words in the mind during sleep

Dream speech (German: Traumsprache) is speech that occurs internally during a dream. The term was coined by Emil Kraepelin in his 1906 monograph On Language Disturbances in Dreams. The text discussed various forms of dream speech, outlining 286 examples. Dream speech is not to be confounded with the 'language of dreams', which refers to the visual means of representing thought in dreams. (Note: For the language of dreams see Wilhelm Stekel Die Sprache des Traums (1911))

Kraepelin considered three types of dream speech: disorders of word-selection (also called paraphasias), disorders of discourse (e.g., agrammatisms), and thought disorders. The most frequently occurring form of dream speech is a neologism. While Kraepelin was interested in the psychiatric and psychological aspects of dream speech, modern researchers have focused on speech production in dreams as an illuminating window into cognition in the dreaming mind. Some have found that during dream speech, Wernicke's area is not functioning well, whereas Broca's area is, resulting in proper grammar but little meaning.

== Emil Kraepelin ==
Emil Kraepelin (1856-1926) was a German psychiatrist who studied dream speech as a means of understanding language disturbances seen in schizophrenia, stating in 1920 that "dream speech in every detail corresponds to schizophrenic speech disorder". Kraepelin presented 286 examples of dream speech in his monograph, the majority of which are of his own. After 1906, he continued to collect samples of dream speech until he died in 1926. This time, the dream speech specimens were almost exclusively his own, and the original handwritten dream texts are still available today at the Archive of the Max Planck Institute of Psychiatry in Munich. These new dream-speech specimens were published in 1993 in Heynick (in part in English translation) and in 2006 in the original German, with numerous notes added. The second dream corpus has not been censored, and dates are added to the dreams.

Blirr-Blerr (dream speech, May 1908)	Psychische Krankheiten, die plötzlich (blitzschnell) hereinbrechen. Als besonders prägnante und glückliche Neubildung aufgefasst. Absicht der Frau mitzuteilen deswegen.

As Kraepelin had been collecting dream speech since 1906, he jotted down his dream speech specimens for more than 40 years, with a scientific viewpoint in mind. Kraepelin's dream speech started during a period (1882–1884) of personal crisis and depression. In 1882, Kraepelin was fired after working only a few weeks at the Leipzig psychiatric clinic, and two months later, his father died.

=== Schizophrenic speech disorder ===
Kraepelin had been confronted with a schizophrenic speech disorder—first called Sprachverwirrtheit, then schizophrene Sprachverwirrtheit, and finally Schizophasie—produced by his patients. But, as Kraepelin states, the schizophasia can hardly be studied, because what the patient is trying to express is unknown; however, using the classical dream-psychosis analogy, he tried to first study dream speech in the hope that this would lead to insights into schizophrenic speech disorder. And so Kraepelin got into recording his dreams, not to interpret them for personal use, as in psychoanalysis, but to use them for scientific study. Kraepelin was not only able to record the deviant speech in his dreams, but also the intended utterance (which was lacking in the deviant speech of his patients, who clearly cannot cross the boundary from psychosis to reality). For example, most neologisms (the deviant utterance) in Kraepelin's dreams have a meaning (the intended utterance).

=== Neurology ===
Kraepelin pointed out that the fundamental disturbances underlying dream speech were diminished functioning of Wernicke's area and those frontal areas in which abstract reasoning is localized. Therefore, individual ideas (Individualvorstellungen) are expressed in dreams rather than general ideas. Among these individual ideas, he included proper names in their widest sense.

== Other researchers ==
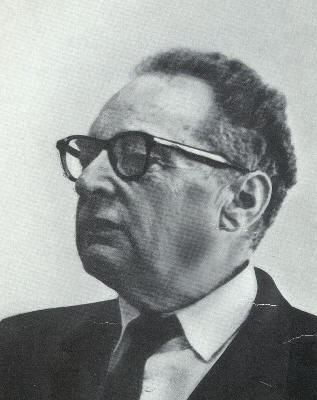
Roman Jakobson

Kraepelin's daughter, Toni Schmidt-Kraepelin, also a psychiatrist, collected eight examples of dream speech in her 1920 work. Sigmund Freud gave a few neologism examples in his 1899 The Interpretation of Dreams, and Havelock Ellis mentioned two specimens in his 1911 The World of Dreams, briefly discussing Kraepelin's theory. In 1941, the linguist Roman Jakobson discussed Kraepelin's monograph and contributed one important example to dream speech. In his dream, the Czech word 'zemřel' (died) transformed into 'seme'; according to Jakobson, this was because the liquids l and r disappeared. In this example, Jakobson wanted to show that, in his deep sleep, Broca's area did not function properly. This would be a counter-example to Kraepelin's theory that only the Wernicke area is affected during dream speech.

Jakobson presupposes that seme is meaningless and is directly related to zemřel without any intermediate associations. However, there may be another explanation, conforming to Kraepelin's theory, of Jakobson's example if a perfectly fitting associative chain can be found linking zemřel to seme indirectly. Note that seme is a meaningful part of Kraepelin's dream speech specimen 49 in which par-seme-nie is supposed to be Russian for some weeks. Jakobson, born in Russia, may have been intrigued by parsemenie and may have used it in his own dream. In another example of Kraepelin's dream speech (no. 113), the Czech letter ř appears in the name of the Czech village Příbram. It may also have influenced Jakobson, a former member of the Prague linguistic circle, in his zemřel-dream.

=== Cryptanalysis ===
For the cryptanalysis of Kraepelin's dream speech, a special method has been developed, applicable to the dream speech of others as well. The aim of reconstruction of associative chains is to achieve precise linking, use relevant contextual information, and keep chains as short as possible. Associations in the chain can be synonyms, sometimes in a foreign language, and word-form associations. Of particular importance are so-called idiosyncratic associations, peculiar to a specific individual (here, the dreamer). Partial chains, built starting from both the dream-speech specimen and its meaning (already provided by the dreamer), should meet in the middle without any discrepancy.

=== Chaika and Fromkin ===
Debating on the nature of disorganized speech in schizophrenia in the 1970s, linguist Elaine Chaika argued it to be an intermittent form of aphasia, while Victoria Fromkin stated that schizophrenic speech errors could also occur in "normals". Chaika later changed her mind:

I no longer think that error in [schizophrenic] speech disorder should be necessarily equated with the aphasias which result from actual brain damage.

Chaika added:

The interpretation of meaning of such speech can be quite different according to whether it is perceived as resulting from a true deficit in language production as opposed to resulting from failed intention.

Chaika compares schizophrenic speech errors with intricate speech errors that are difficult to analyze. Chaika's position comes close to Kraepelin's, who noted that errors, as in schizophasia, can also occur in normals during dreams.

== Cognitive dream speech research ==
At first sight, dream speech plays only a marginal role in dream theory. However, the important connection of dream and speech is very well illustrated by the following statement of David Foulkes: "However visual dreaming may seem, it may be planned and regulated by the human speech production system."

Recent research has confirmed one of Kraepelin's fundamental disturbances. In the book The Committee of Sleep, Harvard psychologist Deirdre Barrett describes examples of dreamed literature in which the dreamers heard or read words that they later wrote and published. She observes that almost all the examples are of poetry rather than prose or fiction, the only exceptions being one- or several-word phrases such as the book title Vanity Fair, which came to Thackeray in a dream, or, similarly, Katherine Mansfield's Sun and Moon. Barrett suggests that the reason poetry fares better in dreams is that grammar seems to be well preserved in dream language while meaning suffers, and rhyme and rhythm are more prominent than when awake—all characteristics which benefit poetry but not other forms.

In other work, Barrett has studied verbatim language in college students' dreams and found similar characteristics—intact grammar, poor meaning, rhythm, and rhyme—to the literary examples. She suggested this was indicative of reduced activity in Wernicke's area but not Broca's; the language resembles that of patients with Wernicke's aphasia, which is essentially the same conclusion Kraepelin reached in 1906. Linguist Patricia Kilroe, in her survey of 500 dreams, did not find poor meaning in dream speech but rather discovered that "In both structure and content, much of dream speech may pass for waking speech, although generally in shorter and simpler utterance forms. Even the oddities of dream speech, such as neologisms and nonsense statements, occur in waking discourse, either as unintentional errors or as intentional products of the creative use of language". While Wernicke's area and Broca's area are implicated in dream speech, verbal activity in dreams is not isolated to the brain. Though reduced in amplitude, motor impulses to facial and lingual muscles accompany dream speech and dreamed conversations. Such muscle potentials can be detected with electromyography, and to an extent, decoded and reconstructed as audio speech.

== Elyn Saks ==
In her book The Center Cannot Hold, Elyn Saks gives several examples of word salad arising during psychotic episodes. But an explanation or helping intervention by her therapists seems lacking. Instead, new antipsychotics are recommended each time. There is a striking resemblance between an aspect of dream 51 in Kraepelin's monograph and a psychosis of Saks arising because she received a memo, a generally very good (that is, not excellent) from her professor Bob Cover.

In dream 51, the strange phrase tripap=3 can be explained by reading pap as a rebus p-a-p, that is, p without p, thereby eliminating pap from tripap and leaving tri=3, a true statement, because tri is Russian for 3. Understanding the rebus and recognizing that, in his dream, Kraepelin is concentrating on letters is essential here. Equally, looking at the first name Bob at the letters, a logical expression 'B or B' goes hidden, once the middle 'o' is interpreted as the Spanish word for 'or'. Now B is an academic mark of the second-highest standard (after an A). The first name of her professor is thus linked with an academic mark and the attention for this name, then leads to the first names Elyn and Ronna of Saks, explaining the start of her psychotic episode, soon leading to her remarking that there are no no's (compare an no in Ronna) in a law book and reciting in Greek from Aristotle, the father of logic.

== See also ==
- Kraepelin on Freud's Signorelli parapraxis
- Kraepelin on the neologism schizophrenia.
- Jakobson contra Kraepelin
- Blirr-Blerr: Kraepelin's alternative name for 'schizophrenia'
- Personal names in dichotic listening tasks
- Schizophasia
- Intrapersonal communication
- Somniloquy, a parasomnia in which a person physically speaks while asleep

== Basic publications ==
- Engels, Huub (2006). Emil Kraepelins Traumsprache 1908–1926. Wageningen: Ponsen & Looijen. ISBN 978-90-6464-060-5
- Heynick, F. (1993). Language and its disturbances in dreams: the pioneering work of Freud and Kraepelin updated. New York: Wiley.
- Kraepelin, E. (1906). Über Sprachstörungen im Traume. Leipzig: Engelmann.
