= Approbative =

Words or grammatical forms that denote positive affects

In linguistics, approbatives are words or grammatical forms that denote a positive affect; that is, they express the appreciation or approval of the speaker. !Claro! (Spanish) and "Gotcha!" (English) are examples.

Sometimes a term may begin as a pejorative word and eventually be adopted in an approbative sense. In historical linguistics, this phenomenon is known as amelioration. Examples from English include "punk", "nerd", "badass", "sick", and "killer".

== See also ==
- Laudative, or praising affect
- Pejorative, or negative affect
