= Sebastiano Timpanaro =

Italian philologist (1923–2000)

Sebastiano Timpanaro

Sebastiano Timpanaro (September 5, 1923 in Parma – November 26, 2000 in Florence) was an Italian classical philologist, essayist, and literary critic. He was also a long-time Marxist who made important contributions to left-wing political causes. He was an atheist.

== Selected publications ==
- La filologia di Giacomo Leopardi (1955)
- La genesi del metodo del Lachmann (1963)
- Classicismo e illuminismo nell'Ottocento italiano (1965)
- Sul materialismo (1970)
- Il lapsus freudiano: psicanalisi e critica testuale (1974)
- Contributi di filologia e di storia della lingua latina (1978)
- Aspetti e figure della cultura ottocentesca (1980)
- Antileopardiani e neomoderati nella sinistra italiana (1982)
- Il socialismo di Edmondo De Amicis: lettura del "Primo maggio" (1984)
- Per la storia della filologia virgiliana antica (1986)
- La fobia romana e altri scritti su Freud e Meringer, a cura di C.A. Madrignani, ETS (1992)
- La fobia romana e altri scritti su Freud e Meringer, a cura di A. Pagnini, ETS (2006)
- Nuovi contributi di filologia e storia della lingua latina (1994)
- Nuovi studi sul nostro Ottocento (1995)
- Virgilianisti antichi e tradizione indiretta (2001; posthumous)
- Il verde e il rosso: scritti militanti, 1966-2000 (2001; posthumous)

=== English translations ===
- On materialism (Lawrence Garner, tr., 1975)
- The Freudian slip: psychoanalysis and textual criticism (Kate Soper, tr., 1976)
- The genesis of Lachmann's method (Glenn W. Most, ed. and tr., 2005)
- "The Pessimistic Materialism of Giacomo Leopardi". New Left Review; I/116, July–August 1979: 29–50.
- "Considerations of Materialism". New Left Review; I/85 May/June 1974: 3-22.

== See also ==
- Giacomo Leopardi
- Karl Lachmann
- Sigmund Freud
- Signorelli parapraxis
- Edmondo De Amicis
- Rudolf Meringer
- Italian Socialist Party
- Italian Socialist Party of Proletarian Unity
