= Pit Corder =

English linguist

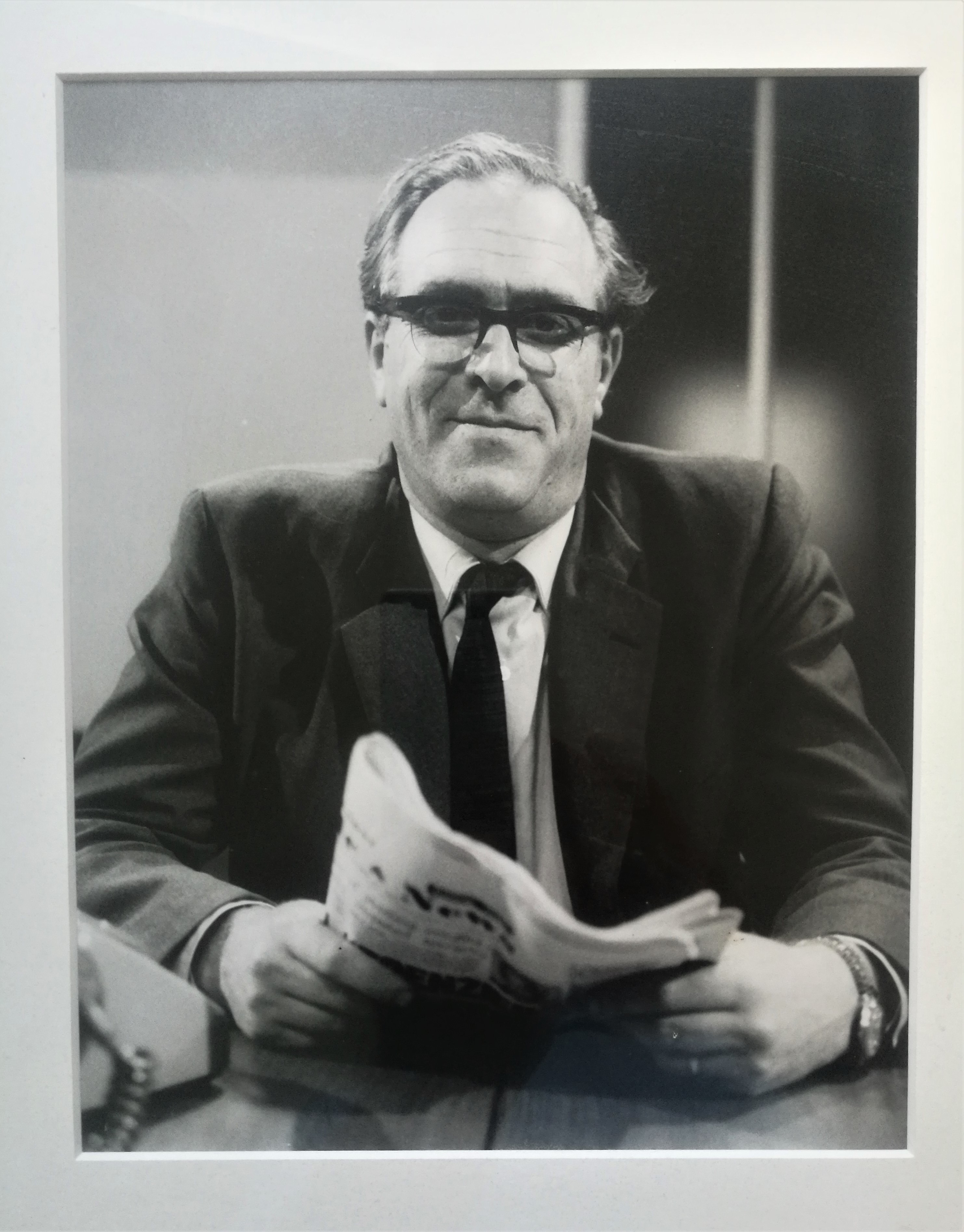
Pit Corder

Stephen Pit Corder (6 October 1918 – 27 January 1990) was a professor of applied linguistics at Edinburgh University, known for his contribution to the study of error analysis. He was the first Chair of the British Association for Applied Linguistics, 1967–70, and was instrumental in developing the field of applied linguistics in the United Kingdom.

== Early life ==
Pit Corder was born at 4 Bootham Terrace, York, into a Quaker family. His father, Philip Corder (b. 1885), was a schoolteacher of English origin, and his mother, Johanna Adriana van der Mersch (b. 1887), was Dutch. Pit studied at Bootham School, a Quaker boarding school near York, where his father was a master. He went on to read modern languages at Merton College, Oxford, from 1936 to 1939.

After Oxford, Corder taught at Great Ayton Friends' School until serving in the Friends' Ambulance Unit during World War II in Finland and Egypt, having received exemption from military service as a conscientious objector. In 1946 he married Nancy Procter (b. 1916), his second cousin, with whom he had two sons and a daughter.

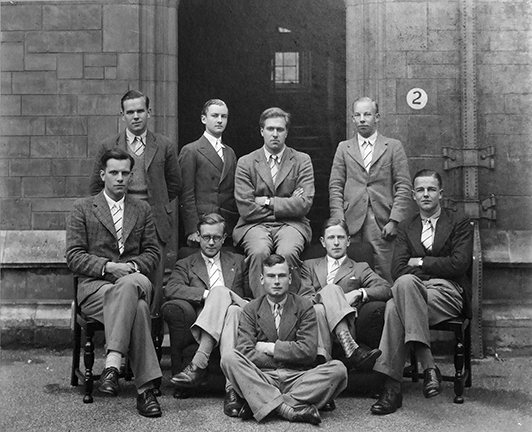
The Merton College rowing team 'The Second VIII'. Pit Corder is seen here third from left on back row.

== Career ==
After the war, Corder worked for the British Council in Austria, Turkey, Jamaica and Colombia. During this time he taught classes, worked on syllabus design, and prepared new language-teaching materials. In 1957 Corder joined the school of applied linguistics at the University of Edinburgh, although he continued to be employed by the British Council. The British Council needed specialists in applied linguistics for its expansion around the world, and Corder studied for the diploma in applied linguistics in order to fulfil that need. After a year of study the British Council posted him to Nigeria, where he helped to develop English-language teaching materials for television.

Corder left the British Council after this, although sources disagree on exactly when. According to his obituary by the British Association for Applied Linguistics, he left the British Council in 1961, when he began teaching at Leeds University. However, according to his biography in the Oxford Dictionary of National Biography, he was seconded to Leeds by the British Council, and only left the organisation in 1964 when he became director of the school of applied linguistics at the University of Edinburgh. Corder stayed at the University of Edinburgh for the rest of his professional life. Corder established a Lectureship and Department of Applied Linguistics at Edinburgh in 1964.

Corder was the first president (1967–70) of the British Association for Applied Linguistics.

== Notable publications ==
Corder has produced multiple publications which have influenced the field of applied linguistics:

- Corder, S. P. (1960) An intermediate English practice book. Longman.
- Corder, S. P. (1967) "The significance of learner's errors." International Review of Applied Linguistics, 5: 161–170.
- Corder, S. P. (1973) Introducing applied linguistics. Penguin Education (at Google Books).
- Corder, S. P. (1981) Error Analysis and Interlanguage. Oxford University Press.

In Error Analysis and Interlanguage, Corder introduced the idea that the learning of a second or foreign language is developmental and can be studied by analysing the errors that learners make. These errors should be viewed as signs of positive language development rather than deficiencies. Corder's argument that learner language, later termed 'interlanguage' by Larry Selinker (1972), is a language in its own right is now generally accepted.
