= Signorelli parapraxis =

Concept in classical psychoanalysis

The Signorelli parapraxis represents the first and best known example of a parapraxis and its analysis in Freud's The Psychopathology of Everyday Life. The parapraxis centers on a word-finding problem and the production of substitutes. Freud could not recall the name (Signorelli) of the painter of the Orvieto frescos and produced as substitutes the names of two painters Botticelli and Boltraffio. Freud's analysis shows what associative processes had linked Signorelli to Botticelli and Boltraffio. The analysis has been criticised by linguists and others.

== Botticelli – Boltraffio – Trafoi ==
One important ingredient in Freud's analysis was the North-Italian village Trafoi where he received the message of the suicide of one of his patients, struggling with sexual problems. Without Trafoi the substitute Boltraffio associated to it would be incomprehensible. Freud links Trafoi to the theme death and sexuality, a theme preceding the word-finding problem in a conversation Freud had during a trip by train through Bosnia-Herzegovina.

The second important ingredient in Freud's analysis is the extraction of an Italian word signor from the forgotten name Signorelli. Herr, the German counterpart of Signor, is then linked to (Her)zegovina and the word Herr occurring, as Freud tells us, in the conversation. That country's Turks, he recalled, valued sexual pleasure highly, and he was told by a colleague that a patient once said to him: "For you know, sir (Herr) if that ceases, life no longer has any charm". Moreover, Freud argued that (Bo)snia linked (Bo)tticelli with (Bo)ltraffio and Trafoi. He concludes by saying: "We shall represent this state of affairs carefully enough if we assert that beside the simple forgetting of proper names there is another forgetting which is motivated by repression".

In a scheme Freud presented the associations he used for the explanation of his Signorelli parapraxis.

Freud denies the relevance of the content of the frescos. Nevertheless, psychoanalysts have pursued their investigations particularly into this direction, finding however no new explanation of the parapraxis. Jacques Lacan suggested that the parapraxis may be an act of self-forgetting. Art historian Nicholas Fox Weber suggests that Freud forgot the name because the muscular naked men whom Signorelli portrayed made Freud’s unassertive father look bad by comparison, that the muscular naked men brought out Freud’s repressed homosexual feelings, that Signorelli’s portrayal of a Jewish Antichrist made Freud uncomfortable with his Jewishness or with his rejection of his Jewishness, and that Signorelli’s frescoes caused Freud to feel shame for having slept with his wife’s sister Minna.

== Trafoi in Kraepelin's dream ==
The first critique to Freud came from Emil Kraepelin, who in a postscript to his 1906 monograph on language disturbances in dreams, relates a dream involving Trafoi. The dream centers around a neologism Trafei, which Kraepelin links to Trafoi. The dream may be seen as an implicit critique on Freud's analysis. Italian trofei is associated to Trafei in the same way as Trafoi and clarifies Kraepelin's dream. The meaning of trofei reads in German Siegeszeichen (victory-signs) and this German word together with Latin signum clearly links to Freud's first name.

Kraepelin's dream speech, spring 1906, p.104 of his monograph)	meaning and comment (on Trafei) by Kraepelin
Recht gut geworden sind die Zöglinge der alten und neuen Trafei.	Die Photogramme der Hirsche in zwei benachbarten, bestimmten Gehölze. Trafei, offenbar Anlehnung an Trafoi, ist eine willkürliche Neubildung an Stelle des wirklichen, völlig abweichenden Namen jener Gehölze.

== Sebastiano Timpanaro ==
In The Freudian Slip Sebastiano Timpanaro discusses Freud's analysis in chapter 6 "Love and Death at Orvieto." (pp. 63-81). He in fact doubts that the name Boltraffio would have played a major role during the parapraxis, as he states: "Boltraffio is a Schlimmbesserung [that is a substitute worse than another substitute]" and adds "the correction goes astray because of incapacity to localize the fault." (p. 71). He calls Botticelli an "involuntary banalization" and Boltraffio "a semi-conscious disimproved correction." (p. 75). As to the Signor-element in Freud's analysis he puts: "The immediate equivalence Signore= Herr is one thing, the extraction of signor from Signorelli and of Her(r) from Herzegowina is another."

== Swales' investigation ==
Peter J. Swales (2003) investigated the historical data and states that Freud probably visited an exposition of Italian masters in Bergamo mid-September 1898, showing paintings of Signorelli, Botticelli and Boltraffio one next to the other. In his view the paintings at the exposition were the source of the substitute names in the parapraxis. Swales dwells largely on the three paintings. The association of the name Boltraffio to the name Da Vinci, another hypothesis formulated by Swales (because Freud might have seen the statue of Boltraffio at the bottom of the Da Vinci monument on Piazza della Scala in Milan some days before his visit to Bergamo), is not further pursued by Swales. Although Freud visited Trafoi on the 8th of August 1898, Swales doubts whether Freud received a message on the suicide of one of his patients.

== Freud neglected his own observation ==
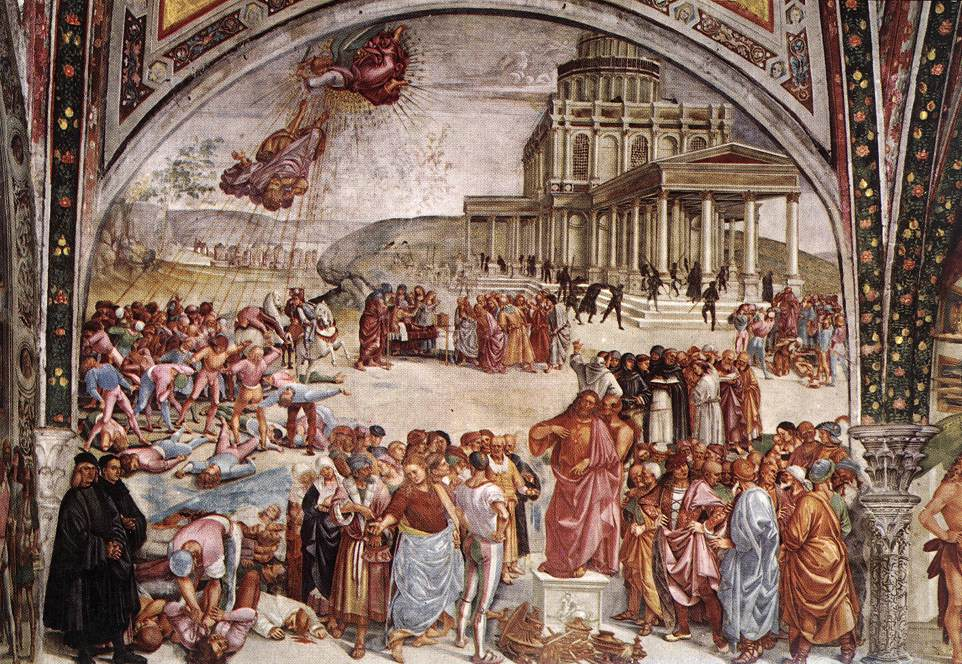
Fresco of the Deeds of the Antichrist

Freud in his analysis did not use the fact that he remembered very well a picture of the painter in the lower left corner of one of the frescos. The picture, sort of a signature, was thus a third substitute to the forgotten name Signorelli. Molnar (p.84) remarks that Signorelli and Sigmund share the same syllable, making Freud's parapraxis an act of self-forgetting.

The "signature" can be interpreted as a reference to the Latin verb signare and this word, instead of Freud's signore, then leads to a simple analysis of the Signorelli parapraxis. First the association Signorelli - Botticelli and furthermore the association:

Signorelli - signare - Sieg / signum - trofeo - Trafoi - Boltraffio

It was Kraepelin who first pointed at the Trafoi - trofeo association.

There seems to be no more need for the Bosnia-Herzegovina associations (Bo and Herr) Freud himself introduced. In the alternative to Freud's analysis the suicide message in Trafoi remains an important point to understand the parapraxis (this message being a blow to Freud's self-esteem).

== A methodological error ==
In attempting to connect Signorelli to Boltraffio, Freud fails to indicate why he uses some pieces of information while neglecting others. In his chain he admits 'death and sexuality' as a term linking stories from Turcs about death and sexuality with the death (suicide) caused by sexual problems of his patient. But 'death and sexuality' is a hypernym or umbrella term. Hypernymes can link terms in a large semantic field and so induce vagueness in the connection. As a chain is as strong as its weakest link, introducing a hypernym weakens the chain. Freud had to introduce the hypernym because already the first term Signor(e) in his chain was in error. Freud simply presents no criteria by which to judge a linking chain. Clearly precision of linking must be such a criterion.

Trying to find associative connections is also a problem occurring in dream interpretation and so Kraepelin's Trafoi-dream might be an undermining of Freud's practice to solely trust in free association. In his Autodidasker-dream Freud comes up with the associations Autodidakt, Author and Lasker. The first association may be in error or superfluous: Freud gives no explanations on the word Autodidakt, whereas Author is linked to J.J.David and Lasker hints to Eduard Lasker. Freud declares that the analysis of his dream accompanying the neologism Autodidasker should lead to a meaning of Autodidasker, but nowhere such a meaning is provided. He not even raises the question why the three words fuse together.

Kraepelin in April 1926 produced in a dream a neologism Rührochs. He came up with two associations Rührei and Ochsenaugen which enable to determine exactly the meaning of Rührochs: praecox, a word related to Dementia praecox.

Freud was not amused by Kraepelin's implicit critique and just cited in his literature list in the second (1909) edition of The Interpretation of Dreams an article on Kraepelin's dream speech. In this article Kraepelin's Trafoi-dream is lacking, whereas in Kraepelin's monograph, containing five more examples, it is present. In a foreword to the second edition Freud expresses his anger that psychiatrists did not cite his Dream Interpretation.

== Freud's secret ==
In Orvieto Freud visited also an Etruscan tomb. He expresses his wish to be buried in such a tomb in one of the associations to his self-dissection dream (in German Unterleibstraum). Another association, precisely to the 'dissection' images in this dream, is too painful to disclose, says Freud. However, as he also mentions the immortality theme in another association, it is clear that this immortality is related to his theory of the sexual etiology of the neuroses.

From a linguistic point of view, if one focusses not on the action of dissecting (of Freud's body) but on the word 'section', Freud's secret is readily disclosed: Sigmund - segment - sex. The first association is again an example of vowel-mutability, the second is based on etymology. 'Section', 'segment' and 'sex' all stem from Latin secare (to cut).

== See also ==
- Dream speech
- Criticism of psychoanalysis

== Sources ==
- Engels, Huub (2006). Emil Kraepelins Traumsprache 1908-1926. ISBN 978-90-6464-060-5
- Timpanaro, Sebastiano (1976). The Freudian Slip: Psychoanalysis and Textual Criticism. London: NLB.
- Swales, Peter J. (2003). "Freud, Death and Sexual Pleasures: On the Psychical Mechanism of Dr. Sigm. Freud". Arc de Cercle, vol. 1, no. 1, pp. 4-74.
- Weber, Nicholas Fox (2017). Freud's Trip to Orvieto: The Great Doctor's Unresolved Confrontation with Antisemitism, Death, and Homoeroticism; His Passion for Paintings; and the Writer in His Footsteps. New York: Bellevue Literary Press.
