= Freudian slip =

Concept in classical psychoanalysis

In psychoanalysis, a Freudian slip, also called parapraxis, is an error in speech, memory, or physical action that occurs due to the interference of an unconscious subdued wish or internal train of thought. Classical examples involve slips of the tongue, but psychoanalytic theory also embraces misreadings, mishearings, mistypings, temporary forgettings, and the mislaying and losing of objects.

== History ==
=== Origin and development ===
"Freudian slip" is named after Sigmund Freud, who, in his 1901 book The Psychopathology of Everyday Life, described and analyzed a large number of seemingly trivial, even bizarre, or nonsensical errors and slips, most notably the Signorelli parapraxis. Freud himself referred to these slips as Fehlleistungen, meaning "faulty functions", "faulty actions", or "misperformances" in German. His English translator used the Greek term parapraxes (plural of parapraxis; from Greek παρά (para) 'beyond, past, by' and πρᾶξις (praxis) 'act, action'), and coined the term "symptomatic action".

Freud's process of psychoanalysis is often described as being lengthy and complex, as was the case with many of the dreams in his 1899 book The Interpretation of Dreams. An obstacle facing the non-German-speaking reader is that Freud's emphasis on "slips of the tongue" in The Interpretation of Dreams led to the inclusion of a much colloquial and informal material that is extremely resistant to translations. As in the study of dreams, Freud discussed so-called "symptomatic actions" with the intention of demonstrating the existence of unconscious mental processes in healthy people:

In the same way that psycho-analysis makes use of dream interpretation, it also profits by the study of the numerous little slips and mistakes which people make—symptomatic actions, as they are called ... I have pointed out that these phenomena are not accidental, that they require more than physiological explanations, that they have a meaning and can be interpreted, and that one is justified in inferring from them the presence of restrained or repressed impulses and intentions.

— Freud, An Autobiographical Study (1925)

== Research and studies ==
A 1979 study investigated Freudian slips by having male test participants who had been primed with a stimulus, either related to sex or an electric shock, to read a list of words that had meaningful spoonerisms related to both stimuli. Primed participants had a far higher rate of spoonerism related to the specific stimulus. This aligns with the psychoanalytic theory that unconscious desires or fears influence speech, as demonstrated in Michael Fontaine's analysis of Plautus's Menaechmi. Fontaine explores how linguistic missteps, such as spoonerisms, can reveal latent desires and thoughts. Fontaine argues that in Plautus's plays, seemingly accidental slips of the tongue often carry significant psychological and thematic weight, revealing characters' unconscious motivations (Fontaine, 2007). Just as the test subjects in the 1979 study were more likely to produce slips related to their primed stimuli, characters in Plautus's comedies reveal hidden truths through their verbal missteps, offering a comedic yet insightful view of the human psyche.

== Alternative explanations ==
In contrast to psychoanalytic theorists, cognitive psychologists say that linguistic slips can represent a sequencing conflict in grammar production. From this perspective, slips may be due to cognitive underspecification that can take a variety of forms, such as inattention, incomplete sense data, or insufficient knowledge. Slips may also be due to the existence of some locally appropriate response pattern that is strongly primed by its prior usage, recent activation, or emotional change, or by the situation calling conditions. Some sentences are susceptible to the process of banalisation, the replacement of archaic or unusual expressions with more commonly used forms. In other words, some slips may simply be due to strong habit substitution.

=== Slips of the tongue ===
In general use, the term "Freudian slip" has been debased to refer to any accidental slips of the tongue. Thus, many examples are found in explanations and dictionaries that do not strictly fit the psychoanalytic definition. For example: "She: 'What would you like—bread and butter, or cake?' He: 'Bed and butter.'" In the above, the man may be presumed to have a sexual feeling or intention that he wished to leave unexpressed, not a sexual feeling or intention that was dynamically repressed. His sexual intention was therefore secret, rather than subconscious, and any 'parapraxis' would inhere in the idea that he unconsciously wished to express that intention, rather than in the sexual connotation of the substitution. Freudians might point out, however, that this is simply a description of what Freud and Breuer termed the preconscious, which Freud defined as thoughts that are not presently unconscious but can become conscious without meeting any resistance. In Freud's theory, he allows parapraxes to be generated in the preconscious, so he would allow for thoughts that one tries to put outside of consciousness to have effects on conscious actions.

=== Human-computer interaction ===
Beyond slips of the tongue, these accidental human errors also commonly occur in the realm of human-computer interaction. In the context of interaction design, slips refer to an incorrect action that is taken with the correct intention. As opposed to mistakes, which refer to an incorrect action due to an incorrect intention, slips result from automatic behaviors that are triggered by external factors, distracting users from carrying out their intended goals. There are many different types of slips in interaction design, including capture errors, description similarity slips, data-driven errors, associative activation, loss of activation, and mode errors.

Capture errors occur when a familiar behavior takes over a less frequently occurring behavior. An example of a capture error would be driving to the office on a Saturday when the intention was to go to the grocery store. Description similarity slips occur when an action is taken upon an item that is similar to the intended one. For example, flipping the switch for the bathroom vent fan instead of the light switch to turn on the bathroom light would be a description similarity slip. Data-driven errors occur in the arrival of new sensory information that triggers an automatic response, such as dialing the hotel concierge to reserve a particular room and dialing the room number instead.

Associative activation errors are caused by an internal correlation of two actions. For example, associating the phone ringing with someone knocking on the door and saying "come in" as a response would represent a type of associative activation error. Associative activation errors are also considered accidental slips of the tongue. Loss of activation is the error of executing an action but forgetting the goal behind the intended action. A common example of a loss of activation error is walking into a room and forgetting the purpose of walking into the room.

Lastly, mode errors occur when the input for an action is the same for different modes of operation, but the output of that action varies according to the selected mode. These errors could easily occur with the gear shift control in cars, since the action of stepping on the gas pedal to execute the action is the same for all gears, but the direction in which the car moves depends on the selected gear. This could lead to detrimental consequences if a user were accidentally in reverse mode but intended to be in drive mode.

== See also ==
- Action slip
- Bushism
- Cognition
- Eggcorn
- Lapsus
- Malapropism
- Metathesis
- Non sequitur
- Pun
- Tip of the tongue

== Sources ==
- Baars, B. J. et al. (1992). "Some caveats on testing the Freudian Slip Hypothesis: Problems in Systematic Replication". Experimental Slips and Human Error: Exploring the Architecture of Volition, pp. 289-313.
- Freud, Sigmund. (1991 [1915]). Introductory Lectures on Psychoanalysis. Penguin Books Ltd; New Ed edition, pp. 50–108.
- Jacoby L. L., & Kelley, C. M. (1992). "A process-dissociation framework for investigating unconscious influences: Freudian slips, projective tests, subliminal perception and signal detection theory". Current Directions in Psychological Science, 1, 174–179.
- Motley, M. T. (1985). "Slips of the tongue". Scientific American, 253, 116–127.
- Smith, D. J. Speech Errors, Speech Production Models, and Speech Pathology (2003)
