= Speech error =

Deviation from the apparently intended form of an utterance

A speech error, commonly referred to as a slip of the tongue (Latin: lapsus linguae, or occasionally self-demonstratingly, lipsus languae) or misspeaking, is a deviation (conscious or unconscious) from the apparently intended form of an utterance. They can be subdivided into spontaneously and inadvertently produced speech errors and intentionally produced word-plays or puns. Another distinction can be drawn between production and comprehension errors. Errors in speech production and perception are also called performance errors. Some examples of speech error include sound exchange or sound anticipation errors. In sound exchange errors, the order of two individual morphemes is reversed, while in sound anticipation errors a sound from a later syllable replaces one from an earlier syllable. Slips of the tongue are a normal and common occurrence. One study shows that most people can make up to as much as 22 slips of the tongue per day.

Speech errors are common among children, who have yet to refine their speech, and can frequently continue into adulthood. When errors continue past the age of 9 they are referred to as "residual speech errors" or RSEs. They sometimes lead to embarrassment and betrayal of the speaker's regional or ethnic origins. However, it is also common for them to enter the popular culture as a kind of linguistic "flavoring". Speech errors may be used intentionally for humorous effect, as with spoonerisms.

Within the field of psycholinguistics, speech errors fall under the category of language production. Types of speech errors include: exchange errors, perseveration, anticipation, shift, substitution, blends, additions, and deletions. The study of speech errors has contributed to the establishment/refinement of models of speech production since Victoria Fromkin's pioneering work on this topic.

== Psycholinguistic explanations ==
Speech errors are made on an occasional basis by all speakers. They occur more often when speakers are nervous, tired, anxious or intoxicated. During live broadcasts on television or on the radio, for example, nonprofessional speakers and hosts often make speech errors because they are under stress. Some speakers seem more prone to speech errors than others. For example, there is a certain connection between stuttering and speech errors. Charles F. Hockett explains that "whenever a speaker feels some anxiety about possible lapse, he will be led to focus attention more than normally on what he has just said and on what he is just about to say. These are ideal breeding grounds for stuttering." Another example of a "chronic sufferer" is William Archibald Spooner, whose peculiar speech may be caused by a cerebral dysfunction, but there is much evidence that he invented his famous speech errors (spoonerisms).

An explanation for the occurrence of speech errors comes from psychoanalysis, in the so-called Freudian slip. Sigmund Freud assumed that speech errors are the result of an intrapsychic conflict of concurrent intentions. "Virtually all speech errors [are] caused by the intrusion of repressed ideas from the unconscious into one's conscious speech output", Freud explained. In fact, his hypothesis explains only a minority of speech errors.

== Psycholinguistic classification ==
There are few speech errors that clearly fall into only one category. The majority of speech errors can be interpreted in different ways and thus fall into more than one category. For this reason, percentage figures for the different kinds of speech errors may be of limited accuracy. Moreover, the study of speech errors gave rise to different terminologies and different ways of classifying speech errors. Here is a collection of the main types:

Types of speech errors
Type	Definition	Example
Addition	"Additions add linguistic material."	Target: We; Error: We and I
Anticipation	"A later segment takes the place of an earlier segment."	Target: reading list Error: leading list
Blends	Blends are a subcategory of lexical selection errors. More than one item is being considered during speech production. Consequently, the two intended items fuse together.	Target: false/baseless Error: falseless
Deletion	Deletions or omissions leave some linguistic material out.	Target: unanimity of opinion Error: unamity of opinion
Exchange	Exchanges are double shifts. Two linguistic units change places.	Target: getting your nose remodeled Error: getting your model renosed
Lexical selection error	The speaker has "problems with selecting the correct word".	Target: tennis racquet Error: tennis bat
Malapropism, classical	The speaker has the wrong beliefs about the meaning of a word. Consequently, they produce the intended word, which is semantically inadequate. Therefore, this is a competence error rather than a performance error. Malapropisms are named after 'Mrs. Malaprop', a character from Richard B. Sheridan's eighteenth-century play The Rivals.	Target: The flood damage was so bad they had to evacuate the city. Error: The flood damage was so bad they had to evaporate the city.
Metathesis	"Switching of two sounds, each taking the place of the other."	Target: rough and ready Error: ref and ruddy
Morpheme-exchange error	Morphemes change places.	Target: He has already packed two trunks. Error: He has already packs two trunked.
Morpheme stranding	Morphemes remain in place but are attached to the wrong words.	Target: He has already packed two trunks. Error: He has already trunked two packs.
Omission	cf. deletions	Target: She can't tell me. Error: She can tell me.
Perseveration	"An earlier segment replaces a later item."	Target: black boxes Error: black bloxes
Residual speech errors	"Distortions of late-developing sounds such as /s/, /l/, and /r/."	Target: The box is red. Error: The box is wed.
Shift	"One speech segment disappears from its appropriate location and appears somewhere else."	Target: She decides to hit it. Error: She decide to hits it.
Sound-exchange error	Two sounds switch places.	Target: Night life [nait laif] Error: Knife light [naif lait]
Spoonerism	A spoonerism is a kind of metathesis. Switching of initial sounds of two separate words. They are named after Reverend William Archibald Spooner, who probably invented most of his famous spoonerisms.	Target: I saw you light a fire. Error: I saw you fight a liar.
Substitution	One segment is replaced by an intruder. The source of the intrusion is not in the sentence.	Target: Where is my tennis racquet? Error: Where is my tennis bat?
Word-exchange error	A word-exchange error is a subcategory of lexical selection errors. Two words are switched.	Target: I must let the cat out of the house. Error: I must let the house out of the cat.

Speech errors can affect different kinds of segments or linguistic units:

Segments
Segment	Example
Distinctive or phonetic features	Target: clear blue sky Error: glear plue sky (voicing)
Phonemes or sounds	Target: ad hoc Error: odd hack
Sequences of sounds	Target: straw poll Error: paw stroll
Morphemes	Target: sure Error: unsure
Words	Target: I hereby deputize you. Error: I hereby jeopardize you.
Phrases	Target: The sun is shining./The sky is blue. Error: The sky is shining.

=== Types ===
- Grammatical – For example, children take time to learn irregular verbs, so in English use the -ed form incorrectly. This is explored by Steven Pinker in his book Words and Rules.
- Mispronunciation
- Vocabulary – Young children make category approximations, using car for truck for example. This is known as hyponymy.

==== Examples ====
- "particuly" (particularly) ← elision
- "syntaxically" (syntactically) ← vocabulary

== Scientific relevance ==
Speech production is a highly complex and extremely rapid process, and thus research into the involved mental mechanisms proves to be difficult. Investigating the audible output of the speech production system is a way to understand these mental mechanisms. According to Gary S. Dell, "the inner workings of a highly complex system are often revealed by the way in which the system breaks down". Therefore, speech errors are of an explanatory value with regard to the nature of language and language production.

=== Evidence and insights ===
Speech errors provide insights into the sequential order of language production processes and the interactivity of language production modules.

Speech errors involve substitutions, shifts, additions and deletions of segments. "In order to move a sound, the speaker must think of it as a separate unit." Obviously, speech errors cannot be accounted for without considering these discrete segments. They constitute the planning units of language production. Among them are distinctive features, phonemes, morphemes, syllables, words and phrases. Victoria Fromkin points out that "many of the segments that change and move in speech errors are precisely those postulated by linguistic theories." Consequently, speech errors give evidence that these units are psychologically real.

It can be inferred from speech errors that speakers adhere to a set of linguistic rules. "There is a complex set of rules which the language user follows when making use of these units." Among them are for example phonetic constraints, which prescribe the possible sequences of sounds. Moreover, the study of speech error confirmed the existence of rules that state how morphemes are to be pronounced or how they should be combined with other morphemes. The following examples show that speech errors also observe these rules:

Target: He likes to have his team rested. [rest+id]
Error: He likes to have his rest teamed. [ti:m+d]

Target: Both kids are sick. [kid+z]
Error: Both sicks are kids. [sik+s]

Here, the past tense morpheme and the plural morpheme are phonologically conditioned, although the lemmas are exchanged. This proves that the lemmas are inserted before phonological conditioning takes place.

Target: Don't yell so loud! / Don't shout so loud!
Error: Don't shell so loud!

"Shout" and "yell" are both appropriate words in this context. Due to the pressure to continue speaking, the speaker has to make a quick decision which word should be selected. This pressure leads to the speaker's attempt to utter the two words simultaneously, which resulted in the creation of a blend. According to Charles F. Hockett, there are six possible blends of "shout" and "yell". The speaker obeyed unconscious linguistic rules because they selected the blend which satisfied the linguistic demands of these rules the best. Illegal non-words are for example instantaneously rejected.

In conclusion, the rules that govern the production of speech must also be part of our mental organization of language.

Errors in speech are non-random. Linguists can elicit from the speech error data how speech errors are produced and which linguistic rules they adhere to. As a result, they are able to predict speech errors.

==== Lexical errors ====
The existence of lexical or phonemic exchange errors indicates that speakers typically engage in planning their utterances beforehand. In each case, the whole utterance seems available to them.

Anticipation

Target: Take my bike.
Error: Bake my bike.

Perseveration

Target: He pulled a tantrum.
Error: He pulled a pantrum.

==== Performance errors ====
Performance errors may provide empirical evidence for linguistic theories and serve to test hypotheses about language and speech production models. For that reason, the study of speech errors is significant for the construction of performance models and gives insight into language mechanisms.

Performance errors supply evidence for the psychological existence of discrete linguistic units.

==== Substitution errors ====
Substitution errors, for instance, reveal parts of the organization and structure of the mental lexicon.

Target: My thesis is too long.
Error: My thesis is too short.

In the case of substitution errors, both segments mostly belong to the same category, which means for example that a noun is substituted for a noun. Lexical selection errors are based on semantic relations such as synonymy, antonymy or membership of the same lexical field. For this reason, the mental lexicon is structured in terms of semantic relationships.

Target: George's wife
Error: George's life

Target: fashion square
Error: passion square

Some substitution errors based on phonological similarities demonstrate that the mental lexicon is also organized in terms of sound.

==== Generalizations ====
Four generalizations about speech errors have been identified:

1. Interacting elements tend to come from a similar linguistic environment, which means that initial, middle, final segments interact with one another.
2. Elements that interact with one another tend to be phonetically or semantically similar to one another. This means that consonants exchange with consonants and vowels with vowels.
3. Slips are consistent with the phonological rules of the language.
4. There are consistent stress patterns in speech errors. Predominantly, both interacting segments receive major or minor stress.

These four generalizations support the idea of the lexical bias effect. This effect states that our phonological speech errors generally form words rather than non-words. Baars (1975) showed evidence for this effect when he presented word pairs in rapid succession and asked participants to say both words in rapid succession back. In most of the trials, the mistakes made still formed actual words.

== Information obtained from performance additions ==
An example of the information that can be obtained is the use of "um" or "uh" in a conversation. These might be meaningful words that tell different things, one of which is to hold a place in the conversation to prevent interruption. There seems to be a hesitant stage and fluent stage that suggest speech has different levels of production. The pauses seem to occur between sentences, conjunctional points and before the first content word in a sentence. That suggests that a large part of speech production happens there.

Schachter et al. (1991) conducted an experiment to examine if the numbers of word choices affect pausing. They sat in on the lectures of 47 undergraduate professors from 10 different departments and calculated the number and times of filled pauses and unfilled pauses. They found significantly more pauses in the humanities departments as opposed to the natural sciences. These findings suggest a correlation between the quantity of word choices and the frequency of pauses, hence the pauses serve to give speakers time to choose their words.

Slips of the tongue can occur at various levels: syntactic, phrasal, lexical-semantic, morphological, and phonological. They can take multiple forms, such as additions, substitutions, deletions, exchanges, anticipations, perseverations, shifts, and haplologies.

There are some biases shown through slips of the tongue. One kind is a lexical bias which shows that the slips people generate are more often actual words than random sound strings. Baars Motley and Mackay (1975) found that it was more common for people to turn two actual words into two other actual words than when they do not create real words.

A second kind is a semantic bias which shows a tendency for sound bias to create words that are semantically related to other words in the linguistic environment. Motley and Baars (1976) found that a word pair like "get one" will more likely slip to "wet gun" if the pair before it is "damp rifle". These results suggest that people are sensitive to how things are laid out semantically.

== Euphemistic misspeaking ==
Since the 1980s, the word misspeaking has been used increasingly in politics to imply that errors made by a speaker are accidental and should not be construed as a deliberate attempt to misrepresent the facts of a case. As such, its usage has attracted a degree of media coverage, particularly from critics who feel that the term is overly approbative in cases where either ignorance of the facts or intent to misrepresent should not be discarded as possibilities.

The word was used by a White House spokesman after George W. Bush seemed to say that his government was always "thinking about new ways to harm our country and our people" (a classic example of a Bushism), and more famously by then American presidential candidate Hillary Clinton who recalled landing in at the US military outpost of Tuzla "under sniper fire" (in fact, video footage demonstrates that there were no such problems on her arrival). Other users of the term include American politician Richard Blumenthal, who incorrectly stated on a number of occasions that he had served in Vietnam during the Vietnam War.

== See also ==
- Auditory processing disorder
- Barbarism (grammar)
- Developmental verbal dyspraxia
- Epenthesis
- Error (linguistics)
- Errors in early word use
- Folk etymology
- FOXP2
- Malapropism
- Metathesis (linguistics)
- Paraphasia
- Signorelli parapraxis
- Tongue twister
