= Pejorative =

Derogatory or discriminating term.

The Oxford English Dictionary describes a pejorative as both a noun and an adjective:

Noun. "A word or expression which by its form or context expresses or implies contempt for the thing named; a derogatory word or form."

Adjective. "Depreciatory, contemptuous; (Linguistics) giving or acquiring a less favourable meaning or connotation."

A pejorative is a word that is derogatory which often expresses hostility and contempt. Pejoratives are words that are extremely offensive. However, a term can be regarded as pejorative in some social or ethnic groups but not in others.

One minor distinction between pejoratives and slurs is that pejoratives are word-only, while slurs or slurring can be done both verbally and without "the use of language". However, this transitive use of the word slur is uncommon outside of philosophy academia. The OED's last cited common usage of the transitive "slur" was in 1867.

The Latin root of the word pejorative is peioritas "perior" meaning "worse" and "tās" meaning "-ness" directly translating to worseness or inferiority.

== Pejoration and melioration ==
In historical linguistics, the process of an inoffensive word becoming pejorative is a form of semantic drift known as pejoration. An example of pejoration is the shift in meaning of the word silly from meaning that a person was happy and fortunate to meaning that they are foolish and unsophisticated. The process of pejoration can repeat itself around a single concept, leaping from word to word in a phenomenon known as the euphemism treadmill, for example as in the successive pejoration of the terms bog-house, privy-house, latrine, water closet, toilet, bathroom, and restroom (US English).

When a term begins as pejorative and eventually is adopted in a non-pejorative sense, this is called melioration or amelioration. One example is the shift in meaning of the word nice from meaning a person was foolish to meaning that a person is pleasant. When performed deliberately, it can be described as reclamation or reappropriation. An example of a word that has been reclaimed by portions of the community that it targets is queer, which began being re-appropriated as a positive descriptor in the early 1990s by activist groups. However, due to its history and – in some regions – continued use as a pejorative, there remain LGBTQIA+ individuals who are uncomfortable with having this term applied to them. The use of the racial slur nigger (specifically the -a variant) by African Americans is often viewed as another act of reclamation, though some people of sub-Saharan African descent object to the use of the word under any circumstances.

== See also ==
- Pejorative suffix
- Approbative
- Defamation
- Dysphemism
- Fighting words
- Insult
- List of ethnic slurs
- List of religious slurs
- Lists of pejorative terms for people
- Profanity
