= Communication strategies in second-language acquisition =

Overcoming communication difficulties in a second language

In the course of learning a second language, learners will frequently encounter communication problems caused by a lack of linguistic resources. Communication strategies are strategies that learners use to overcome these problems in order to convey their intended meaning. Strategies used may include paraphrasing, substitution, coining new words, switching to the first language, and asking for clarification. These strategies, with the exception of switching languages, are also used by native speakers.

The term communication strategy was introduced by Selinker in 1972, and the first systematic analysis of communication strategies was made by Varadi in 1973. There were various other studies in the 1970s, but the real boom in communication strategy scholarship came in the 1980s. This decade saw a flurry of papers describing and analyzing communication strategies, and saw Ellen Bialystok link communication strategies to her general theory of second-language acquisition. There was more activity in the 1990s with a collection of papers by Kasper and Kellerman and a review article by Dörnyei and Scott, but there has been relatively little research on the subject since then.

== Communication strategies ==
No comprehensive list of strategies has been agreed on by researchers in second-language acquisition, but some commonly used strategies have been observed:

Circumlocution
This refers to learners using different words or phrases to express their intended meaning. For example, if learners do not know the word grandfather they may paraphrase it by saying "my father's father".

Semantic avoidance
Learners may avoid a problematic word by using a different one, for example substituting the irregular verb make with the regular verb ask. The regularity of "ask" makes it easier to use correctly.

Word coinage
This refers to learners creating new words or phrases for words that they do not know. For example, a learner might refer to an art gallery as a "picture place".

Language switch
Learners may insert a word from their first language into a sentence, and hope that their interlocutor will understand.

Asking for clarification
The strategy of asking an interlocutor for the correct word or other help is a communication strategy.

Non-verbal strategies
This can refer to strategies such as the use of gesture and mime to augment or replace verbal communication.

Avoidance
Avoidance, which takes multiple forms, has been identified as a communication strategy. Learners of a second language may learn to avoid talking about topics for which they lack the necessary vocabulary or other language skills in the second language. Also, language learners sometimes start to try to talk about a topic, but abandon the effort in mid-utterance after discovering that they lack the language resources needed to complete their message.

== Research ==
Research in communication strategies reached its peak in the 1980s, and has since fallen out of favor as a research topic in second-language acquisition. Some researchers who have studied communication strategies and their effect on language acquisition include Elaine Tarone, Claus Faerch, Gabriele Kasper, and Ellen Bialystok.

Kasper and Faerch proposed a model of speech production that involved a planning phase and a production phase. Communication strategies were seen as belonging to the planning phase; their use became necessary if the learner experienced a problem with the initial plan that they made. In addition to the strategies outlined above Kasper and Faerch also pointed to the possibility of using a reductive strategy such as switching to a completely different topic.

Researchers have identified three components of communication strategies: problematicity, meaning that the person recognizes a communication problem; consciousness, meaning that the person is conscious of the problem and is consciously employing a strategy to resolve it; and intentionality, which implies that the person is able to choose between options for overcoming a communication problem. However, Bialystok and other researchers have pointed out that communication strategies may be employed by language learners when there has been no breakdown in communications (no problematicity) and that language learners typically use the same small set of strategies routinely, rather than intentionally and consciously choosing to employ a communications strategy.

Some learners' interlanguages are characterized by communication strategies, and Larry Selinker has noted that they are one of the processes that leads to learner errors. Based on this observation, Rod Ellis suggests that the communication strategies that learners use may be characteristic of the stage of development which they have reached.
