= Error (linguistics) =

Unintended deviation from the rules of a language variety

In applied linguistics, an error is an unintended deviation from the immanent rules of a language variety made by a second language learner. Such errors result from the learner's lack of knowledge of the correct rules of the target language variety. A significant distinction is generally made between errors (systematic deviations) and mistakes (speech performance errors) which are not treated the same from a linguistic viewpoint. The study of learners' errors has been the main area of investigation by linguists in the history of second-language acquisition research.

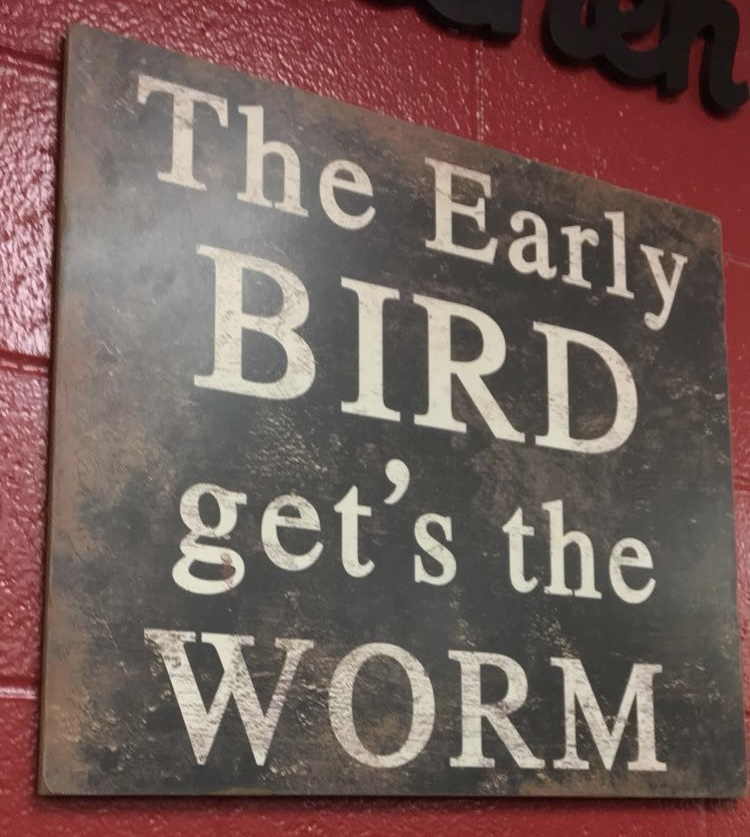
The sign mistakenly says "The early bird get's the worm.", which actually means "The early bird get has the worm." A possessive apostrophe has been used to conjugate the verb "get".

In prescriptivist contexts, the terms "error" and "mistake" are also used to describe usages that are considered non-standard or otherwise discouraged normatively. Such usages, however, would not be considered true errors by the majority of linguistic scholars. Modern linguistics generally does not make such judgments about regularly occurring native speech, rejecting the idea of linguistic correctness as scientifically untenable, or at least approaching the concept of correct usage in relative terms. Social perceptions and value claims about different speech varieties, although common socially, are not normally supported by linguistics.

== Definition ==
H. Douglas Brown defines linguistic errors as "a noticeable deviation from the adult grammar of a native speaker, reflecting the interlanguage competence of the learner." He cites an example, Does John can sing?, where a preceding do auxiliary verb has been used as an error.

== Difference between error and mistake ==
In linguistics, it is considered important to distinguish errors from mistakes. A distinction is always made between errors and mistakes where the former is defined as resulting from a learner's lack of proper grammatical knowledge, whilst the latter as a failure to use a known system correctly. Brown terms these mistakes as performance errors. Mistakes of this kind are frequently made by both native speakers and second language learners. However, native speakers are generally able to correct themselves quickly. Such mistakes include slips of the tongue and random ungrammatical formations. On the other hand, errors are systematic in that they occur repeatedly and are not recognizable by the learner. They are a part of the learner's interlanguage, and the learner does not generally consider them as errors. They are errors only from the perspective of teachers and others who are aware that the learner has deviated from a grammatical norm. That is, mistakes (performance errors) can be self-corrected with or without being pointed out to the speaker but systematic errors cannot be self-corrected.

== Importance of error ==
S. Pit Corder was probably the first to point out and discuss the importance of errors learners make in course of their learning a second language. Soon after, the study and analysis of learners’ errors took a prominent place in applied linguistics. Brown suggests that the process of second language learning is not very different from learning a first language, and the feedback an L2 learner gets upon making errors benefits them in developing the L2 knowledge.

== See also ==
- Error analysis (linguistics)
- Error treatment (linguistics)
- Grammaticality
- Overview table in Homonym#Related terms
