= Embodied embedded cognition =

Theory in cognitive science

Embodied embedded cognition (EEC) is a philosophical theoretical position in cognitive science, closely related to situated cognition, embodied cognition, embodied cognitive science and dynamical systems theory. The theory states that intelligent behaviour emerges from the interplay between brain, body and world. The world is not just the 'play-ground' on which the brain is acting. Rather, brain, body and world are equally important factors in the explanation of how particular intelligent behaviours come about in practice.

== Embodiment and embeddedness ==
EEC is divided into two aspects: embodiment and embeddedness (or situatedness).

Embodiment refers to the idea that the body's internal milieu (a.o. homeostatic and hormonal states) heavily influences the higher 'cognitive' processes in the brain, presumably via the emotional system (see e.g. Antonio Damasio's theory of somatic markers). To put it simply: the state of your body is a direct factor of importance on the kinds of cognitive processes that may arise in the higher parts of your brain.

Embeddedness refers to the idea that physical interaction between the body and the world strongly constrain the possible behaviours of the organism, which in turn influences (indeed, partly constitutes) the cognitive processes that emerge from the interaction between organism and world.

The theory is an explicit reaction to the currently dominant cognitivist paradigm, which states that cognitive systems are essentially computational-representational systems (like computer software), processing input and generating output (behaviour) on the basis of internal information processing. In cognitivism, the causal root of behaviour lies in the 'virtual' processes governed by the software that runs on our brains. The brain is purely the hardware on which the software is implemented. The body (sensors and actors) are purely input-output devices that are in service of the brain. The world is merely the play-ground (the object) in which the cognitive agent acts.

In contrast, EEC holds that the actual physical processes in body and in body-world interaction partly constitute whatever it is that we call 'the cognitive system' as a whole. Body, world and brain form a system. Together these system-parts 'cause' intelligent behaviour to arise as a system property. Dynamical Systems Theory is a way of modeling behaviour that teams up quite naturally with the theoretical concepts of EEC. The theory of practopoiesis describes the rules adaptive systems need to obey if they are to successfully implement embodied and embedded cognition.

Under the umbrella of 4E cognition, the theories of the embodied embedded mind are connected with the extended mind theory and enactivism.

Current discussions include:

- Is EEC really a (positive) theory of itself, or merely a bunch of complaints about what is wrong about (a too extreme version of) cognitivism?
- Is EEC too 'descriptive', instead of really explaining anything about cognition?
- How can EEC explain linguistic processes and processes of explicit conscious reasoning?
- What would be the most informative empirical hypotheses, starting from an EEC perspective?
- Can we use traditional methods (stimulus-response paradigms) of experimental psychology to test EEC hypotheses?

== Theorists ==
Theorists that inspired the EEC programme (but might not necessarily adhere to the above position) include:

- Lawrence Barsalou
- Randall Beer
- Valentino Braitenberg
- Rodney Brooks
- William Clancey
- Andy Clark
- Paul Dourish
- Gerald Edelman
- Shaun Gallagher
- Vittorio Guidano
- Pim Haselager
- Martin Heidegger
- Susan Hurley
- Edmund Husserl
- Edwin Hutchins
- Fred Keijzer
- David Kirsh
- Humberto Maturana
- Maurice Merleau-Ponty
- Alva Noë
- Jean Piaget
- Eleanor Rosch
- Mark Rowlands
- Evan Thompson
- Francisco Varela
- Jacob Von Uexküll
- Dan Zahavi
- Tom Ziemke

== See also ==
- Autopoesis – System capable of producing itself
- Enactivism – Philosophical concept
- Extended cognition – Philosophy of mind where the mind resides beyond the brain and body
- Neuroconstructivism – Theory about how the brain sculpts itself and becomes specialized over time
- Neurophenomenology – Research into the problem of consciousness
- Practopoiesis – System that can adapt to the environment
- Pragmatism – Philosophical tradition
- Situated cognition – Hypothesis that knowing is inseparable from doing
