= Enactivism =

Philosophical concept

Enactivism is a theory in cognitive science that argues that cognition arises through interaction between an acting organism and its environment, with historical roots in Buddhism, phenomenology, and the cognitive sciences. It claims that the environment of an organism is brought about, or enacted, by the active exercise of that organism's sensorimotor processes. "The key point, then, is that the species brings forth and specifies its own domain of problems ...this domain does not exist "out there" in an environment that acts as a landing pad for organisms that somehow drop or parachute into the world. Instead, living beings and their environments stand in relation to each other through mutual specification or codetermination" (p. 198). "Organisms do not passively receive information from their environments, which they then translate into internal representations. Natural cognitive systems...participate in the generation of meaning ...engaging in transformational and not merely informational interactions: they enact a world." These authors suggest that the increasing emphasis upon enactive terminology presages a new era in thinking about cognitive science. How the actions involved in enactivism relate to age-old questions about free will remains a topic of active debate.

The term 'enactivism' is close in meaning to 'enaction', defined as "the manner in which a subject of perception creatively matches its actions to the requirements of its situation". The introduction of the term enaction in this context is attributed to Francisco Varela, Evan Thompson, and Eleanor Rosch in The Embodied Mind (1991), who proposed the name to "emphasize the growing conviction that cognition is not the representation of a pre-given world by a pre-given mind but is rather the enactment of a world and a mind on the basis of a history of the variety of actions that a being in the world performs". This was further developed by Thompson and others, to place emphasis upon the idea that experience of the world is a result of mutual interaction between the sensorimotor capacities of the organism and its environment. However, some writers maintain that there remains a need for some degree of the mediating function of representation in this new approach to the science of the mind.

The initial emphasis of enactivism upon sensorimotor skills has been criticized as "cognitively marginal", but it has been extended to apply to higher level cognitive activities, such as social interactions. "In the enactive view,... knowledge is constructed: it is constructed by an agent through its sensorimotor interactions with its environment, co-constructed between and within living species through their meaningful interaction with each other. In its most abstract form, knowledge is co-constructed between human individuals in socio-linguistic interactions...Science is a particular form of social knowledge construction...[that] allows us to perceive and predict events beyond our immediate cognitive grasp...and also to construct further, even more powerful scientific knowledge."

Enactivism is closely related to situated cognition and embodied cognition, and is presented as an alternative to cognitivism, computationalism, and Cartesian dualism.

== Philosophical aspects ==
Enactivism is one of a cluster of related theories sometimes known as the 4Es, also known as 4E cognition. As described by Mark Rowlands, mental processes are:

- Embodied involving more than the brain, including a more general involvement of bodily structures and processes.
- Embedded functioning only in a related external environment.
- Enacted involving not only neural processes, but also things an organism does.
- Extended into the organism's environment.

Enactivism proposes an alternative to dualism as a philosophy of mind, in that it emphasises the interactions between mind, body and the environment, seeing them all as inseparably intertwined in mental processes. The self arises as part of the process of an embodied entity interacting with the environment in precise ways determined by its physiology. In this sense, individuals can be seen to "grow into" or arise from their interactive role with the world.

"Enaction is the idea that organisms create their own experience through their actions. Organisms are not passive receivers of input from the environment, but are actors in the environment such that what they experience is shaped by how they act."

In The Tree of Knowledge Maturana & Varela proposed the term enactive "to evoke the view of knowledge that what is known is brought forth, in contraposition to the more classical views of either cognitivism (Note: Cognition as information processing like that of a digital computer. From Evan Thompson (2010-09-30). Mind in Life. Harvard University Press. ISBN 978-0-674-05751-7. Cognitivism, p. 4; See also Steven Horst (December 10, 2009). "The computational theory of mind". In Edward N. Zalta (ed.). The Stanford Encyclopedia of Philosophy (Spring 2011 Edition).) or connectionism. (Note: Cognition as emergent patterns of activity in a neural network. From Evan Thompson (2010-09-30). Mind in Life. Harvard University Press. ISBN 978-0-674-05751-7. Connectionism, p. 8; See also James Garson (July 27, 2010). Edward N. Zalta (ed.). "Connectionism". The Stanford Encyclopedia of Philosophy (Spring 2011 Edition).) They see enactivism as providing a middle ground between the two extremes of representationalism and solipsism. They seek to "confront the problem of understanding how our existence-the praxis of our living- is coupled to a surrounding world which appears filled with regularities that are at every instant the result of our biological and social histories.... to find a via media: to understand the regularity of the world we are experiencing at every moment, but without any point of reference independent of ourselves that would give certainty to our descriptions and cognitive assertions. Indeed the whole mechanism of generating ourselves, as describers and observers tells us that our world, as the world which we bring forth in our coexistence with others, will always have precisely that mixture of regularity and mutability, that combination of solidity and shifting sand, so typical of human experience when we look at it up close."[Tree of Knowledge, p. 241] Another important notion relating to enactivism is autopoiesis. The word refers to a system that is able to reproduce and maintain itself. Maturana & Varela describe that "This was a word without a history, a word that could directly mean what takes place in the dynamics of the autonomy proper to living systems" Using the term autopoiesis, they argue that any closed system that has autonomy, self-reference and self-construction (or, that has autopoietic activities) has cognitive capacities. Therefore, cognition is present in all living systems. This view is also called autopoietic enactivism.

Radical enactivism is another form of enactivist view of cognition. Radical enactivists often adopt a thoroughly non-representational, enactive account of basic cognition. Basic cognitive capacities mentioned by Hutto and Myin include perceiving, imagining and remembering. They argue that those forms of basic cognition can be explained without positing mental representations. With regard to complex forms of cognition such as language, they think mental representations are needed, because there needs explanations of content. In human being's public practices, they claim that "such intersubjective practices and sensitivity to the relevant norms comes with the mastery of the use of public symbol systems" (2017, p. 120), and so "as it happens, this appears only to have occurred in full form with construction of sociocultural cognitive niches in the human lineage" (2017, p. 134). They conclude that basic cognition as well as cognition in simple organisms such as bacteria are best characterized as non-representational.

Enactivism also addresses the hard problem of consciousness, referred to by Thompson as part of the explanatory gap in explaining how consciousness and subjective experience are related to brain and body. "The problem with the dualistic concepts of consciousness and life in standard formulations of the hard problem is that they exclude each other by construction". Instead, according to Thompson's view of enactivism, the study of consciousness or phenomenology as exemplified by Husserl and Merleau-Ponty is to complement science and its objectification of the world. "The whole universe of science is built upon the world as directly experienced, and if we want to subject science itself to rigorous scrutiny and arrive at a precise assessment of its meaning and scope, we must begin by reawakening the basic experience of the world of which science is the second-order expression" (Merleau-Ponty, The phenomenology of perception as quoted by Thompson, p. 165). In this interpretation, enactivism asserts that science is formed or enacted as part of humankind's interactivity with its world, and by embracing phenomenology "science itself is properly situated in relation to the rest of human life and is thereby secured on a sounder footing."

Enaction has been seen as a move to conjoin representationalism with phenomenalism, that is, as adopting a constructivist epistemology, an epistemology centered upon the active participation of the subject in constructing reality. However, 'constructivism' focuses upon more than a simple 'interactivity' that could be described as a minor adjustment to 'assimilate' reality or 'accommodate' to it. Constructivism looks upon interactivity as a radical, creative, revisionist process in which the knower constructs a personal 'knowledge system' based upon their experience and tested by its viability in practical encounters with their environment. Learning is a result of perceived anomalies that produce dissatisfaction with existing conceptions.

Shaun Gallagher also points out that pragmatism is a forerunner of enactive and extended approaches to cognition. According to him, enactive conceptions of cognition can be found in many pragmatists such as Charles Sanders Peirce and John Dewey. For example, Dewey says, "The brain is essentially an organ for effecting the reciprocal adjustment to each other of the stimuli received from the environment and responses directed upon it." This view is fully consistent with enactivist arguments that cognition is not just a matter of brain processes and brain is one part of the body consisting of the dynamical regulation. Robert Brandom, a neo-pragmatist, comments that "A founding idea of pragmatism is that the most fundamental kind of intentionality (in the sense of directedness towards objects) is the practical involvement with objects exhibited by a sentient creature dealing skillfully with its world" (2008, p. 178).

How does constructivism relate to enactivism? From the above remarks it can be seen that Glasersfeld expresses an interactivity between the knower and the known quite acceptable to an enactivist, but does not emphasize the structured probing of the environment by the knower that leads to the "perturbation relative to some expected result" that then leads to a new understanding. It is this probing activity, especially where it is not accidental but deliberate, that characterizes enaction, and invokes affect, that is, the motivation and planning that lead to doing and to fashioning the probing, both observing and modifying the environment, so that "perceptions and nature condition one another through generating one another." The questioning nature of this probing activity is not an emphasis of Piaget and Glasersfeld.

Sharing enactivism's stress upon both action and embodiment in the incorporation of knowledge, but giving Glasersfeld's mechanism of viability an evolutionary emphasis, is evolutionary epistemology. Inasmuch as an organism must reflect its environment well enough for the organism to be able to survive in it, and to be competitive enough to be able to reproduce at sustainable rate, the structure and reflexes of the organism itself embody knowledge of its environment. This biology-inspired theory of the growth of knowledge is closely tied to universal Darwinism, and is associated with evolutionary epistemologists such as Karl Popper, Donald T. Campbell, Peter Munz, and Gary Cziko. According to Munz, "an organism is an embodied theory about its environment... Embodied theories are also no longer expressed in language, but in anatomical structures or reflex responses, etc."

One objection to enactive approaches to cognition is the so-called "scale-up objection". According to this objection, enactive theories only have limited value because they cannot "scale up" to explain more complex cognitive capacities like human thoughts. Those phenomena are extremely difficult to explain without positing representation. But recently, some philosophers are trying to respond to such objection. For example, Adrian Downey (2020) provides a non-representational account of Obsessive-compulsive disorder, and then argues that ecological-enactive approaches can respond to the "scaling up" objection.

== Psychological aspects ==
McGann & others argue that enactivism attempts to mediate between the explanatory role of the coupling between cognitive agent and environment and the traditional emphasis on brain mechanisms found in neuroscience and psychology. In the interactive approach to social cognition developed by De Jaegher & others, the dynamics of interactive processes are seen to play significant roles in coordinating interpersonal understanding, processes that in part include what they call participatory sense-making. Recent developments of enactivism in the area of social neuroscience involve the proposal of The Interactive Brain Hypothesis where social cognition brain mechanisms, even those used in non-interactive situations, are proposed to have interactive origins.

=== Enactive views of perception ===
In the enactive view, perception "is not conceived as the transmission of information but more as an exploration of the world by various means. Cognition is not tied into the workings of an 'inner mind', some cognitive core, but occurs in directed interaction between the body and the world it inhabits."

Alva Noë in advocating an enactive view of perception sought to resolve how we perceive three-dimensional objects, on the basis of two-dimensional input. He argues that we perceive this solidity (or 'volumetricity') by appealing to patterns of sensorimotor expectations. These arise from our agent-active 'movements and interaction' with objects, or 'object-active' changes in the object itself. The solidity is perceived through our expectations and skills in knowing how the object's appearance would change with changes in how we relate to it. He saw all perception as an active exploration of the world, rather than being a passive process, something which happens to us.

Noë's idea of the role of 'expectations' in three-dimensional perception has been opposed by several philosophers, notably by Andy Clark. Clark points to difficulties of the enactive approach. He points to internal processing of visual signals, for example, in the ventral and dorsal pathways, the two-streams hypothesis. This results in an integrated perception of objects (their recognition and location, respectively) yet this processing cannot be described as an action or actions. In a more general criticism, Clark suggests that perception is not a matter of expectations about sensorimotor mechanisms guiding perception. Rather, although the limitations of sensorimotor mechanisms constrain perception, this sensorimotor activity is drastically filtered to fit current needs and purposes of the organism, and it is these imposed 'expectations' that govern perception, filtering for the 'relevant' details of sensorimotor input (called "sensorimotor summarizing").

These sensorimotor-centered and purpose-centered views appear to agree on the general scheme but disagree on the dominance issue – is the dominant component peripheral or central. Another view, the closed-loop perception one, assigns equal a-priori dominance to the peripheral and central components. In closed-loop perception, perception emerges through the process of inclusion of an item in a motor-sensory-motor loop, i.e., a loop (or loops) connecting the peripheral and central components that are relevant to that item. The item can be a body part (in which case the loops are in steady-state) or an external object (in which case the loops are perturbed and gradually converge to a steady state). These enactive loops are always active, switching dominance by the need.

Another application of enaction to perception is analysis of the human hand. The many remarkably demanding uses of the hand are not learned by instruction, but through a history of engagements that lead to the acquisition of skills. According to one interpretation, it is suggested that "the hand [is]...an organ of cognition", not a faithful subordinate working under top-down instruction, but a partner in a "bi-directional interplay between manual and brain activity." According to Daniel Hutto: "Enactivists are concerned to defend the view that our most elementary ways of engaging with the world and others - including our basic forms of perception and perceptual experience - are mindful in the sense of being phenomenally charged and intentionally directed, despite being non-representational and content-free." Hutto calls this position 'REC' (Radical Enactive Cognition): "According to REC, there is no way to distinguish neural activity that is imagined to be genuinely content involving (and thus truly mental, truly cognitive) from other non-neural activity that merely plays a supporting or enabling role in making mind and cognition possible."

=== Participatory sense-making ===
Hanne De Jaegher and Ezequiel Di Paolo (2007) have extended the enactive concept of sense-making into the social domain. The idea takes as its departure point the process of interaction between individuals in a social encounter. De Jaegher and Di Paolo argue that the interaction process itself can take on a form of autonomy (operationally defined). This allows them to define social cognition as the generation of meaning and its transformation through interacting individuals.

The notion of participatory sense-making has led to the proposal that interaction processes can sometimes play constitutive roles in social cognition (De Jaegher, Di Paolo, Gallagher, 2010). It has been applied to research in social neuroscience and autism.

In a similar vein, "an inter-enactive approach to agency holds that the behavior of agents in a social situation unfolds not only according to their individual abilities and goals, but also according to the conditions and constraints imposed by the autonomous dynamics of the interaction process itself". According to Torrance, enactivism involves five interlocking themes related to the question "What is it to be a (cognizing, conscious) agent?" It is:

1. to be a biologically autonomous (autopoietic) organism
2. to generate significance or meaning, rather than to act via...updated internal representations of the external world
3. to engage in sense-making via dynamic coupling with the environment
4. to 'enact' or 'bring forth' a world of significances by mutual co-determination of the organism with its enacted world
5. to arrive at an experiential awareness via lived embodiment in the world.

Torrance adds that "many kinds of agency, in particular the agency of human beings, cannot be understood separately from understanding the nature of the interaction that occurs between agents." That view introduces the social applications of enactivism. "Social cognition is regarded as the result of a special form of action, namely social interaction...the enactive approach looks at the circular dynamic within a dyad of embodied agents."

In cultural psychology, enactivism is seen as a way to uncover cultural influences upon feeling, thinking and acting. Baerveldt and Verheggen argue that "It appears that seemingly natural experience is thoroughly intertwined with sociocultural realities." They suggest that the social patterning of experience is to be understood through enactivism, "the idea that the reality we have in common, and in which we find ourselves, is neither a world that exists independently from us, nor a socially shared way of representing such a pregiven world, but a world itself brought forth by our ways of communicating and our joint action....The world we inhabit is manufactured of 'meaning' rather than 'information'.

Luhmann attempted to apply Maturana and Varela's notion of autopoiesis to social systems. "A core concept of social systems theory is derived from biological systems theory: the concept of autopoiesis. Chilean biologist Humberto Maturana come up with the concept to explain how biological systems such as cells are a product of their own production." "Systems exist by way of operational closure and this means that they each construct themselves and their own realities."

== Educational aspects ==
The first definition of enaction was introduced by psychologist Jerome Bruner, who introduced enaction as 'learning by doing' in his discussion of how children learn, and how they can best be helped to learn. He associated enaction with two other ways of knowledge organization: Iconic and Symbolic.

"Any domain of knowledge (or any problem within that domain of knowledge) can be represented in three ways: by a set of actions appropriate for achieving a certain result (enactive representation); by a set of summary images or graphics that stand for a concept without defining it fully (iconic representation); and by a set of symbolic or logical propositions drawn from a symbolic system that is governed by rules or laws for forming and transforming propositions (symbolic representation)"

The term 'enactive framework' was elaborated upon by Francisco Varela and Humberto Maturana.

Sriramen argues that enactivism provides "a rich and powerful explanatory theory for learning and being." and that it is closely related to both the ideas of cognitive development of Piaget, and also the social constructivism of Vygotsky. Piaget focused on the child's immediate environment, and suggested cognitive structures like spatial perception emerge as a result of the child's interaction with the world. According to Piaget, children construct knowledge, using what they know in new ways and testing it, and the environment provides feedback concerning the adequacy of their construction. In a cultural context, Vygotsky suggested that the kind of cognition that can take place is not dictated by the engagement of the isolated child, but is also a function of social interaction and dialogue that is contingent upon a sociohistorical context. Enactivism in educational theory "looks at each learning situation as a complex system consisting of teacher, learner, and context, all of which frame and co-create the learning situation." Enactivism in education is very closely related to situated cognition, which holds that "knowledge is situated, being in part a product of the activity, context, and culture in which it is developed and used." This approach challenges the "separating of what is learned from how it is learned and used."

== Artificial intelligence aspects ==
The ideas of enactivism regarding how organisms engage with their environment have interested those involved in robotics and man-machine interfaces. The analogy is drawn that a robot can be designed to interact and learn from its environment in a manner similar to the way an organism does, and a human can interact with a computer-aided design tool or data base using an interface that creates an enactive environment for the user, that is, all the user's tactile, auditory, and visual capabilities are enlisted in a mutually explorative engagement, capitalizing upon all the user's abilities, and not at all limited to cerebral engagement. In these areas it is common to refer to affordances as a design concept, the idea that an environment or an interface affords opportunities for enaction, and good design involves optimizing the role of such affordances.

The activity in the AI community has influenced enactivism as a whole. Referring extensively to modeling techniques for evolutionary robotics by Beer, the modeling of learning behavior by Kelso, and to modeling of sensorimotor activity by Saltzman, McGann, De Jaegher, and Di Paolo discuss how this work makes the dynamics of coupling between an agent and its environment, the foundation of enactivism, "an operational, empirically observable phenomenon." That is, the AI environment invents examples of enactivism using concrete examples that, although not as complex as living organisms, isolate and illuminate basic principles.

== Criticism ==
One of the essential theses of this approach is that biological systems generate meanings, i.e. they are semiotic systems, engaging in transformational and not merely informational interactions. Since this thesis raised the problems of beginning cognition for organisms in the developmental stage of only simple reflexes (the binding problem and the problem of primary data entry), enactivists proposed the concept of embodied information that serves to start cognition. However, critics highlight that this idea requires introducing the nature of intentionality before engaging embodied information. In a natural environment, the stimulus-reaction pair (causation) is unpredictable due to many irrelevant stimuli claiming to be randomly associated with the embodied information. While embodied information is only beneficial when intentionality is already in place, enactivists introduced the notion of the generation of meanings by biological systems (engaging in transformational interactions) without introducing a neurophysiological basis of intentionality.

== See also ==
- Action-specific perception – Psychological theory on perception
- Autopoesis – System capable of producing itself
- Biosemiotics – Biology interpreted as a sign system
- Cognitive science – Interdisciplinary scientific study of cognitive processes
- Cognitive psychology – Subdiscipline of psychology
- Computational theory of mind – Family of views in the philosophy of mind
- Connectivism – Theory of learning in a digital age
- Cultural psychology – How cultures reflect and shape their psychology
- Distributed cognition – Psychologic theory
- Embodied cognition – Interdisciplinary theory
- Embodied embedded cognition – Theory in cognitive science
- Enactive interfaces – Interactive systems that allow organization and transmission of knowledge
- Extended cognition – Philosophy of mind where the mind resides beyond the brain and body
- Extended mind – Philosophy of mind where the mind resides beyond the brain and body
- Externalism#Enactivism and embodied cognition – Group of positions in the philosophy of mind
- Mind–body problem – Open question in philosophy of how abstract minds interact with physical bodies
- Phenomenology (philosophy) – Philosophical method and schools of philosophy
- Representationalism – Debate in the philosophy of mind
- Situated cognition – Hypothesis that knowing is inseparable from doing
- Social cognition – Study of cognitive processes involved in social interactions
