= Daniel Douglas =

Daniel Douglas may refer to:

- Daniel Douglas, an earlier pseudonym of Claude Cahun (1894–1954), French Surrealist photographer, sculptor, and writer
- Daniel Douglas Eley (1914–2015), British chemist
- Daniel Douglas Hutto, American philosopher
- Daniel Dunglas Home (1833–1886), Scottish medium
- Douglas Daniel Braga (born 1985), Brazilian footballer
