= Enactive interfaces =

Interactive systems that allow organization and transmission of knowledge

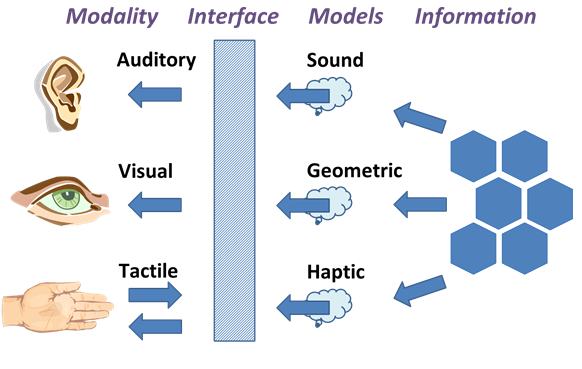
Enactive human-machine interface translating the aspects of a knowledge base into modalities of perception for a human operator. The auditory, visual, and tactile presentations by the system respond to tactile input from the operator, which user input in turn depends upon the auditory, visual, and tactile feedback from the system.

Enactive interfaces are interactive systems that allow organization and transmission of knowledge obtained through action. Examples are interfaces that couple a human with a machine to do things usually done unaided, such as shaping a three-dimensional object using multiple modality interactions with a database, or using interactive video to allow a student to visually engage with mathematical concepts. Enactive interface design can be approached through the idea of raising awareness of affordances, that is, optimization of the awareness of possible actions available to someone using the enactive interface. This optimization involves visibility, affordance, and feedback.

The enactive interface in the figure interprets manual input and provides a response in perceptual terms in the form of images, sounds, and haptic (tactile) feedback. The system is called enactive because of the feedback loop in which the system response is decided by the user input, and the user input is driven by the perceived system responses.

Enactive interfaces are new types of human-computer interface that express and transmit the enactive knowledge by integrating different sensory aspects. The driving concept of enactive interfaces is then the fundamental role of motor action for storing and acquiring knowledge (action driven interfaces). Enactive interfaces are then capable of conveying and understanding gestures of the user, in order to provide an adequate response in perceptual terms. Enactive interfaces can be considered a new step in the development of the human-computer interaction because they are characterized by a closed loop between the natural gestures of the user (efferent component of the system) and the perceptual modalities activated (afferent component). Enactive interfaces can be conceived to exploit this direct loop and the capability of recognizing complex gestures.

The development of such interfaces requires the creation of a common vision between different research areas like computer vision, haptic and sound processing, giving more attention on the motor action aspect of interaction. An example of prototypical systems that are able to introduce enactive interfaces are reactive robots, robots that are always in contact with the human hand (like current play console controllers, Wii Remote) and are capable of interpreting the human movements and guiding the human for the completion of a manipulation task.

== Enactive knowledge ==
Enactive knowledge is information gained through perception–action interaction in the environment. In many aspects the enactive knowledge is more natural than the other forms both in terms of the learning process and in the way it is applied in the world. Such knowledge is inherently multimodal because it requires the co-ordination of the various senses. Two key characteristics of enactive knowledge are that it is experential it relates to doing and depends on the user's experience, and it is cultural: the way of doing is itself dependent upon social aspects, attitudes, values, practices, and legacy.

Enactive interfaces are related to a fundamental interaction concept that often is not exploited by existing human-computer interface technologies. As stated by cognitive psychologist Jerome Bruner, the traditional interaction with the information mediated by a computer is mostly based on symbolic or iconic knowledge, and not on enactive knowledge. While in the symbolic way of learning knowledge is stored as words, mathematical symbols or other symbol systems, in the iconic stage knowledge is stored in the form of visual images, such as diagrams and illustrations that can accompany verbal information. On the other hand, enactive knowledge is a form of knowledge based on active participation, knowing by doing, by living rather than thinking.

"Any domain of knowledge (or any problem within that domain of knowledge) can be represented in three ways: by a set of actions appropriate for achieving a certain result (enactive representation); by a set of summary images or graphics that stand for a concept without defining it fully (iconic representation); and by a set of symbolic or logical propositions drawn from a symbolic system that is governed by rules or laws for forming and transforming propositions (symbolic representation)"

A particular form of knowledge is a skill, juggling being a simple example, and the acquisition of a skill is one area where enactive knowledge is evident. The sensorimotor and cognitive activities involved in acquiring skills are tabulated by the SKILLS FP6 European skills project.

== Modern applications ==
Enactive interfaces have found increasing application in emerging technologies. In the context of extended reality (XR), artificial intelligence (AI), and brain-computer interfaces (BCI), enactive principles are being applied to better account for human agency in interaction design. Research published in 2024 examined how enactive interaction supports creative learning in educational contexts, finding that immersive environments promote user initiative and active knowledge construction.

== Multimodal interfaces ==
Multimodal interfaces are a good candidate for the creation of Enactive interfaces because of their coordinated use of haptic, sound and vision. Such research is the main objective of the ENACTIVE Network of Excellence, a European consortium of more than 20 research laboratories that are joining their research effort for the definition, development and exploitation of enactive interfaces.

== ENACTIVE Network of Excellence ==
The research on enactive knowledge and enactive interfaces is the objective of the ENACTIVE Network of Excellence. A Network of Excellence is a European Community research instrument that provides fundings for the integration of the research activities of different research laboratories and institutions. The ENACTIVE NoE started in 2004 with more than 20 partners with the objective of the creation of a multidisciplinary research community with the aim of structuring the research on a new generation of human-computer interfaces called Enactive Interfaces. The aim of this NoE is not only the research on enactive interfaces by itself, but also the integration of the partners through a Virtual Laboratory and the spreading of the expertise and knowledge of the Network.

Since 2004, the partners, coordinated by the PERCRO laboratory, have improved both the theoretical aspects of enaction, through seminars and the creation of a lexicon, and the technological aspects necessary for the creation of enactive interfaces. Every year the status of the ENACTIVE NoE is presented through an international conference.

== See also ==
- Enactivism
