= Space Infantry =

Tabletop science fiction role-playing game

Space Infantry is a role-playing game published by D&R Game Design in 1982.

== Description ==
Space Infantry is a science-fiction system in which characters are space cadets in a future military setting.

== Publication history ==
Space Infantry was designed by Daniel Douglas Hutto and Roger Allen Esnard, and published by D&R Game Design in 1982 as a 68-page book.

== Reception ==
Tony Watson reviewed Space Infantry in Space Gamer No. 71. Watson commented that "I can't fault these designers for trying; despite everything about Space Infantry that I didn't like, there's a certain sincerity to the ideas presented here. The designers have a game, but there is definitely a problem in communicating it. I wonder how much better Space Infantry would have been had it had an outside and objective editor: then it might have been usable. As it is, I imagine that Space Infantry could be made into a workable roleplaying system where the gamemaster willing to use it as a base and do most of the design work himself. But the question is, why bother when one can start from scratch or pick up one of the infinitely superior systems already available? There's no question about one thing: Space Infantry is certainly one to pass up."
