= Ezequiel Di Paolo =

Research professor from Spain

Ezequiel A. Di Paolo
- Born: 1970 (age 55–56)
- Education: Instituto Balseiro; University of Sussex
- Scientific career
- Workplaces: Instituto Balseiro; University of Sussex; Ikerbasque
- Thesis: On the evolutionary and behavioral dynamics of social coordination (1999)
- Doctoral advisor: Phil Husbands
- Website: ezequieldipaolo.wordpress.com

Ezequiel A Di Paolo (born in Buenos Aires, 1970) is a full-time Research Professor at Ikerbasque, the Basque Foundation for Science. He also has affiliations with the Centre for Computational Neuroscience and Robotics at the University of Sussex. His field of research covers enactivism and embodiment in cognitive science.

== Education ==
Di Paolo studied Physics at the University of Buenos Aires and obtained a Master of Science degree in Nuclear Engineering from the Balseiro Institute in Argentina. He has a PhD degree in Computer Science and Artificial Intelligence from the University of Sussex.

== Academic work ==
His work includes research in embodied cognition, dynamical systems, adaptive behaviour in natural and artificial systems, biological modelling, complex systems, evolutionary robotics, and philosophy of science. His research is in the tradition established by Varela, Thompson and Rosch, which was an early example of the embodied, enactive approach to cognition.

Di Paolo believes that embodiment and enactivism have the potential to increase our understanding in traditional problems of cognition, and advocates that these alternative views should be explored and developed further, rather than being subsumed (or 'watered down') under more traditional frameworks, such as the cartesian dualistic model.

His promotion and exploration of embodiment and enactivism is carried on through his work in the academic consortium eSMCs, an EU-funded project to investigate the role of sensorimotor contingencies in cognition.

Additionally, he is involved in Centre for Life, Mind and Society, a research group spanning complex systems in biology and self-organising systems.

Other areas of his work include social cognition and intersubjectivity. He is involved as principal investigator with the Marie-Curie Initial Training Network TESIS — Towards an Embodied Science of InterSubjectivity.

He is Editor-in-Chief of the interdisciplinary journal Adaptive Behavior.

== Publications ==
- Di Paolo, E. A. "Organismically-inspired robotics: Homeostatic adaptation and natural teleology beyond the closed sensorimotor loop. In K. Murase & T. Asakura (Eds.), Dynamic Systems Approach for Embodiment and Sociality: From Ecological Psychology to Robotics, International series on advanced intelligence". Magill, South Australia: Advanced Knowledge International.
- Di Paolo, Ezequiel A. (11 April 2006). "Autopoiesis, Adaptivity, Teleology, Agency". Phenomenology and the Cognitive Sciences. 4 (4): 429–452. CiteSeerX 10.1.1.64.8054. doi:10.1007/s11097-005-9002-y. S2CID 15913928.
- De Jaegher, Hanne; Di Paolo, Ezequiel (2007). "Participatory sense-making". Phenomenology and the Cognitive Sciences. 6 (4): 485–507. doi:10.1007/s11097-007-9076-9. S2CID 142842155.
- Di Paolo, Ezequiel (2008). "Extended Life". Topoi. 28: 9–21. doi:10.1007/s11245-008-9042-3. S2CID 17439600.
- Di Paolo, E. A. (2010). Robotics inspired in the organism. Intellectica, 53-54, 129–162.
- De Jaegher, Hanne; Di Paolo, Ezequiel; Gallagher, Shaun (2010). "Can social interaction constitute social cognition?". Trends in Cognitive Sciences. 14 (10): 441–7. doi:10.1016/j.tics.2010.06.009. PMID 20674467. S2CID 476406.
- Bedia, Manuel G.; Di Paolo, Ezequiel (2012). "Unreliable Gut Feelings Can Lead to Correct Decisions: The Somatic Marker Hypothesis in Non-Linear Decision Chains". Frontiers in Psychology. 3: 384. doi:10.3389/fpsyg.2012.00384. PMC 3466990. PMID 23087655.
- Di Paolo, Ezequiel; De Jaegher, Hanne (2012). "The interactive brain hypothesis". Frontiers in Human Neuroscience. 6: 163. doi:10.3389/fnhum.2012.00163. PMC 3369190. PMID 22701412.
- De Jaegher, Hanne; Di Paolo, Ezequiel (2013). "Enactivism is not interactionism". Frontiers in Human Neuroscience. 6: 345. doi:10.3389/fnhum.2012.00345. PMC 3539800. PMID 23316153.
- Buhrmann, Thomas; Di Paolo, Ezequiel Alejandro; Barandiaran, Xabier (2013). "A Dynamical Systems Account of Sensorimotor Contingencies". Frontiers in Psychology. 4: 285. doi:10.3389/fpsyg.2013.00285. PMC 3664438. PMID 23750143.
- Cuffari, Elena Clare; Di Paolo, Ezequiel Alejandro; De Jaegher, Hanne (2014). "From participatory sense-making to language: there and back again". Phenomenology and the Cognitive Sciences. 14 (4): 1089–1125. doi:10.1007/s11097-014-9404-9.
- Barandiaran, Xabier E.; Di Paolo, Ezequiel A. (2014). "A genealogical map of the concept of habit". Frontiers in Human Neuroscience. 8: 522. doi:10.3389/fnhum.2014.00522. PMC 4104486. PMID 25100971.
- Di Paolo, Ezequiel Alejandro; Barandiaran, Xabier E.; Beaton, Michael; Buhrmann, Thomas (2014). "Learning to perceive in the sensorimotor approach: Piaget's theory of equilibration interpreted dynamically". Frontiers in Human Neuroscience. 8: 551. doi:10.3389/fnhum.2014.00551. PMC 4115614. PMID 25126065.
- Di Paolo, Ezequiel A. (2014). "The worldly constituents of perceptual presence". Frontiers in Psychology. 5: 450. doi:10.3389/fpsyg.2014.00450. PMC 4030179. PMID 24860544.
