= Neurophenomenology =

Research into the problem of consciousness

Neurophenomenology refers to a scientific research program aimed at addressing the hard problem of consciousness in a pragmatic way. It combines neuroscience with phenomenology to study experience, mind, and consciousness with an emphasis on the embodied condition of the human mind. The field is very much linked to fields such as neuropsychology, neuroanthropology, and behavioral neuroscience (also known as biopsychology) and the study of phenomenology in psychology.

== Overview ==
The label was coined by C. Laughlin, J. McManus, and E. d'Aquili in 1990. However, the term was appropriated and given a distinctive understanding by the cognitive neuroscientist Francisco Varela in the mid-1990s, whose work has inspired many philosophers and neuroscientists to continue with this new direction of research.

Phenomenology is a philosophical method of inquiry into everyday experience. The focus in phenomenology is on the examination of different phenomena (from Greek, phainomenon, "that which shows itself") as they appear to consciousness, i.e. in a first-person perspective. Thus, phenomenology is a discipline particularly useful for understanding how it is that appearances present themselves to us and how it is that we attribute meaning to them.

Neuroscience is the scientific study of the brain, and deals with the third-person aspects of consciousness. Some scientists studying consciousness believe that the exclusive utilization of either first- or third-person methods will not provide answers to the difficult questions of consciousness.

Historically, Edmund Husserl is regarded as the philosopher whose work made phenomenology a coherent philosophical discipline with a concrete methodology in the study of consciousness, namely the epoche. Husserl, who was a former student of Franz Brentano, thought that in the study of mind it was extremely important to acknowledge that consciousness is characterized by intentionality, a concept often explained as "aboutness"; consciousness is always consciousness of something. A particular emphasis on the phenomenology of embodiment was developed by philosopher Maurice Merleau-Ponty in the mid-20th century.

Naturally, phenomenology and neuroscience find a convergence of common interests. However, primarily because of ontological disagreements between phenomenology and philosophy of mind, the dialogue between these two disciplines is still a very controversial subject. Husserl himself was very critical of any attempt to "naturalize" philosophy, and his phenomenology was founded upon a criticism of empiricism, "psychologism", and "anthropologism" as contradictory standpoints in philosophy and logic. The influential critique of the ontological assumptions of computationalist and representationalist cognitive science, as well as artificial intelligence, made by philosopher Hubert Dreyfus has marked new directions for integration of neurosciences with an embodied ontology. The work of Dreyfus has influenced cognitive scientists and neuroscientists to study phenomenology and embodied cognitive science and/or enactivism. One such case is neuroscientist Walter Freeman, whose neurodynamical analysis has a marked Merleau-Pontyian approach.

== See also ==
- Antonio Damasio
- Autopoiesis
- Biogenetic structuralism
- Biosemiotics
- Embodied cognition
- Francisco Varela
- Hubert Dreyfus
- Neurosemiotics
- Walter Freeman
