= Cognition =

Mental process dealing with knowledge

Representation of a human brain thinking

Cognition encompasses mental processes that deal with knowledge. It includes psychological activities that acquire, store, retrieve, transform, or apply information. Cognitive processes are a fundamental part of mental life, helping individuals understand and interact with the world.

Cognitive processes are typically categorized by their function. Perception organizes and interprets sensory information, such as light and sound, to construct a coherent experience of objects and events. Attention prioritizes specific aspects while filtering out irrelevant information. Memory is the ability to retain, store, and retrieve information, including working memory and long-term memory. Thinking encompasses psychological activities in which concepts, ideas, and mental representations are considered and manipulated. It includes reasoning, concept formation, problem solving, and decision-making. Many cognitive activities deal with language, including language acquisition, comprehension, and production. Metacognitive processes deal with information about other mental processes, such as knowing that one can recall a specific memory. Classifications also distinguish between conscious and unconscious processes and between controlled and automatic ones.

There are many theories of the nature of cognition. Classical computationalism posits that cognitive processes manipulate symbols according to formal rules, similar to how computers execute algorithms. Connectionism models the mind as a complex network of nodes where information flows as they communicate with each other. Representationalism and anti-representationalism disagree about whether cognitive processes operate on internal representations of the world.

Many disciplines explore cognition, including psychology, neuroscience, and cognitive science. They examine different levels of abstraction and employ distinct methods of inquiry. Some scientists study cognitive development, investigating how mental abilities grow from infancy through adulthood. While cognitive research mostly focuses on humans, it also explores how other animals acquire knowledge and how artificial systems can emulate cognitive processes. The study of cognition has its roots in antiquity and has gained particular interdisciplinary prominence since the cognitive revolution starting in the 1950s.

== Definition ==
Cognitions are mental processes that deal with knowledge, involving the acquisition, transformation, storage, retrieval, and use of information. For example, these processes occur when reading an article, as sensory input about the text is acquired and preexisting linguistic knowledge is retrieved to interpret the text's meaning. This content is then transformed as different ideas are linked, resulting in the storage of information as memories and beliefs are formed.

Cognitions are a pervasive part of mental life, and many cognitive processes happen simultaneously. They are essential for understanding and interacting with the world by making individuals aware of their environment and helping them plan and execute appropriate responses. Thought is a characteristic form of cognition. It considers ideas, analyzes information, draws inferences, solves problems, and forms beliefs. However, cognition is not limited to abstract reasoning and encompasses diverse psychological processes, including perception, attention, memory, language, and decision-making. It is debated whether or under what conditions feelings, emotions, and other affects qualify as cognitions. Some controversial views associated with cognitivism argue that all mental phenomena are cognitions.

Cognitive activities can happen consciously, such as when a person deliberately analyzes a problem step by step. They can also take place unconsciously, such as automatic mechanisms responsible for language processing and facial recognition. Many fields of inquiry study cognition, including psychology, cognitive science, neuroscience, and philosophy. While research focuses primarily on the human mind, cognition is not limited to humans and encompasses animal and artificial forms.

The term cognition originates from the Indo-European root gnō-, meaning 'to know'. This root is present in the Latin term gnōscere, also meaning 'to know', which led to the formation of the verb cognōscere, meaning 'to learn, to understand'. Through its perfect participle cognitus, the Latin verb entered Middle English as cognicioun. The earliest documented use occurred in 1447, eventually evolving into the modern English word cognition.

== Types of cognitive processes ==
Cognitive processes encompass various types, each managing different information and performing distinct functions within the human mind. They are sometimes divided into basic processes, like perception and memory, and higher-order processes, like thinking. This distinction rests on the idea that higher-order processes could not occur without basic processes.

=== Perception and attention ===
Simplified model of cognitive processes associated with perception and memory

Perception is the organization and interpretation of sensory information about the world. It is a complex mental activity that involves the interplay of diverse cognitive processes, many of which occur automatically and unconsciously. It starts with physical stimuli, such as light or sound, which are detected by receptors and transmitted to the brain as electrical signals. These signals are processed in various brain regions to construct a coherent experience of distinct objects and events while situating them in a spatial-temporal framework.

Certain cognitive processes are responsible for detecting basic features in sensory data, such as edges, colors, and pitches, while others process spatial location. Object recognition is another function that compares this information with stored representations in search of known patterns, such as recognizing a familiar landmark or identifying a specific melody. Some cognitive faculties are specialized for tasks only relevant to particular perceptual contents, such as face recognition and language processing.

Cognitive processes responsible for perception rely on various heuristics to simplify problems and reduce cognitive labor. For example, visual perception often assumes that the size, shape, and color of objects remain constant to ensure a consistent view despite changes in perspective or lighting. Heuristics sometimes lead to inaccurate or illusory perceptions.

Different forms of perception are associated with distinct types of stimuli and receptors. Visual perception—the detection and interpretation of light—is a primary source of knowledge about the external environment for humans. Other forms of perception include hearing, touch, smell, and taste. Data from these different modalities are integrated by higher-order cognitive processes to form a unified and coherent experience of the world. Although sensory data is a central factor of perceptual experience, it is not the only factor, and various other forms of information influence the underlying cognitive operations. For instance, memories from earlier experiences determine which objects are experienced as familiar. Other factors include the expectations, goals, background knowledge, and belief system of the individual.

Attention is a central aspect of mental processes that focuses cognitive resources on certain stimuli or features. It involves the selection or prioritization of specific aspects while filtering out irrelevant information. For example, attention is responsible for the cocktail party effect, in which the brain isolates a single conversation while relegating surrounding noise to the background. The selection process is crucial since the total amount of information is typically too vast for the brain to process all at once. It ensures that the most important features are prioritized. Attention is not limited to perception but is also present in other cognitive processes, such as remembering and thinking.

=== Memory and learning ===
Memory is the ability to retain, store, and retrieve information. It includes the capacity to consciously recall past experiences and is central to many other cognitive activities that rely on stored data to process information and coordinate behavior. Memory processes have three stages: an input phase where new information is acquired, a storage phase preserving the information for future access, and an output phase retrieving the information and making it available to other cognitive operations. Different types of memory are distinguished by the function they perform and the type of information on which they operate.

Working memory stores information temporarily, making it available to other cognitive processes while allowing manipulation of the stored information. During mental arithmetic, for example, the working memory holds and updates intermediate results while calculations are performed. The term is sometimes used interchangeably with the term short-term memory, which is defined by brief retention without the emphasis on dynamic manipulation. Long-term memory, by contrast, retains information for long periods, in some cases indefinitely. During storage, the information is not actively considered. However, it remains available for retrieval, like when recalling a childhood memory. Passive exposure to information is usually not sufficient for the effective formation and retrieval of long-term memories. Relevant factors include the level and type of engagement with the content: for example, the attention, emotion, mood, and context in which the information is processed.

Long-term memory is typically divided into episodic, semantic, and procedural memory based on the type of information involved. Episodic memory deals with information about past personal experiences and events. New memories are stored as a person undergoes experiences and can be accessed later, either by accessing factual information about the events or by mentally reliving them. For example, remembering one's last holiday trip involves episodic memory. Semantic memory deals with organized knowledge about the world not linked to specific experiences, such as general knowledge about facts and concepts. For instance, the information that water freezes at 0 °C is stored in semantic memory.

Procedural memory handles practical knowledge of how to do things. It encompasses learned skills that can be executed, like the ability to ride a bicycle or to type on a keyboard. As a form of know-how, procedural memory is distinct from the capacity to verbally describe the exact procedure involved in the execution, like explaining how to maintain balance on a bicycle. For this reason, procedural memory is categorized as non-declarative or implicit memory, which operates automatically and cannot be consciously accessed. Episodic and semantic memory, by contrast, belong to declarative or explicit memory, which encompasses information that can be consciously recalled and described.

The different forms of memory play a central role in learning, which involves the acquisition of novel information, skills, or habits, as well as refining existing knowledge and skills. Learning occurs through experience and enables individuals to adapt to their environment. It happens either intentionally, such as through studying or practicing, or unintentionally as an unconscious side effect of engaging in other tasks. A central aspect of effective learning is the formation of memory connections, which link different pieces of information and facilitate their retrieval.

=== Thinking ===
Thinking is a mental activity in which concepts, ideas, and mental representations are considered and manipulated. Many cognitive processes fall into this category, including reasoning, concept formation, problem solving, and decision-making.

Logical reasoning deals with information in the form of statements by inferring a conclusion from a set of premises. It proceeds in a rigorous and norm-governed manner to ensure that the conclusion is rationally convincing and supported by the premises. Logical reasoning encompasses deductive and non-deductive reasoning. Deductive reasoning follows strict rules of inference, providing the strongest support: the conclusion of a deductive inference cannot be false if all the premises are true. An example is the syllogism from the premises "all men are mortal" and "Socrates is a man" to the conclusion "Socrates is mortal". Non-deductive reasoning aims to make a conclusion rationally convincing but does not guarantee its truth. For instance, inductive reasoning infers a general law from many individual observations, like concluding that all ravens are black based on observations of numerous black ravens. Abductive reasoning, another type of non-deductive reasoning, seeks the best explanation of a phenomenon. For example, a doctor uses abductive reasoning when they infer that a child has chickenpox as an explanation of the child's skin rash and fever.

Through concept formation, the mind learns to identify common patterns among diverse instances.

Problem-solving is a goal-directed activity that aims to overcome obstacles and arrive at a pre-defined objective. This happens, for instance, when determining the best route for an upcoming trip. Problem-solving starts with comprehending the problem, which typically involves an understanding of the initial state, the goal state, and the obstacles or constraints that hinder progress. Some problems are well-structured and have precise solution paths. For ill-structured problems, by contrast, it is not possible to determine which exact steps will be successful. Divergent thinking is an approach to problem-solving that generates many possible solutions. It is usually combined with convergent thinking, which evaluates the different options and eliminates unfeasible ones. Thought often relies on heuristics or general rules to find and compare possible solutions. A common heuristic is to divide a problem into several simpler subproblems. Another heuristic is to adapt strategies that were successful for similar problems encountered earlier.

Closely related to problem-solving, decision-making is the cognitive process of choosing between courses of action. To determine the best alternative, it weighs the different options by assessing their advantages and disadvantages—for example, by considering their positive and negative consequences. According to expected utility theory, a decision is rational if it selects the option with the highest expected benefit, which is determined by the probability and the value of each consequence. To assess the probability of an outcome, people use various heuristics, such as the representativeness heuristic (judging by similarity to prototypes), the availability heuristic (privileging easily accessible information), and anchoring (relying on reference points).

Different forms of thinking rely on concepts, which are general ideas or mental representations to sort objects into classes, like the concepts animal and table. Concept formation is the process of acquiring a new concept by learning to identify its instances and grasping its relation to other concepts. This process helps individuals organize information and make sense of the world. Psychologists distinguish between logical and natural concepts. Logical concepts have precise definitions and rules of application, like the concept triangle. Natural concepts, by contrast, are based on resemblance but lack exact definitions or clear-cut boundaries, like the concept table.

=== Language ===
A language, such as English, Japanese, or American Sign Language, is a structured communication system based on symbols and rules to share information and coordinate action. Language plays a central role in everyday life and influences other cognitive processes, but there are disagreements about the extent of these influences. The Whorfian hypothesis and the thesis of linguistic relativity propose pervasive influences, arguing that language shapes thought patterns and that speakers of distinct languages think differently. Many cognitive processes are involved in the acquisition, comprehension, and production of linguistic expressions.

Language acquisition happens naturally in early childhood through exposure to a linguistic environment. It is a complex process since the system of spoken language is made up of several layers. At the fundamental level are basic sounds or sound units. They usually do not have linguistic meaning themselves but are combined into words, which refer to diverse things and ideas. (Note: Sound units are called phonemes. The smallest linguistic units to carry meaning are morphemes. Some morphemes can function independently as words, while others only occur as modifications, such as prefixes.) Words are combined into sentences by following the rules of grammar. This system makes it possible to form and comprehend an infinite number of sentences based on knowledge of a finite number of words and rules. The exact meaning of sentences usually depends also on the context in which they are used. Although distinct languages can differ significantly in their general structure, there are some universal cognitive patterns that underlie all human languages.

Language comprehension is the process of understanding spoken, written, and signed language. It involves the coordination of various cognitive skills to recognize words, consult memory to access their meanings, analyze sentence structures, and use contextual information to interpret their implications. Additional difficulties come from lexical and structural ambiguities, in which a word or a sentence can be associated with multiple meanings. To resolve ambiguities, individuals rely on background knowledge about the overall topic and the speaker to discern the intended meaning. As a result, language comprehension depends not only on bottom-up processes, which start with sensory information, but also on top-down processes, which integrate general knowledge and expectations. For example, expectations cause longer processing times if a familiar word occurs in a context where the audience did not expect it.

While language comprehension seeks to uncover the meaning of pre-existing linguistic messages, language production involves the inverse process of generating linguistic expressions to convey thoughts. Before a statement can be precisely formulated, speakers construct a general idea of what they wish to express, and a rough sentence pattern of how to communicate it. Speakers then cognitively search for words that match the concepts they wish to convey. This activity, known as lexicalization, is divided into two stages: the identification of an abstract idea of the intended meaning, followed by the retrieval of the phonological form needed to pronounce the word. (Note: Tip of the tongue phenomena exemplify this distinction: the first stage of meaning identification succeeds, while the second stage of phonological retrieval fails.) As speakers string together words to generate a sentence, they consider the grammatical category of each word, like the contrast between nouns and adjectives, to align with the intended overall sentence structure. Additionally, the context of the conversation and the assumed background knowledge of the audience influence the selection of words and sentence structures.

=== Others ===
Cognitive processes can be conscious or unconscious. Conscious processes, such as attentively solving a math problem step by step or recalling a vivid memory, involve active awareness. Unconscious processes, such as the low-level processes underlying face recognition and language processing, operate automatically without the individual's awareness. Phenomenal consciousness involves a qualitative experience of mental phenomena, whereas access consciousness is an awareness of information that is available for use but not actively experienced at the moment. Various theories of the cognitive function of consciousness have been proposed. One asserts that consciousness integrates diverse forms of data and makes information widely available to different subsystems. Other theories argue that consciousness improves social interaction by fostering self-awareness in social contexts or that consciousness allows for increased flexibility and control, particularly in novel situations.

A related distinction is between controlled and automatic processes. Controlled processes are actively guided by the individual's intentions, such as when a person deliberately shifts attention from one object of perception to another. These processes are flexible and adaptable to new situations but require more cognitive resources. Automatic processes, by contrast, happen unconsciously, are effortless, and require fewer cognitive resources. By becoming familiar with a task, a process that was initially controlled can become automatic, freeing up resources for other activities. For example, as a novice driver becomes experienced, they can automatically handle the car and adapt to road and traffic conditions while gaining the ability to engage in a conversation at the same time.

Metacognitive processes deal with information about other cognitive processes.

Consciousness is closely related to metacognition, which encompasses any knowledge or cognitive process that deals with information about cognition. Some forms of metacognition only manage or store information about other aspects of cognition, like knowing that one can recall a specific memory. Others play an active role in monitoring and regulating ongoing processes, like changing a problem-solving strategy upon realizing that the previous one was ineffective. Metacognitive skills tend to improve the performance of other cognitive skills, particularly when dealing with complex tasks.

Social cognitions are mental activities through which individuals make sense of social phenomena. They include diverse types, such as the recognition of faces and facial expressions, the interpretation of intentions and behavior, and the evaluation of social cues and dynamics. A central topic in this field is theory of mind—the ability to understand others as mental beings with emotions, desires, and beliefs different from one's own. This ability allows individuals to think about and respond to the mental states of others. Moral cognitions are a type of social cognition that make individuals aware of the moral significance of situations. They occur when people recognize and appreciate altruistic behavior or disapprove of malicious and harmful actions. Cognitive psychologists also study the relation between cognition and emotion—for example, how emotions influence mental operations like attention and decision-making.

Cognitive processes do not always function as they should, and can lead to inaccuracies, either because of natural errors associated with cognitive biases or as a result of pathological impairments from cognitive disorders. Cognitive biases are systematic ways in which human thinking deviates from ideal norms of rationality. They are common patterns that affect most people, leading to misinterpretations of reality and suboptimal decisions. Cognitive biases are often caused by heuristics or mental shortcuts, which the brain uses to increase speed and reduce cognitive load. For instance, people typically rely on information that easily comes to mind when assessing a situation while disregarding more relevant information that is harder to retrieve.

Cognitive disorders involve a more pronounced deviation from typical mental functioning. High-level cognitive abilities usually require the interaction of many low-level processes. Impairments affecting a specific subprocess often result in a partial malfunction of the high-level process while leaving its other functions intact. For example, prosopagnosia is a perceptual disorder in which individuals struggle to recognize faces, although their other visual abilities remain unaffected. Similarly, anterograde amnesia is an impaired ability to form and recall new memories but leaves long-term memory intact. Disorders can affect a wide range of mental functions, including thought and language. Some disorders involve a general cognitive decline that is not limited to one specific function. For instance, Alzheimer's disease is associated with a widespread, gradual impairment of memory, reasoning, and language.

== Theories ==
Various theories of the nature of cognition have been proposed. They provide conceptualizations and models to represent cognitive processes, explain empirical data, and predict experimental outcomes. Some theories propose interpretations of the overall cognitive architecture (Note: A cognitive architecture is a model or framework of cognition. It describes how different components and processes interact to explain human cognition or to serve as a blueprint for artificial systems.) of the mind, seeking to explain cognition as a whole. Others suggest more limited models intended only for specific mental activities, such as theories of visual attention.

=== Classical computationalism ===
Computationalism asserts that cognition is a type of computation, highlighting the similarities between minds and computers. In its classical form, it argues that the brain represents information through strings of symbols. It treats thought as symbol manipulation: cognitions operate on strings to create new strings. A key feature of this model is that cognitive processes follow mechanical rules that depend on the syntactic structure of symbol strings without considering what the symbols represent. In this regard, individual processes work similarly to an electronic calculator that transforms the string "3 + 7" into the result "10" according to the mechanical rules of arithmetic without grasping the meaning of these numerals. Theories extend this symbol-based approach with more sophisticated devices of knowledge representation, such as semantic nets, schemata, and frames, to explain how the mind handles complex data involving many entities and relations.

According to classical computationalism, any cognitive activity is at its fundamental level a formal symbol manipulation, including perception, reasoning, planning, and language processing. Researchers using this perspective analyze and distinguish cognitive processes by examining the types of representations involved and the mechanical rules followed. The tri-level hypothesis divides this study into three levels of abstraction. The highest level analyzes the goal or purpose of a process, identifying the information it receives, the problem it aims to solve, and the result it produces. The intermediary level decomposes the process into individual steps, analyzing how the computation is performed or which algorithm is used. The most concrete level explores how the algorithm is implemented on a material level through neurological systems.

Classical computationalism is closely related to the information-processing approach, which assumes that most cognitive activities are complex processes arising from the interaction of several subprocesses. Each process is characterized by the function it performs, which is connected to the input information it obtains, how it transforms this information, and the output it generates. Interaction happens when the output of one subprocess acts as the input for another. This approach is associated with serial models in which complex computations are divided into sequences of calculations where intermediary results are computed and transmitted until a final output is produced. It typically divides the mind into a small number of high-level systems responsible for different tasks, such as perception, memory, and reasoning. Information-processing models often rely on a hierarchical cognitive architecture where a central system integrates information from other units and formulates overall goals.

The language of thought hypothesis is a version of classical computationalism arguing that thought happens through the medium of an internal linguistic system, termed mentalese, similar to natural languages such as English. According to this view, internal symbols and their combination into strings are like words and sentences composed according to the rules of grammar. The language of thought hypothesis suggests that mental states like beliefs and desires are realized as mentalese sentences and that cognitive operations manipulate these sentences according to specific rules to transform or extract information.

Some symbol-based approaches use formal logic as a model of cognition. According to this view, internal representations have the form of statements, similar to declarative sentences. Computational processes are conceptualized as rules of inference, which take one or more sentences as input and produce a new sentence as output. For example, modus ponens is a rule of inference that, when applied to the premises "if it rains, then the ground is wet" and "it rains", yields the conclusion "the ground is wet".

A similar approach interprets cognition as the application of if–then rules to generate new representations. According to this outlook, a cognitive system is made up of many rules, each defined by one or more conditions together with an output procedure. If information stored in the working memory satisfies all the conditions of a rule, then its output procedure is triggered and transfers a new representation to the working memory. This change may, in turn, prompt the execution of another rule, leading to a dynamic sequence of operations that can solve complex computational tasks. The cognitive architecture Soar is an example of this approach.

=== Connectionism ===
Connectionism analyzes cognition through complex neural networks consisting of several layers of nodes.

Connectionism is another form of computationalism that differs from classical computationalism in various ways. It agrees that cognitions are computations but proposes a different cognitive architecture based on a complex network of nodes. The nodes are locally linked to each other, and the activity of each node depends on the inputs it receives from connected nodes. The nodes are organized into layers, with information flowing in one direction from input to output layers. The initial input layer of nodes receives information, such as sensory data, and passes it on to intermediary layers, where the main computation takes place. At the end of the process is an output layer, which transmits the result to other systems. The behavior of each individual node is usually relatively simple: it receives the input values from the nodes of the previous layer, uses this information to compute its own activation level, and transmits this value to nodes in the subsequent layer. Complex computations emerge as numerous nodes operate in parallel and interact across layers.

Connectionists typically reject the serial and hierarchical models common in classical computationalism. Instead, they argue that cognition happens in parallel as countless neurons work simultaneously without a central control system guiding the process. Another difference is that connnectionism focuses on non-symbolic processes: the activations of individual nodes perform computations without the use of symbols. Accordingly, connectionism and classical computationalism are often characterized as competing paradigms that propose incompatible cognitive architectures. However, they do not necessarily exclude each other. For example, implementation connectionism argues that non-symbolic processes can implement symbolic processes. This view holds that the cognitive system functions as a neural network at the fundamental level and as a symbol-processor at a higher level of abstraction. Radical connectionism, by contrast, asserts that symbol-based approaches are fundamentally flawed and misconstrue the nature of cognition.

To reduce complexity, cognitive scientists often rely on idealized models that focus on activation levels and connections between nodes. These models typically ignore the underlying neurophysiological mechanisms in the brain. In this regard, there are various parallels between connectionist models of the mind and the neural networks employed in the field of artificial intelligence, for example, concerning the application of node networks to solve specific cognitive tasks and the problem of learning algorithms. Computational neuroscience, by contrast, directly integrates neurological data about the electrochemical activity of neurons into theories, which usually results in more complex models.

=== Representationalism and anti-representationalism ===
Both classical computationalism and some forms of connectionism (Note: It is debated whether all forms of connectionism involve representations.) accept representationalism, which holds that information is stored in representations that depict the state of the world. Representations can take various forms, such as symbols, images, and concepts, as well as non-symbolic patterns used to model higher-level structures. Representationalists examine how cognitive systems encode, manipulate, and decode representations to construct internal models of the environment and predict changes.

Anti-representationalists reject the idea that cognition is about representing the world through internal models. They assert that intelligence arises from the interaction between an organism and its environment rather than from internal processes alone. For example, some approaches in behaviorism and situated robotics suggest a more immediate link between perception and action: environmental stimuli are directly processed and translated into behavior following stimulus–response patterns without constructing detailed internal representations. This outlook suggests that intelligent behavior emerges if an entity has stimulus–response patterns that match the external situation, even if the cognitive system responsible for these patterns has no representations of what the environment is like.

Anti-representationalism is closely related to 4E cognition, a family of views critical of prioritizing internal representations. 4E cognition examines the relation between mind, body, and environment through four approaches: embodied, embedded, extended, and enactive cognition. Embodied cognition is the idea that cognitive processes are grounded in bodily experience and cannot be understood in isolation from the organism's sensorimotor capacities. Embedded cognition asserts that cognitive effort and efficiency depend on physical and social environments. Extended cognition claims that the environment not only influences cognition but forms part of it, meaning that cognitive processes extend beyond internal neural activity to include external events. Enactive cognition asserts that cognition arises from the interaction between organism and environment.

=== Other theories ===
The modularity of mind is an approach that analyzes the cognitive system in terms of independent mental modules. Each module is an inborn mechanism that deals only with a specific type of information while being mostly unaware of the activities of other modules. Mental modules are primarily used to explain low-level cognitive activities, such as edge detection in visual perception. The massive modularity hypothesis, by contrast, asserts that the mind is entirely composed of modules. According to this view, mental modules are also responsible for high-level cognitive processes by linking and integrating the outputs of low-level cognitive processes.

Bayesianism uses probability theory to model cognitive activities such as learning, vision, and motor control. Its central idea is that representations of the environment have degrees of uncertainty. It uses probability theory to deal with this uncertainty and handle incoming information. Bayesianism is sometimes combined with predictive models. According to these, the brain predicts outcomes, checks them against reality, and updates its internal model accordingly.

Dual process theory relies on the distinction between automatic and controlled processes to analyze cognitive phenomena. It conceptualizes them as two systems and proposes different models of their interaction. According to the default-interventionist model, the automatic system generates intuitive judgments while the controlled system monitors them and intervenes if it detects problems. The parallel-competitive model, by contrast, suggests that each system generates its own type of knowledge and that the outputs of the different systems compete with each other.

Various theories of cognition are discussed in ancient Indian philosophy, often inspired by Vedic scriptures that were composed roughly between 1500 and 600 BCE. Many propose that the mind is divided into different faculties that deal with specific cognitive processes. For example, manas is often understood as the sensory mind responsible for receiving and interpreting information from the external senses, while buddhi is typically described as the intellect engaged in judgment, reasoning, and decision-making. Related debates address the sources of knowledge, called pramana, such as perception, inference, and testimony. Ancient Chinese thought emphasized the connection between cognition and behavior. These ideas originated prior to the Qin period (i.e., before 221 BCE) and anticipated later theories of enactive cognition.

== Development ==
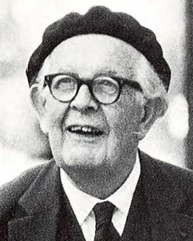
Jean Piaget divided the cognitive development of children into four stages.

Cognitive development is the progressive growth of mental abilities from infancy through adulthood as individuals acquire and improve cognitive skills and learn from experience. Some changes occur continuously as gradual improvements over extended periods. Others involve discontinuous transitions in the form of abrupt reorganizations resulting in qualitative changes. They are typically conceptualized as stages through which the individual passes.

Various theories of the general mechanisms and stages of cognitive development have been proposed. Jean Piaget (1896–1980) divided the process into four stages, each marked by an increasing capacity for abstraction and systematic understanding. (Note: Despite its influence on subsequent research, various aspects of his theory have been criticized as inaccurate or incomplete.) In the initial sensory-motor stage, from birth to about two years, children explore sensory impressions and motor capacities, learning that things continue to exist when not observed. During the pre-operational stage, up to about age seven, children begin to understand and use symbols intuitively. In the following stages of concrete and formal operation, children first apply logical reasoning to concrete physical objects and then, from around age twelve, also to abstract ideas.

In contrast to Piaget's approach, Lev Vygotsky (1896–1934) argued that social interaction is the primary driver of cognitive development without clearly demarcated stages. This theory holds that children learn new skills by engaging in tasks under the guidance of knowledgeable others. It emphasizes the role of language acquisition, suggesting that children internalize language and use it in private speech as a tool for planning, self-regulation, and problem solving. Other approaches examine the role of different types of representation in cognitive development. For example, Annette Karmiloff-Smith (1938–2016) proposed that cognitive development involves a shift from implicit to explicit representations, making knowledge more complex and easier to access. A further theory, proposed by Robert S. Siegler (born 1949), asserts that children use multiple cognitive strategies to solve problems and become more adept at selecting effective strategies as they develop.

Some influences on cognitive development occur before birth, due to factors like nutrition, maternal stress, and harmful substances like alcohol during pregnancy. Developments are most rapid during childhood and affect all major cognitive faculties, including perception, memory, thinking, and language. Cognitive changes also happen during adulthood but are less pronounced. In old age, overall cognition declines, affecting reasoning, comprehension, novel problem solving, and memory.

The nature versus nurture debate addresses the causes of cognitive development, contrasting the influences of inborn dispositions with the effects of environment and experience. Empiricists identify environment and experience as the main factors. This view is inspired by John Locke's idea that the mind of an infant is a blank slate that initially knows nothing of the world. According to this outlook, children learn through sense data by associating and generalizing impressions. Nativists, by contrast, argue that the mind has innate knowledge of abstract patterns. They suggest that this inborn framework organizes sensory information and guides learning. Contemporary approaches integrate ideas from both perspectives, moving beyond a polarizing opposition between empiricism and nativism.

== Non-human ==
=== Animal ===
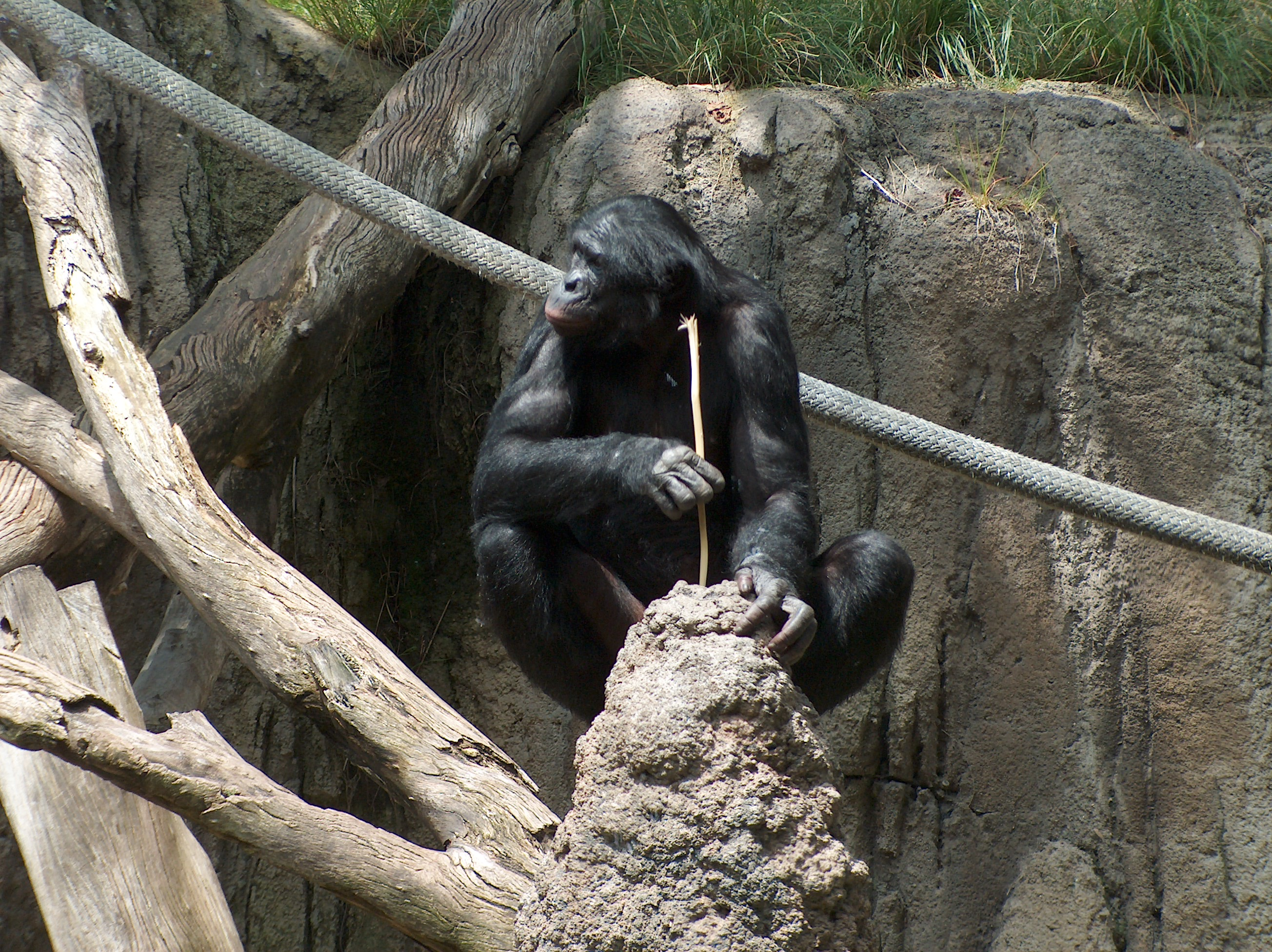
The ability to employ tools is an example of animal cognition, such as a bonobo fishing for termites with a stick.

Animal cognition encompasses the mechanisms by which animals acquire, process, and use information to guide flexible, goal-directed behavior. Animals use cognitive abilities for many daily tasks—for example, to find and recognize food, navigate territory, seek shelter, hunt prey, avoid predators, interact socially, communicate, learn new habits, and form long-term memories. Researchers examine cognition across diverse species, including mammals, birds, fish, and insects. The cognitive abilities of different species are usually tied to the specific ecological and social challenges they encounter in life. More general abilities are primarily found in animals with larger brains and incur higher energetic costs, posing a trade-off between energy investment and behavioral flexibility.

Researchers examine various areas of animal cognition. To study the ability to form abstract concepts, they examine whether an animal can grasp a category through generalization and apply it to cases not encountered before. For instance, chimpanzees can learn concepts of different numbers. As a result, they acquire various number-related abilities, like identifying collections containing a specific number of items. Another often-studied capacity is the ability to form and remember a spatial map of the environment. This enables animals, such as jays, to navigate efficiently and choose the shortest route to a shelter or a feeding site. Research also addresses imitation, in which an animal copies the behavior of another animal. This facilitates the spread of useful skills, including tool use. Beyond animal cognition, some researchers also examine plant cognition as a form of information processing resulting in adaptive, flexible, or goal-directed responses to the environment. For example, maple trees use plant communication: they release airborne chemicals to warn nearby trees of a herbivore attack, helping them prepare defensive responses. The extent of the cognitive capacities of plants is disputed, and researchers are typically skeptical about the presence of higher functions like consciousness.

Comparative cognition is the study of the similarities and differences in cognitive abilities across species. It is an interdisciplinary field of inquiry that also considers evolutionary factors. For example, researchers investigate which cognitive traits are required to solve particular socioecological problems and how these traits evolved in different species. A key topic in this field is the problem of anthropomorphism or the tendency to ascribe human cognitive qualities to animals. For instance, researchers have to decide whether social behavior in chimpanzees indicates the human-like ability to understand the mental states of other individuals or can be explained through simpler mechanisms. These challenges relate closely to anthropocentrism—the tendency to regard human cognition as exceptional and superior to that of other animals.

=== Artificial ===
Artificial cognition uses computational systems to emulate and model cognitive processes, like perception and reasoning, with central applications in artificial intelligence and robotics. Artificial and human cognition have different strengths and weaknesses. For example, artificial cognition excels at rapidly processing vast datasets according to predefined algorithms. Human cognition, by contrast, is typically better suited to assess emotional significance and to find and evaluate solutions that require novel and creative thinking. These differences affect how the two forms of cognition are integrated with each other. For some applications, artificial cognition is used to assist human cognition. In aviation, for example, automated systems monitor flight parameters and analyze environmental conditions, including turbulence prediction, allowing human pilots to focus on decision-making rather than data analysis. However, there are also cases where artificial cognition replaces human cognition, such as autonomous vehicle navigation.

The field of artificial cognitive systems explores the possibility of autonomous machines with human-like cognition. This encompasses not only artificial intelligence at the level of individual tasks, such as object detection or language translation, but also the integration of diverse cognitive processes. The aim is an embodied system that can autonomously interact with its environment in real time. An artificial cognitive system can navigate its surroundings, set goals, devise means to achieve them, anticipate outcomes, adapt to circumstances, execute action plans, and learn from experience. Artificial general intelligence, a closely related concept, refers to hypothetical systems that possess or surpass the full range of human mental abilities. It is controversial whether such a system can be fully realized since it would include not only computational capacities associated with logical reasoning but also emotion and phenomenal consciousness.

== In various fields ==
Many fields of inquiry study cognition, including psychology, neuroscience, and cognitive science. They examine different aspects of cognition, ranging from high-level computational processes to low-level neural mechanisms, and employ distinct methods to reach their conclusions. There is substantial overlap among these disciplines, and researchers from one field often rely on conceptual models or empirical findings from another.

=== Psychology ===
Cognitive psychology examines mental activities responsible for cognitive phenomena and intelligent behavior. It uses the scientific method to study cognitive processes like perception, memory, reasoning, and language. Although mental activities mediate between stimuli and responses, they are not directly observable, which poses a methodological challenge for researchers. It typically forces them to rely on indirect methods for empirical validation, usually in the form of models or theories that have testable predictions. For example, if a theory predicts a specific behavior in a particular situation, then empirical observations can determine if outcomes align with those predictions.

Cognitive psychologists use diverse methods to gather data for empirical validation. Experimental methods create controlled situations in which certain factors, called independent variables, can be changed. The main interest is in how these factors influence individuals in the situation. By measuring the effects, called dependent variables, researchers aim to identify causal relations between independent and dependent variables. Correlational methods, by contrast, measure the degree of association between two variables without proving that one causes the other. Cognitive psychologists also integrate methods from other disciplines, including neuroimaging techniques and computational simulations. Early cognitive psychologists, such as Wilhelm Wundt, made extensive use of introspection, in which researchers examine and reflect on their own experiences to understand mental processes. The choice of method depends on the studied cognitive process and can differ markedly between areas like perception and memory.

=== Neuroscience ===
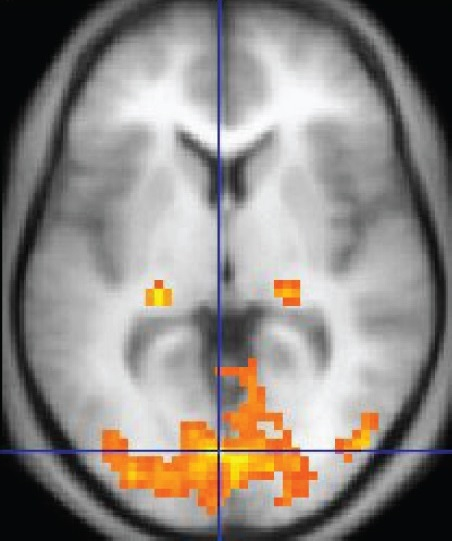
fMRI is a neuroimaging technique that can measure regional brain activity corresponding to specific cognitive tasks.

Cognitive neuroscience investigates how the nervous system gives rise to cognition. It is particularly interested in the brain, covering both micro-scale studies of individual neurons and synapses as well as the macro-scale analyses of interactions between brain regions. For example, cognitive neuroscientists study the brain areas responsible for processes like memory and decision-making, exploring how they represent and transform information and communicate with each other on a biological level. They also examine how these processes are influenced by neurotransmitters—signalling molecules that affect information exchange between neurons.

Cognitive neuroscientists employ neuroimaging techniques to study brain activity, including electroencephalography (EEG), positron emission tomography (PET), and functional magnetic resonance imaging (fMRI). These techniques visualize neural processes by measuring phenomena such as electrical or magnetic changes and blood flow across different brain areas, indicating local activity levels. Researchers compare the activation patterns associated with specific mental tasks to learn how regional brain activity correlates with cognitive demands. Another method examines patients with brain damage to infer the role of a brain area by observing how cognition changes when the area is impaired.

A different approach, common in computational or theoretical neuroscience, is to design computational or mathematical models of cognitive systems. This approach explores possible explanations of observed mental phenomena and neural activities by modeling and simulating underlying brain mechanisms.

=== Cognitive science ===
Cognitive science is an interdisciplinary field informed by psychology, neuroscience, philosophy, linguistics, and artificial intelligence. It seeks to integrate the insights of these disciplines and provide a unified perspective. To this end, it adopts a common conceptualization of minds as information processors, understanding cognition as the manipulation of internal representations.

To bridge disciplinary and methodological divides between the different fields, it identifies distinct levels of analysis corresponding to different degrees of abstraction. For example, neuroscientific analysis of the electrochemical activity of brain areas belongs to a concrete level that deals with the biological mechanisms performing computations. By contrast, the psychological study of the roles of and interactions between high-level processes, such as perception, memory, and reasoning, adopts an abstract perspective. Cognitive scientists seek to connect experimental findings with explanations and models to produce testable theories that link the different levels.

=== Other fields ===
Many fields of inquiry have subareas dedicated to cognitive phenomena. For example, cognitive linguistics is a subarea of linguistics that investigates the relation between language and cognition. It studies the cognitive processes responsible for grammar, conceptualization, language comprehension, and language production. Similarly, cognitive anthropology examines the connection between culture and cognition, conceptualizing culture as a system of knowledge, beliefs, and values. It analyzes and compares cultural systems from this perspective to identify distinctive features of particular societies and the universal patterns shared by all. Cognitive sociology, a related field, explores how sociocultural factors shape cognitive activity. Other fields include cognitive archaeology and cognitive biology.

Various branches of philosophy address cognition, including philosophy of mind and epistemology. Philosophers of mind examine the nature of cognition and related concepts, such as mind, representation, and consciousness. They are particularly interested in the relation between the mind and the body and the problem of how physical states can give rise to conscious experience. Epistemologists seek to understand the nature and limits of knowledge. They further ask under what conditions cognitive processes, such as perception and reasoning, lead to knowledge. Philosophers also reflect on the fields of inquiry studying cognition. They explore how psychologists, neuroscientists, and cognitive scientists conduct research and ask about the fundamental concepts and background assumptions underlying these fields.

Education studies examine the nature, purposes, practices, and outcomes of education, and investigate the cognitive development of children and studies how knowledge is transmitted, acquired, and organized. This discipline overlaps with cognitive psychology and cognitive science because of its interest in learning, covering diverse cognitive processes and skills, such as conceptual change, metacognition, mental models, logical reasoning, and problem solving. Cognitive learning theories conceptualize learning in terms of information processing. They analyze how information is encoded, retrieved, and transformed, often with the goal of devising educational practices that optimize learning. For example, cognitive load theory identifies limitations of working memory as a bottleneck that impedes learning and proposes educational practices to avoid cognitive overload.

Psychometrics examines how mental attributes can be measured. It includes the discussion of cognitive tests, which are methods designed to assess cognitive abilities. IQ tests estimate overall cognitive performance by measuring how individuals perform on tasks involving logical reasoning, verbal comprehension, spatial thinking, and working memory. The Montreal Cognitive Assessment and the mini–mental state examination are tests to detect cognitive impairment, such as deficits in memory, attention, and language.

Cognitive enhancement encompasses diverse ways to improve mental performance, including biochemical, behavioral, and physical factors. Biochemical approaches include balanced nutrition and psychoactive substances like caffeine and amphetamine. Behavioral enhancements cover physical exercise, sufficient sleep, meditation, and cognitive strategies, such as mnemonics. Physical enhancements encompass invasive and non-invasive brain stimulation as well as neurofeedback and wearable devices.

Cognitive behavior therapy is a psychotherapy that analyzes psychological problems in terms of cognitive processes. It argues that maladaptive automatic thoughts, cognitive distortions, and unhealthy core beliefs lead to inaccurate interpretations of events, emotional distress, and problematic behavior. For example, if a person has an unconscious core belief that they are fundamentally inadequate, they may misinterpret a neutral interaction as a rejection. Cognitive behavior therapists seek to restructure problematic attitudes by helping clients modify dysfunctional thought patterns and maladaptive behavior.

Many topics in computer science are relevant to cognition, particularly for approaches that understand cognition in terms of computation and information processing. Theories of computation examine the nature of computation and explore which problems can be solved computationally. Computer architecture has parallels with cognitive architecture, providing models of how different components interact to form a functional system. Another overlap concerns the field of knowledge representation, in which computer scientists explore formal data structures that make knowledge accessible to computational processes. Artificial intelligence is the capacity of certain computer systems to perform tasks requiring intelligence, such as reasoning and problem-solving. It includes the field of machine learning, through which computer systems acquire new abilities not explicitly coded by programmers. The field of cognitive robotics integrates insights from these subfields to create intelligent robots.

== History ==
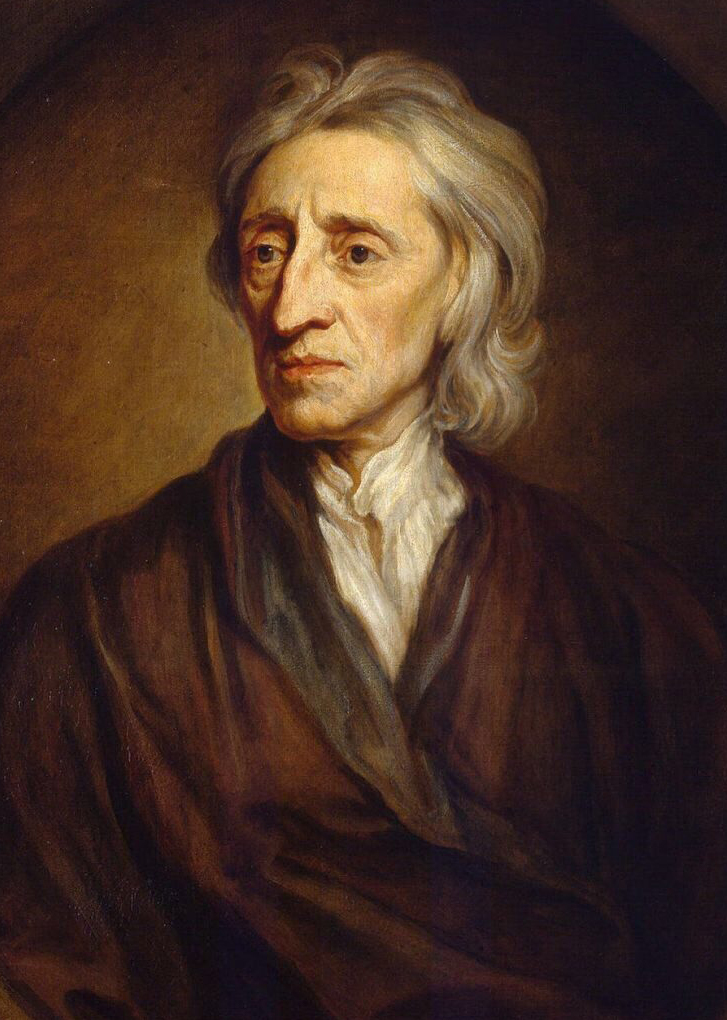
John Locke argued that humans have no inborn knowledge and need to learn everything from experience.

Cognitive research has its roots in ancient philosophy. Early work took the form of reflections on the nature and sources of knowledge, proposed divisions of the mind into separate faculties, and analyzed specific cognitive processes, like perception and deductive reasoning. Plato (c. 428–347 BCE) examined how knowledge of abstract principles is possible. His student Aristotle (384–322 BCE) explored the nature of perception, studying how the mind integrates sensory data with memory and imagination. He also devised a formal logical system to describe logical reasoning. Inspired by Aristotle, Avicenna (980–1037 CE) and Thomas Aquinas (1225–1274 CE) developed faculty psychologies that organized the mind into distinct faculties and analyzed their functions and interactions. In early modern philosophy, rationalists like René Descartes (1596–1650) and Gottfried Wilhelm Leibniz (1646–1716) argued that the mind has innate knowledge of the world. This view was opposed by empiricists, like John Locke (1632–1704), who saw the mind as a blank slate that learns everything from experience. Immanuel Kant (1724–1804) introduced the idea of innate categories that organize all experience and understanding.

Experimental research into cognitive processes began in the late 19th century with Wilhelm Wundt (1832–1920) and his student Edward Bradford Titchener (1867–1927). They laid the foundations of scientific psychology by introducing controlled laboratory experiments, such as measuring responses and reaction times to stimuli, combined with a rigorous introspective method. Hermann Ebbinghaus (1850–1909) and Mary Whiton Calkins (1863–1930) pioneered experimental studies of memory. William James (1842–1910) approached psychological research from a pragmatist perspective, studying everyday experience. In the early 20th century, Max Wertheimer (1880–1943), Kurt Koffka (1886–1941), and Wolfgang Köhler (1887–1967) formulated Gestalt psychology. In contrast to earlier experimental approaches that analyzed individual elements, they focused on larger patterns that emerge as the mind actively organizes information into coherent wholes. Frederic Bartlett (1886–1969) was also interested in how the mind actively transforms information, examining how this process introduces systematic errors into memory.

Difficulties in measuring internal cognitive events led to the rise of behaviorism, which sought to explain observable conduct through stimulus–response patterns without reference to unobservable mental states. Initially developed by John B. Watson (1878–1958), it dominated psychological research in the first half of the 20th century. Challenges in explaining complex human behavior prompted a paradigm shift in the 1950s—the cognitive revolution. Instead of studying stimulus–response patterns, researchers examined how the mind receives, stores, and transforms information, placing cognition at the center of psychological research and resulting in the emergence of cognitive subfields across disciplines.

Jean Piaget (1896–1980) applied these ideas to developmental psychology and proposed a series of cognitive stages through which children pass as they gradually acquire the capacity for abstract thinking. Donald Broadbent (1926–1993) integrated ideas from the information theory of communication, developed by Claude Shannon (1916–2001) and Warren Weaver (1894–1978), to analyze how perception transmits and filters information. Allen Newell (1927–1992) and Herbert A. Simon (1916–2001) helped establish the field of artificial intelligence while demonstrating how computers can model and simulate human problem-solving. In linguistics, Noam Chomsky (b. 1928) examined how the brain processes language, identifying universal patterns of language mechanisms.

These developments across several fields of inquiry led to the formation of cognitive science in the 1970s. David Marr (1945–1980) helped unify this interdisciplinary field with the tri-level hypothesis, proposing that the distinct disciplines work on different levels of abstraction but are fundamentally concerned with the same phenomena. The advent of neuroimaging techniques such as fMRI and PET revolutionized the neuroscientific study of cognition, enabling the examination of regional, task-specific brain activity. Concurrently, advances in computational power and artificial intelligence made possible the design of increasingly complex simulations of cognition and intelligent systems that rival and surpass human cognition in specific tasks.

== See also ==
- Cognitive computing – Concept of "brainlike" computing
- Cognitive musicology – Branch of cognitive science
- Cognitivism – Theoretical framework for understanding the mind
- Outline of human intelligence
- Outline of thought – Overview of and topical guide to thought
- Sex differences in cognition
