= Automatic and controlled processes =

Categories of cognitive processing

Automatic and controlled processes (ACP) are the two categories of cognitive processing. All cognitive processes are theorized to fall into one or both of those categories. The level of attention and effort (cognitive demand) required by a cognitive process is the main differentiating factor between automatic and controlled processes. Automatic processes refer to cognitive processes that occur with little or no attention, low effort/control (low cognitive demand), and can occur in parallel with other cognitive processes. Contrarily, controlled processes refer to cognitive processes that occur with attention, effortful control (high cognitive demand), and occur serially. Controlled processes are typically slower than automatic processes, and are limited by the availability of cognitive resources.

== Characteristics ==
=== Automatic processes ===
When examining the label "automatic" in social psychology, we find that some processes are intended, and others require recent conscious and intentional processing of related information. Automatic processes are more complicated than people may think. Some examples of automatic processes include motor skills, implicit biases, procedural tasks, and priming. The tasks that are listed can be done without the need for conscious attention.

That being said automatic effects fall into three classes: Those that occur prior to conscious awareness (preconscious); those that require some form of conscious processing but that produce an unintended outcome (postconscious); and those that require a specific type of intentional, goal directed processing (goal-dependent).

Preconscious automaticity requires only the triggering proximal stimulus event, and occur prior to or in the absence of any conscious awareness of that event. Because they occur without our conscious awareness they are unnoticeable, uncontrollable, and nearly effortless.

Postconscious automaticity depends on recent conscious experience for its occurrence. This postconscious influence on processing can be defined as the non-conscious consequences of conscious thought. The conscious experience may be intentional, or it may be unintentional, what is important is that the material be in awareness. Most things we are aware of are driven by the environment, and one does not intend or control the flood of these perceptual experiences, yet they still result in postconscious effects. In other words, we need to consciously engage in something and depending on the experience we will unconsciously think, and or behave a certain way. In the classic Bobo doll experiment a child watches a video of an adult acting aggressive towards a Bobo doll. Later when the child is put in the room with that same doll, the child was more likely to also engage in that act, versus children who didn't watch the video. In a study participants were primed with the stereotype of professors by being told to imagine a typical professor for 5 min and to list (a conscious act) the behaviors, lifestyle, and appearance attributes of this typical professor. After they were primed they had to perform a general knowledge task. The results were that the participants in the professor condition outperformed those in the control conditions (those not primed at all).

Goal-dependent automaticity concerns skill and thought processes that require a goal to engage in them. This process is much similar to postconscious in that it requires conscious awareness to be initiated, but after that it can be guided outside of awareness by the unconscious mind. A good example would be driving a car: in order to drive a car, one needs to consciously have a goal to drive somewhere. When engaged in driving (only with enough practice) one can operate the car almost entirely without conscious awareness. However, more attentional control and decision making are needed when introduced to novel (reference) situations like driving through an unfamiliar town. The process needs to be learned enough that it can be automatic, requiring little conscious thought as to how to do it.

=== Controlled processes ===
One definition of a controlled process is an intentionally-initiated sequence of cognitive activities. In other words, when attention is required for a task, we are consciously aware and in control. Controlled processes require us to think about situations, evaluate and make decisions. An example would be reading this article. We are required to read and understand the concepts of these processes and it takes effort to think conceptually. Controlled processes are thought to be slower, since by definition they require effortful control; therefore, they generally cannot be conducted simultaneously with other controlled processes without task-switching or impaired performance. So the drawback of controlled processes is that humans are thought to have a limited capacity for overtly controlling behavior. Being tightly capacity-limited, controlled processing imposes considerable limitations on speed and the ability to have divided attention. Divided attention is the ability to switch between tasks. Some tasks are easier to perform with other tasks like talking and driving. Holding a conversation, however, becomes more difficult when traffic increases because of the need to focus more on driving than on talking.

Forster and Lavie found that the ability to focus on a task is influenced by processing capacity and perceptual load. Processing capacity is the amount of incoming information a person can process or handle at one time. Perceptual load is how difficult the task is. A low load task is when one can think less about the task they are involved in. A high load task is when one needs to devote all their focus to the task. If they become distracted then they won't be able to accomplish the task.

In a study, participants were randomly assigned into two conditions, one requiring one task (small cognitive load) and one requiring two tasks (heavy cognitive load). In the one-task condition, participants were told that they would hear an anti- or pro-abortion speech and would have to diagnose the speaker's attitude toward abortion. The two-task condition had the same first assignment, but they were required to switch spots with the speaker and take their place after that. Even after being specifically told that they would be given further instructions at the next step, their cognitive load was affected in this study. Participants in the two-task condition performed more poorly than the one-task condition simply because they had the next task on their mind (they had extra cognitive load). Basically, the more tasks someone tries to manage at the same time, the more their performance will suffer.

=== Processes with ambiguous categorization ===
Some actions utilize a combination of automatic and controlled processes. One example is brushing your teeth. At any point, you could think about each tooth as you individually scrub them, but for the most part, the action is automatic. Another example is playing a musical instrument. After learning where your fingers should be placed and how to play certain notes you no longer have to think about what your fingers are doing. Your controlled process are then engaged in thinking about dynamics and intonation. Some processes can even start as controlled and become more automatic. Some cognitive processes are difficult to categorize as distinctly automatic or controlled, either because they contain components of both types of process or because the phenomena are difficult to define or observe. An example of the former is driving a car. An example of the latter is flow. Process of breathing, automatic and controlled, easily observed.

=== Flow ===
Flow has been described as involving highly focused attention on the task at hand, loss of self-consciousness, and distorted time perception, among other cognitive characteristics. Some people report that during flow states they are less aware of autonomic responses such as hunger, fatigue, and discomfort. Some researchers hypothesize that because of this, some challenging tasks can counterintuitively require less effort to perform.

Flow has been difficult to study, however, because it is difficult to produce in a controlled laboratory setting. Most experiments have relied heavily on correlating the presence of flow with various attributes of the task and the subjects' reported experiences. Of those correlations, subjects experiencing flow generally report that they perceive a good match between the task requirements and their skills (e.g. a professional basketball player in a professional basketball game.) Task structure and the clarity of the goal of the task are also thought to be related to when flow occurs. All of these aspects of flow imply that there must be an opportunity to suppress other controlled processes, as well as inhibit certain types of automatic processes.

A study involving video game performance showed that flow in participants (determined based on a self-report survey of flow characteristics) strongly correlated with performance in the game. A related study attempted to inhibit and induce flow by biasing the moods of participants. The experimenters found that flow could be inhibited by a negative mood, but could not be induced by a positive mood.

"A person does not need to be told to pay attention to a stimulus that captures attention quickly and effortlessly." In many cases, explicitly directing one's own or another's attention is necessary due to the presence of another stimulus that more easily captures attention. In the case of flow, however, an action that would normally grab one's attention is ignored, and many automatic processes are either suppressed (such as stimulus-driven attention changes) or ignored (such as discomfort.)

On the other hand, situations in which autonomy is encroached upon (for example, if the individual must always control his/her actions to abide by rules imposed by the task) are thought to inhibit flow. This implies that another requirement of flow is to be free from constraints that force controlled processes to be used. Additionally, several areas of research indicate that during a state of flow an otherwise-controlled process becomes automatic allowing it to behave dominant over all other automatic processes.

=== Dual Process Theories ===
Dual process theories are a class of theories that are used to explain many cognitive processes, including judgement and decision-making. Dual process theories assume that humans possess two types of cognitive processing that map onto automatic and controlled processing: Type 1 and Type 2 (Also known as System 1 and System 2, respectively). Type 1 relies automatic processing, does not require working memory, and is typically the faster of the two processing types. Type 2 relies on controlled processing, requiring controlled attention and working memory. The automatic/controlled distinction between Type 1 and Type 2 is only one of many common distinctions. Some others include: unconscious/conscious, associative/rule-based, and intuitive/deliberate. Besides the automatic/controlled distinction, criticism exists for common distinctions between Type 1 and Type 2 processes, arising from inconsistent findings or disagreements among researchers. For instance, the unconscious/conscious is commonly criticized for its lack of conceptual clarity, making it vague and an unreliable identifier of Type 1 and Type 2 processing.

== See also ==
- Conscious mind
- Dual process theory
- Modularity of mind
