= Extended mind thesis =

Philosophy of mind where the mind resides beyond the brain and body

In philosophy of mind, the extended mind thesis (EMT) says that the mind does not exclusively reside in the brain or even the body but extends into the physical world. The thesis proposes that some objects in the external environment can be part of a cognitive process and in that way function as extensions of the mind itself. Examples of such objects are written calculations, a diary, or a personal computer; in general, it concerns objects that store information. The hypothesis considers the mind to encompass every level of cognition, including the physical level.

It was proposed by Andy Clark and David Chalmers in their 1998 paper "The Extended Mind". They describe the idea as "active externalism, based on the active role of the environment in driving cognitive processes."

For the matter of personal identity (and the philosophy of self), the EMT has the implication that some parts of a person's identity can be determined by their environment.

== "The Extended Mind" ==
"The Extended Mind" by Andy Clark and David Chalmers (1998) is the paper that originally stated the EMT. Clark and Chalmers present the idea of active externalism (not to be confused with semantic externalism), in which objects within the environment function as a part of the mind. They argue that the separation between the mind, the body, and the environment is an unprincipled distinction. Because external objects play a significant role in aiding cognitive processes, the mind and the environment act as a "coupled system" that can be seen as a complete cognitive system of its own. In this manner, the mind is extended into the physical world. The main criterion that Clark and Chalmers list for classifying the use of external objects during cognitive tasks as a part of an extended cognitive system is that the external objects must function with the same purpose as the internal processes.

Clark and Chalmers present a thought experiment to illustrate the environment's role in connection to the mind. The fictional characters Otto and Inga are both travelling to a museum simultaneously. Otto has Alzheimer's disease, and has written all of his directions down in a notebook to serve the function of his memory. Inga is able to recall the internal directions within her memory. The argument is that the only difference existing in these two cases is that Inga's memory is being internally processed by the brain, while Otto's memory is being served by the notebook. In other words, Otto's mind has been extended to include the notebook as the source of his memory. The notebook qualifies as such because it is constantly and immediately accessible to Otto, and it is automatically endorsed by him. They also suggest Otto's notebook should be considered an extension of himself; the notebook in a way becomes a "fragile biological limb or organ" that Otto wants to protect from harm.

The thought experiment has been criticised with the notion that what happens with Otto is not very similar to what happens with Inga. This criticism is addressed by Clark in Supersizing the Mind:

[The] claim was not that the processes in Otto and Inga are identical, or even similar, in terms of their detailed implementation. It is simply that, with respect to the role that the long-term encodings play in guiding current response, both modes of storage can be seen as supporting dispositional beliefs. It is the way the information is poised to guide reasoning ... and behavior that counts.

== Research ==
The shared intentionality hypothesis yields yet another perspective to the idea of extended mind. Based on evidence in neuroscience (Note: See the following) and psychophysiological research, (Note: For example:) Latvian Researcher Igor Val Danilov proposed that implicit interpersonal dynamics in groups leads to improved individual performance. Later in 2024, he argued that an embryo's nervous system (being a part of the external environment to the mother's nervous system) can take part in the mother's cognitive process and function as an extension of the mother's mind. This neuronal coupling provides social learning during the embryonal period. Indeed, numerous studies on fetal responses to external stimuli have revealed signs of fetal cognition; the movements of the fetuses seem intentional. In 2012, MRI neuroscience research showed evidence of fetal cognition through categorization at 33 weeks of gestation, registering responses in the fetal brain to language and voice stimuli. Specifically, neuronal activity increased in the left temporal lobe of the fetal brain in response to an unfamiliar female voice compared with pure tones. Then, a maternal voice elicited significantly more neuronal activity in the lower bank of the temporal lobe than an unfamiliar female voice. According to Latvian researcher Igor Val Danilov, a mother–fetus neurocognitive model provides insights into the emergence of object perception in naive organisms. Beginning at the cellular level, it explains neurophysiological processes during fetal neuronal development. In short, we know that the fetal environment is a cacophony of stimuli: electromagnetic waves, chemical interactions, and pressure fluctuations. The binding problem stands that the relevant stimulus cannot overcome the noise threshold when it passes through the senses. While the fetal nervous system needs to integrate stimuli to combine objects, background, and abstract or emotional features into a single experience for building a representation of the surrounding reality, it cannot distinguish relevant sensory stimuli independently to integrate them into object representations. Therefore, the fetal perception is limited. The mother-fetus neurocognitive model explains how electromagnetic and acoustic oscillations of the mother's heart shape an ensemble of neuronal activity across both nervous systems. During the mother's intentional act with her environment, specifically the acoustic environment shared with the fetus in the low-frequency sound band, the brainwave entrainment provides clues to the fetus's nervous system, linking neuronal activity with relevant stimuli. From this perspective, the Mother-fetus neurocognitive model and Shared intentionality approach provide empirical evidence of the extended mind thesis.

== Criticism ==
Philosophical arguments against the extended mind thesis include the following.

1. When focusing on cognition, the thesis confuses claims about what is constitutive about the concept of cognition with claims about causal influences on cognition (the "causal-constitutional fallacy"). For example, Adams and Aizawa (2010) write, "Question: Why did the pencil think that 2 + 2 = 4?, Clark’s Answer: Because it was coupled to the mathematician."
2. It stretches the limits of our ordinary concept of cognition too far ("cognitive bloating"), potentially implying that everything on the Internet is part of individual cognitive systems.
3. It uses coarse-grained functionalism about the mind that ignores plausible differences between internal and external processes, such as differences between beliefs and external props and devices; or for creating a notion of cognition too heterogeneous to make up a scientific natural kind.

Each of these arguments is addressed in Clark (2008), in which he notes:

1. While coupling is important for cognition, that is not to say that it is sufficient – coupling must play a functional role in cognition. Many couplings do not do so and thus would not be 'extensions' (and this is consistent with a strong extended mind thesis).
2. Any putative part of a system – internal or external – is unlikely to yield "cognition" on its own. Thus, examples such as calculators, and pencils, should be considered in parallel with neural regions. Simply looking at the part is not enough for cognition.
3. One can imagine circumstances under which a biological being might retain information in non-neural ways (a hypothetical Martian with a bitmap-based memory, or humans with prosthetics to support memory). Thus, being neural cannot be a necessary condition for being cognitive.

While in Supersizing the Mind Clark defends a strong version of the hypothesis of extended cognition (contrasted with a hypothesis of embedded cognition) in other work, some of these objections have inspired more moderate reformulations of the extended mind thesis. Thus, the extended mind thesis may no longer depend on the parity considerations of Clark and Chalmers' original argument but, instead, emphasize the "complementarity" of internal and external elements of cognitive systems or processes. This version might be understood as emphasizing the explanatory value of the extended mind thesis for cognitive science rather than maintaining it as an ontological claim about the nature of mind or cognition.

Vincent C. Müller argues that the extended mind "sounds like a substantive thesis, the truth of which we should investigate. But actually the thesis turns about to be just a statement on where the demarcations for the 'mental' are to be set" and that "this discussion about demarcation is merely verbal and thus to be avoided".

== Relation to embodied and enacted cognition ==
As described by Mark Rowlands, mental processes are:

- Embodied involves more than the brain, including a more general involvement of bodily structures and processes.
- Embedded functioning only in a related external environment.
- Enacted involving not only neural processes but also things an organism does.
- Extended into the organism's environment.

This 4E cognition contrasts with the view of the mind as a processing center that creates mental representations of reality and uses them to control the body's behaviour. The field of extended cognition focuses upon the processes involved in this creation and subsumes these processes as part of consciousness, which is no longer confined to the brain or body but involves interaction with the environment. At a 'low' level, like motor learning and haptic perception, the body is involved in cognition, but there is a 'high' level where cultural factors play a role. This view of cognition is sometimes referred to as enaction to emphasise the role of interplay between the organism and its environment and the feedback processes involved in developing an awareness of, and a reformation of, the environment. For example, Japyassú and Laland argue that some spider's web is something between part of its sensory system and an additional part of its cognitive system.

== See also ==
- Cognitive model
- Distributed cognition
- Embodied cognition
- Enactivism
- Extelligence
- The Extended Phenotype
- Landauer's principle
- Language
- Situated cognition
