= Daniel Hutto =

American philosopher

- Born: Daniel Douglas Hutto; 1965 (age 60–61)

Education
- Education: Marist College; University of St Andrews; University of York

Philosophical work
- Era: Contemporary philosophy
- Region: Western philosophy
- School: Analytic
- Institutions: University of Hertfordshire; University of Wollongong
- Main interests: Enactivism; Affect; Folk psychology

Daniel Douglas Hutto (born 1965) is an American philosopher and professor of philosophical psychology jointly at the University of Wollongong and University of Hertfordshire.

He is known for his research on enactivism, affect, folk psychology and Ludwig Wittgenstein's philosophy. He is also known for designing and heading the Bachelor of Arts in Western Civilisation degree at the University of Wollongong. This degree has led to controversy due to being funded by the Ramsay Centre, of which former Australian prime ministers Tony Abbott and John Howard are board members, however John Howard has since stepped down from his position.

== Bibliography ==
- Radicalizing Enactivism: Basic Minds without Content (with Myin, E.). Cambridge, MA: The MIT Press, Bradford Books. (2013)
- Folk Psychological Narratives: The Socio-Cultural Basis of Understanding Reasons. Cambridge, MA: The MIT Press, Bradford Books. (2008, paperback edition 2013)
- Wittgenstein and the End of Philosophy: Neither Theory Nor Therapy. Basingstoke: Palgrave. (2006, 2003). 1st edition (2003). Second, revised edition (2006) contains an additional chapter with replies to papers by Rupert Read (2004, 2006) and Phil Hutchinson and Rupert Read (2006)
- Daniel D. Hutto & Matthew Ratcliffe (eds.), Folk Psychology Re-Assessed; Dorndrecht, the Netherlands: Springer, 2007; ISBN 978-1-4020-5557-7

== See also ==
- Space Infantry
