= Mark Rowlands =

Welsh writer and philosopher (born 1962)

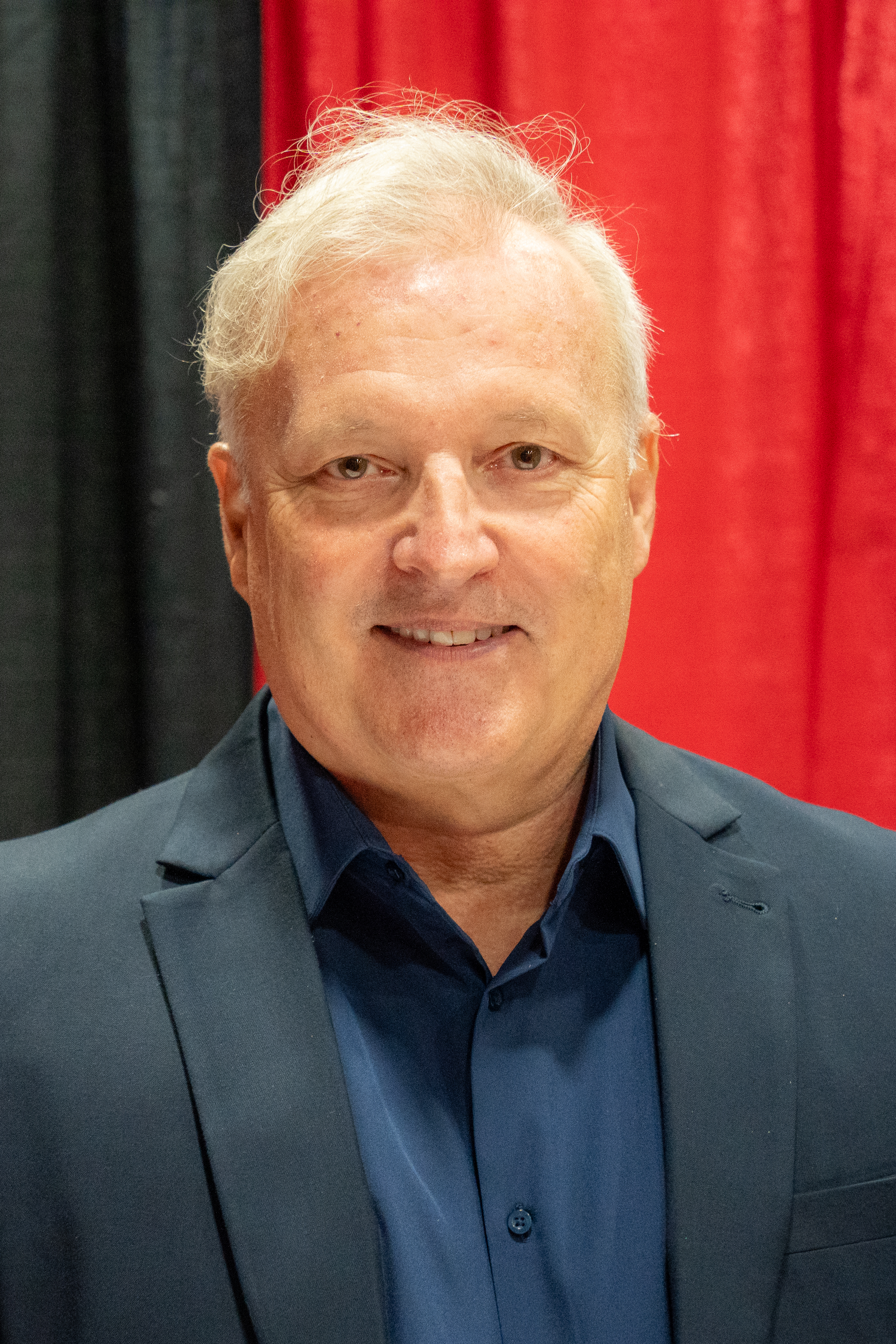
- Rowlands at the National Book Festival 2025
- Born: 1962 (age 63–64); Newport, Wales
- Education: BA (philosophy); University of Manchester; DPhil (philosophy); University of Oxford
- Known for: The Philosopher and the Wolf (2008), Running with the Pack (2013), Everything I learned from TV
- Scientific career
- Fields: Philosophy of mind, Moral philosophy
- Workplaces: University of Miami
- Thesis: Anomalism, supervenience, and explanation in cognitive psychology (1989)

Mark Rowlands (born 1962) is a Welsh writer and philosopher. He is a Professor of Philosophy at the University of Miami and the author of several books on the philosophy of mind, the moral status of non-human animals, and cultural criticism. He is known within academic philosophy for his work on the animal mind and is one of the principal architects of the view known as vehicle externalism, or the extended mind, the view that thoughts, memories, desires, and beliefs can be stored outside the brain and the skull. His works include Animal Rights (1998), The Body in Mind (1999), The Nature of Consciousness (2001), Animals Like Us (2002), and a personal memoir, The Philosopher and the Wolf (2008).

== Biography ==
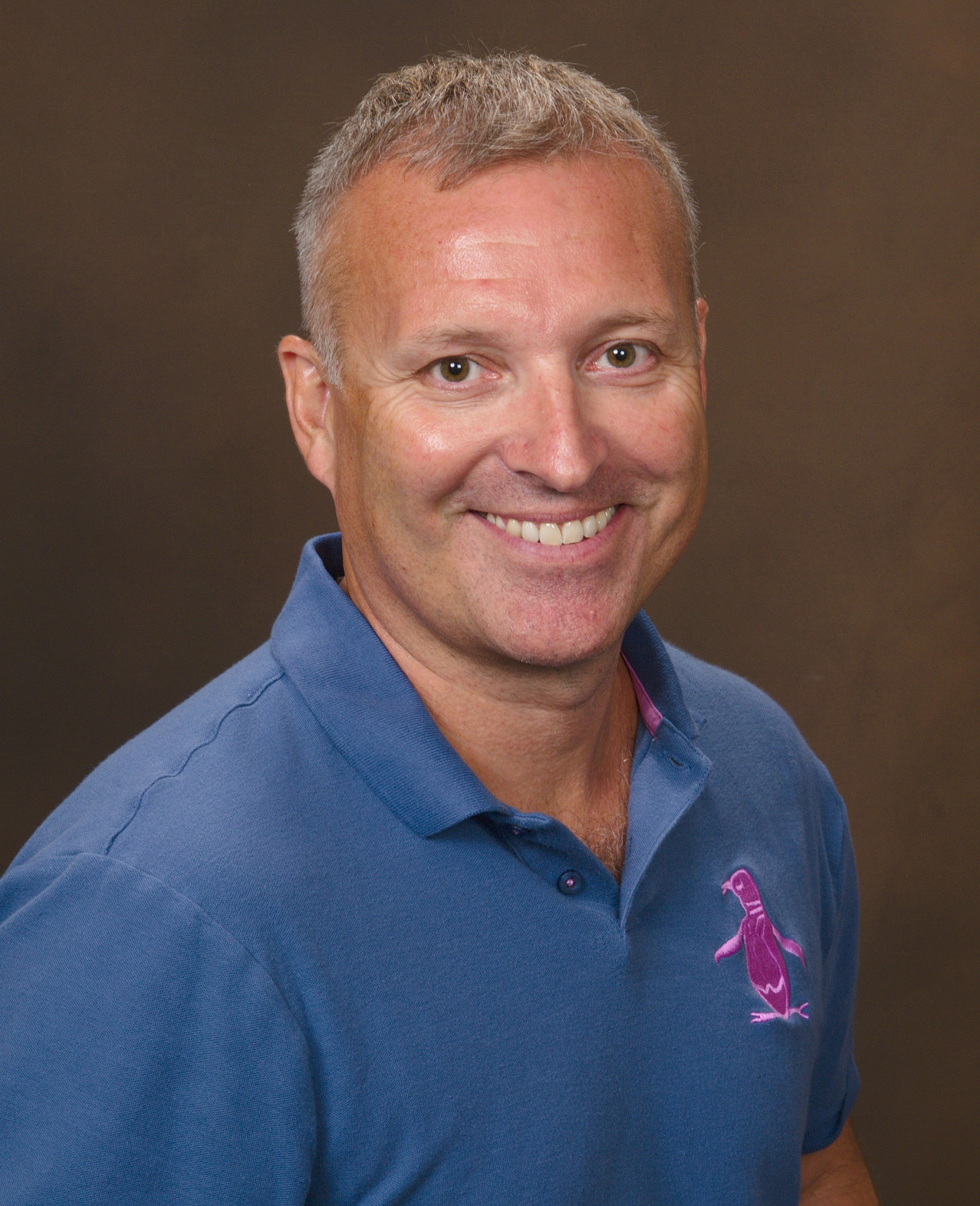
Rowlands in 2012

Rowlands was born in Newport, Wales and began his undergraduate degree in engineering at the University of Manchester before changing to philosophy. He took his doctorate in philosophy from the University of Oxford, and has held various academic positions in philosophy in Britain, Ireland and the United States.

His best known work is his international best-selling memoir, The Philosopher and the Wolf, about the decade he spent living and travelling with a wolf. As Jonathan Derbyshire wrote in his Guardian review, "it is perhaps best described as the autobiography of an idea, or rather a set of related ideas, about the relationship between human and non-human animals." Julian Baggini wrote in the Financial Times that it was "a remarkable portrait of the bond that can exist between a human being and a beast." Mark Vernon writing in The Times Literary Supplement added that it "could become a philosophical cult classic."

== Bibliography ==
- Supervenience and Materialism, Ashgate, 1995.
- Animal Rights: A Philosophical Defence, Macmillan/St Martin's Press, 1998. ISBN 978-0-333-71131-6
- The Body in Mind: Understanding Cognitive Processes, Cambridge University Press, 1999. ISBN 978-0-521-04979-5
- The Environmental Crisis: Understanding the Value of Nature, Macmillan/St Martin's Press, 2000.
- The Nature of Consciousness, Cambridge University Press, 2001. ISBN 978-0-521-03947-5
- Animals Like Us, Verso, 2002. ISBN 978-1-85984-386-4
- Externalism: Putting Mind and World Back Together Again, Acumen/McGill-Queen's University Press, 2003. ISBN 978-1-902683-78-2
- The Philosopher at the End of the Universe, Ebury/Random House, 2003 ISBN 978-0-09-190388-6; retitled Sci-Phi: Philosophy from Socrates to Schwarzenegger, 2nd edition ISBN 978-0-312-32236-6
- Everything I Know I Learned From TV: Philosophy for the Unrepentant Couch Potato, Ebury/Random House, 2005 ISBN 978-0-09-189835-9
- Body Language: Representing in Action, MIT Press, 2006.
- Fame, Acumen 2008. ISBN 978-1-84465-157-3
- The Philosopher and the Wolf, Granta, 2008. ISBN 978-1-84708-059-2
- The New Science of the Mind, MIT Press, 2010. ISBN 978-0-262-01455-7
- Can Animals be Moral? Oxford University Press, 2012 ISBN 978-0-19-984200-1
- Running with the Pack, Granta, 2013 ISBN 978-1847082022
- The Word of Dog, Liveright Publishing Corp. ISBN 9781324095682
- The Happiness of Dogs, Granta, 2024 ISBN 978-1-80351-033-0

== See also ==
- List of animal rights advocates
