= Andy Clark (philosopher) =

British philosopher (born 1957)

- Born: 1957 (age 68–69)

Education
- Education: University of Stirling

Philosophical work
- Era: 21st-century philosophy
- Region: Western philosophy
- School: Analytic philosophy
- Institutions: University of Sussex; University of Edinburgh; Indiana University Bloomington; Washington University in St. Louis
- Main interests: Philosophy of mind
- Notable ideas: Extended mind

Andy Clark (born 1957) is a British philosopher. He is professor of cognitive philosophy at the University of Sussex. Prior to this, he was a professor of philosophy and chair in logic and metaphysics at the University of Edinburgh, director of the cognitive science program at Indiana University Bloomington, and rhetorical director of the philosophy-psychology-neuroscience program at Washington University in St. Louis.

Clark is one of the founding members of the CONTACT collaborative research project, whose aim is to investigate the role environment plays in shaping the nature of conscious experience. Clark's papers and books deal with the philosophy of mind and he is considered a leading scholar on the subject of mind extension. He has also written extensively on connectionism, robotics and the role and nature of mental representation.

== Philosophical work ==
Clark has proposed a two-way "cascade of cortical processing" underlying perception, action, and learning. He posits a model where 'error units' are generated by comparing the expected outcome of a given process with the actual outcome, and these are used to refine the prediction of outcome in the future, creating a feedback loop between prediction and error. He posits that interactions between the 'forward' flow of error and 'backward' flow of prediction are dynamic, with factors such as attention, dopamine production, changes in environment, and one's individual personality affecting this two-way system.

Clark's writings also focus on the concept of transhumanism, such as in his work Natural-Born Cyborgs, which explores the fusion of human biology and technological implants through a series of contemporary technological studies and an evaluation of the cyborg figure in pop-culture.

=== Extended mind thesis ===
Clark has also worked on the extended mind thesis, which says that the mind extends into the environment. Clark spoke about this thesis in TEDxLambeth 2019.

== Personal life ==
Clark lives in Brighton, England, with his partner, Alexa Morcom, a cognitive neuroscientist.

== Bibliography ==
Books by Andy Clark:

- Microcognition: Philosophy, Cognitive Science and Parallel Distributed Processing (1989)
- Associative Engines: Connectionism, Concepts and Representational Change (1993)
- Being There: Putting Brain, Body and World Together Again (1997)
- Mindware: An Introduction to the Philosophy of Cognitive Science (2001)
- Natural-Born Cyborgs: Minds, Technologies, and the Future of Human Intelligence (2004)
- Supersizing the Mind: Embodiment, Action, and Cognitive Extension (2008)
- Surfing Uncertainty: Prediction, Action, and the Embodied Mind (2016)
- The Experience Machine: How Our Minds Predict and Shape Reality (2023)

Clark is also on the editorial boards of the following journals:

- Behavioral and Brain Sciences
- Cognitive Science
- Cognitive Science Quarterly
- Connection Science
- Minds and Machines
- Philosophy and Society
- Pragmatics and Cognition
