= List of cognitive scientists =

Below are some notable researchers in cognitive science.

== Computer science ==
- Michael A. Arbib
- Randall Beer
- Guy André Boy
- Rodney Brooks
- Jaime Carbonell
- Gail Carpenter
- Cristiano Castelfranchi
- Laurence Devillers
- Michael Georgeff
- Ian Goodfellow
- Barbara J. Grosz
- Demis Hassabis
- Catherine Havasi
- Geoffrey Hinton
- Douglas Hofstadter
- Vasant Honavar
- John Hopfield
- Michael I. Jordan
- Andrej Karpathy
- David Kirsh
- Daphne Koller
- Janet Kolodner
- Yann LeCun
- Douglas Lenat
- Antonio Lieto
- Fei-Fei Li
- Seppo Linnainmaa
- Marvin Minsky
- Tom M. Mitchell
- Allen Newell
- Andrew Ng
- Seymour Papert
- Paolo Petta
- Gordon Plotkin
- Ruslan Salakhutdinov
- Arthur Samuel
- Roger Schank
- Anil Seth
- Aaron Sloman
- Ehud Shapiro
- Herbert A. Simon
- Alan Turing
- Massimiliano Versace
- Terry Winograd
- Patrick Winston
- Richard Zemel

== Linguistics ==
- Elizabeth Bates
- Paolo Canettieri
- Anne Castles
- Noam Chomsky
- Jeffrey Elman
- Daniel L. Everett
- Gilles Fauconnier
- Charles Fillmore
- Janet Dean Fodor
- Jean Gagnepain
- Peter Gärdenfors
- Dirk Geeraerts
- Susan Gelman
- LouAnn Gerken
- Raymond W. Gibbs Jr.
- Anne-Lise Giraud
- Lila R. Gleitman
- Adele Goldberg
- Louis M. Goldstein
- Joseph Grady
- Nina Hyams
- Ray Jackendoff
- Pauline Jacobson
- Mark Johnson
- George Lakoff
- Barbara Landau
- Ronald Langacker
- Géraldine Legendre
- Eric Lenneberg
- Elena Lieven
- Brian MacWhinney
- Ellen Markman
- Steven Pinker
- David Poeppel
- Leonard Talmy
- Mark Turner
- Lydia White
- Deirdre Wilson
- Charles Yang

== Neuroscience ==
- Larry Abbott
- Eugene Aserinsky
- Timothy Bliss
- Jean-Pierre Changeux
- Francis Crick
- Antonio Damasio
- Peter Dayan
- Jean Decety
- Stanislas Dehaene
- William C. Dement
- John Eccles
- Gerald Edelman
- Howard Eichenbaum
- Martha Farah
- Vittorio Gallese
- Michael Gazzaniga
- Norman Geschwind
- Stephen Grossberg
- Donald O. Hebb
- Allan Hobson
- Myron Arms Hofer
- Jon Kaas
- Eric Kandel
- Nathaniel Kleitman
- Christof Koch
- Stephen Kosslyn
- Jerome Lettvin
- Rodolfo Llinás
- Terje Lømo
- David Marr
- Earl K. Miller
- Richard G. Morris
- Edvard Moser
- May-Britt Moser
- Vernon Benjamin Mountcastle
- Lynn Nadel
- Charles A. Nelson III
- Helen Neville
- John O'Keefe
- Elizabeth A. Phelps
- Karl Pribram
- Dale Purves
- Marcus Raichle
- Vilayanur Ramachandran
- Gina Rippon
- Giacomo Rizzolatti
- Trevor Robbins
- Todd Rose
- Olaf Sporns
- Giulio Tononi
- Rafael Yuste
- Charles H. Zeanah
- Semir Zeki

== Philosophy ==
- Leo Apostel
- István Aranyosi
- Daniel A. Arnold
- Ned Block
- Franz Brentano
- Tyler Burge
- Donald T. Campbell
- Peter Carruthers
- David Chalmers
- Patricia Churchland
- Paul Churchland
- Andy Clark
- Tim Crane
- Gregory Currie
- Daniel Dennett
- Ezequiel Di Paolo
- Hubert Dreyfus
- Fred Dretske
- Jerry Fodor
- Shaun Gallagher
- Tamar Gendler
- Peter Godfrey-Smith
- Alvin Goldman
- Rom Harré
- John Haugeland
- John Hawthorne
- Martin Heidegger
- David Hume
- Edmund Husserl
- Daniel Hutto
- Mark Johnson
- Joshua Knobe
- Saul Kripke
- Colin McGinn
- Edouard Machery
- Fiona Macpherson
- Maurice Merleau-Ponty
- Thomas Metzinger
- Thomas Nagel
- Alva Noë
- Jean Piaget
- Gualtiero Piccinini
- Karl Popper
- Jesse Prinz
- Ian Ravenscroft
- Antti Revonsuo
- Tom Rockmore
- Mark Rowlands
- John Searle
- Lawrence Shapiro
- Kim Sterelny
- Stephen Stich
- Galen Strawson
- Paul Thagard
- Evan Thompson
- Michael Tye
- Tim van Gelder
- Heinz von Foerster
- Ernst von Glasersfeld
- Michael Wheeler
- Margaret Dauler Wilson
- Robert Wilson
- Dan Zahavi

== Psychology ==
- Edith Ackermann
- John Robert Anderson
- David Ausubel
- Alan Baddeley
- Paul Baltes
- Simon Baron-Cohen
- Lawrence Barsalou
- Frederic Bartlett
- Aaron T. Beck
- Nikolai Aleksandrovich Bernstein
- Jerome Bruner
- David Buss
- Susan Carey
- Michael Cole
- Allan M. Collins
- Fergus I. M. Craik
- Kenneth Craik
- James E. Cutting
- Andreas Demetriou
- Merlin Donald
- Hermann Ebbinghaus
- Albert Ellis
- Leon Festinger
- Reuven Feuerstein
- Kurt W. Fischer
- John H. Flavell
- Diana Fleischman
- Uta Frith
- Eugene Galanter
- Howard Gardner
- Rochel Gelman
- Dedre Gentner
- Alison Gopnik
- Vittorio Guidano
- Francesca Happé
- Keith Holyoak
- Philip Johnson-Laird
- Daniel Kahneman
- Annette Karmiloff-Smith
- Scott Barry Kaufman
- George Kelly
- Kurt Koffka
- Wolfgang Köhler
- Stephen Kosslyn
- Robert L. Leahy
- Alan M. Leslie
- Elizabeth Loftus
- George Mandler
- James McClelland
- Kathleen McDermott
- Jacques Mehler
- Andrew Meltzoff
- David E. Meyer
- Geoffrey Miller
- George A. Miller
- Naomi Miyake
- Ken Nakayama
- Ulric Neisser
- Robert A. Neimeyer
- Allan Paivio
- Elizabeth A. Phelps
- Jean Piaget
- Steven Pinker
- Michael Posner
- Patricia Resick
- Frank Ritter
- Henry L. Roediger III
- Eleanor Rosch
- David Rumelhart
- Daniel Schacter
- Erwin Segal
- Otto Selz
- Roger Shepard
- Richard Shiffrin
- Linda B. Smith
- Maggie Snowling
- Elizabeth Spelke
- George Sperling
- Robert Sternberg
- Saul Sternberg
- Esther Thelen
- Edward C. Tolman
- Michael Tomasello
- Anne Treisman
- Endel Tulving
- Jaan Valsiner
- Lev Vygotsky
- Adrian Wells
- Max Wertheimer
- David Wechsler
- Jeffrey E. Young
- Pyotr Zinchenko
- Todd Rose

== Other categories ==
- Alfredo Ardila (neuroscience, neuropsychology, anthropology, evolution of cognition)
- Scott Atran (cognitive anthropology)
- Joscha Bach (cognitive science)
- Frederic Bartlett (psychology, social anthropology)
- Justin L. Barrett (cognitive psychology, cognitive anthropology)
- Marc Bekoff (biology, cognitive ethology, behavioral ecology)
- Maurice Bloch (cognitive anthropology)
- Maggie Boden (cognitive science)
- Pascal Boyer (cognitive anthropology)
- Per Aage Brandt (cognitive semiotics)
- Brian Butterworth (speech, dyslexia, mathematics)
- Michael Cole (comparative cognition, cognitive psychology, cultural psychology)
- Frederick L. Coolidge (evolutionary cognitive archaeology, cognitive evolution, behavior genetics)
- Roy D'Andrade (cognitive anthropology)
- Terrence Deacon (neuroanthropology, linguistics)
- Merlin Donald (psychology, anthropology, historical evolution of cognition)
- Fernando Flores (computer science, philosophy)
- John Gowlett (evolutionary cognitive archaeology, evolutionary anthropology)
- Tom Griffiths (computer science, psychology)
- Christopher Robert Hallpike (anthropology)
- Yuval Noah Harari (cognitive evolution, philosophy of artificial intelligence)
- Brian Hare (evolutionary anthropology, evolution of cognition)
- Friedrich Hayek (cognitive psychology, philosophy of perception)
- Cecilia Heyes (cognitive evolution)
- Ludwig Huber (cognitive evolution, cognitive biology)
- Thomas Huffman (ideational cognitive archaeology)
- Edwin Hutchins (cognitive anthropology)
- Paul Jorion (anthropology, sociology)
- Jean Lave (situated cognition, social anthropology)
- Stephen C. Levinson (linguistics, anthropology, psychology)
- David Lewis-Williams (ideational cognitive archaeology)
- Aleksandr Luria (psychology, neuroscience, anthropology)
- Lambros Malafouris (evolutionary cognitive archaeology, philosophy of mind)
- Humberto Maturana (neuroscience, biology of cognition, philosophy)
- Douglas Medin (cognitive psychology, anthropology)
- Steven Mithen (ideational cognitive archaeology)
- Rafael E. Núñez (philosophy of mathematics, linguistics, anthropology)
- Karenleigh A. Overmann (evolutionary cognitive archaeology, cognitive evolution, ethnomathematics, numeracy, literacy)
- Zenon Pylyshyn (engineering, psychology, philosophy)
- Naomi Quinn (cognitive anthropology)
- Colin Renfrew (evolutionary cognitive archaeology, neuroarchaeology)
- Bradd Shore (cognitive anthropology)
- Richard Shweder (cognitive anthropology)
- Dan Sperber (cognitive anthropology)
- Joshua Tenenbaum (computer science, psychology)
- Francisco Varela (neuroscience, philosophy)
- Frans de Waal (ethology, primatology, psychology)
- Étienne Wenger (situated cognition, education)
- James V. Wertsch (cognitive psychology, cultural anthropology)
- Douglas White (anthropology)
- Harvey Whitehouse (social anthropology, cognitive psychology, cultural psychology)
- Richard Wrangham (evolutionary anthropology)
- Thomas G. Wynn (evolutionary cognitive archaeology, cognitive evolution, neuroaesthetics)
- Eviatar Zerubavel (cognitive sociology)

== See also ==
- List of cognitive neuroscientists
- List of cognitive psychologists
- List of computer scientists
- List of Jean Nicod Prize laureates
- List of linguists
- List of neuroscientists
- List of philosophers
- Thinking-related topics
