= Cognitive archaeology =

Archaeological sub-discipline

Cognitive archaeology is a theoretical perspective in archaeology that focuses on the ancient mind. It is divided into two main groups: evolutionary cognitive archaeology (ECA), which seeks to understand human cognitive evolution from the material record, and ideational cognitive archaeology (ICA), which focuses on the symbolic structures discernable in or inferable from past material culture.

== Evolutionary cognitive archaeology (ECA) ==
ECA infers change in ancestral human cognition from the archaeological record, often drawing on the theories, methods, and data of other disciplines: cognitive science, comparative cognition, paleoneurology, experimental replication, and hands-on participation in the manufacture and use of traditional technologies. For example, the 3.3-million-year history of stone tool use has been used to suggest change in cognitive capacities such as intelligence, spatial reasoning, working memory, and executive functioning, as defined by and understood through cognitive psychology and as operationalized to permit their detection in the archaeological record. Other ECA investigations have focused on the development of domain-specific abilities, including theory of mind, creativity and innovation, visual perception and visuospatial abilities, technological reasoning, language, numeracy, and literacy. ECA is broadly analogous to Steven Mithen's categories of cognitive-processual and evolutionary-cognitive archaeology.

Within ECA, there are two main schools of thought. The North American ECA school began in the mid-1970s with the pioneering work of archaeologist Thomas Wynn and biological anthropologist Sue Taylor Parker working with evolutionary neurobiologist Kathleen Gibson. It focuses on understanding human cognitive evolution, either from the artifactual record of forms like stone tools, comparisons of ancestral tool use with that of contemporary species (typically but not exclusively, non-human primates), or both. It often involves descriptive pattern analysis: analyzing change in a form like stone tools over millions of years and interpreting that change in terms of its cognitive significance using theories, constructs, and paradigms from cognitive psychology and neuroscience. An example is the inference of change in working memory from artifactual types involving delayed reward (e.g., traps) by Thomas Wynn and his colleague Frederick L. Coolidge

East of the Atlantic, the British ECA school also began in the mid-1970s with the work of archaeologists Colin Renfrew and John Gowlett and evolutionary primatologist William McGrew. Renfrew's work in particular, as well as that of his student, Lambros Malafouris, has taken a philosophical approach to the study of the ancient mind, drawing on concepts from the philosophy of mind and ecological psychology to examine the role of material structures in human cognition more fundamentally. Renfrew and Malafouris coined the term neuroarchaeology to describe their approach. Renfrew sought to incorporate meaning and symbols in material culture (key pursuits in the developing Post-Processual archaeology of the time) within a framework or structure that would be more empirically testable.

ECA is concerned with how humans think through material structures, with the ability to leverage and exploit material structures for cognitive purposes perhaps being what truly sets human cognition apart from that of all other species. Pottery making is a typical example of this approach. Malafouris does not see the vase as a form created by the potter imposing an internal mental concept on external clay. Instead, the potter's brain and body interact with his materials, the clay and the wheel; the form assumed by the clay is ultimately produced by the complex interaction between the potter's perception of the feel of the clay, the pressure of his fingers on it, and its reactions of texture, moisture content, color, balance, and form. Another example is the work on the cognitive role of material forms in number concepts by Karenleigh A. Overmann, who sees them as the source of properties like discreteness.

Other early ECA pioneers include Glynn Isaac, archaeologist Iain Davidson, and psychologist William Noble. Today, ECA integrates interdisciplinary data from human psychology and neurophysiology, social anthropology, physical anthropology, comparative cognition, and artificial intelligence.

"[ECA continues to] develop many of the same themes raised in the formative decade of cognitive archaeology: the validity and use of ethnoarchaeological and experimental methods; the question of continuities and discontinuities between humans and non-human species; the selection and application of theoretical frameworks, including the displacement of Piagetian theory by contemporary psychological and neuroscientific approaches to brain function and form; the incorporation of interdisciplinary data; the origin of language; the ability of construing intentionality from artifactual form; the philosophical turn in cognitive archaeology; and the riddle of intergenerational accumulation and transmission."

Between 2018 and 2020, cognitive archaeologists Thomas Wynn and Lambros Malafouris headed a collaboration between the University of Colorado, Colorado Springs and the University of Oxford to examine the archaeology of the Lower Paleolithic through the lens of the extended mind; the results were published in the journal Adaptive Behavior in 2021. In 2024, Wynn collaborated with cognitive archaeologist Karenleigh A. Overmann and psychologist Frederick L. Coolidge to co-edit The Oxford Handbook of Cognitive Archaeology, an anthology of 53 contributions from evolutionary and ideational cognitive archaeologists.

== Ideational cognitive archaeology (ICA) ==
Archaeologist Thomas Huffman defined ICA as the study of prehistoric ideology: the ideals, values, and beliefs that constitute a society's worldview. It is analogous to the category Mithen called postprocessual cognitive archaeology.

"Archaeologists can tell from which mountain source a stone axe came, what minerals there are in a bronze bracelet, how old a dug-out canoe is. They can work out the probable cereal-yield from the fields of a Late Bronze Age farm. These are objective matters. But the language, laws, morals, religion of dead societies are different. They belong to the minds of man. Unless they were written down, and even then only if they were recorded accurately, we shall find it hard to recapture them."

— Aubrey Burl, Rites of the Gods (1981, p. 15).

ICA scholars often study the role that ideology and differing organizational approaches would have had on ancient peoples. The way that these abstract ideas are manifested through the remains these peoples have left can be investigated and debated often by drawing inferences and using approaches developed in fields such as semiotics, psychology and the wider sciences.

ICA uses the principles of sociocultural anthropology to investigate such diverse things as material symbols, the use of space, political power, and religion. For example, Huffman uses oral history sources from Zimbabwe and Portuguese documents to attempt to explain symbols discovered in the ruins of Great Zimbabwe, specifically connecting the Shona people's historical association of the right with men and the left with women to the placement of entrances to stone structures. Historian David Beach has pointed out that this ICA may be problematic in its logical leaps and incomplete use of archaeological sources, demonstrating the care that must be used when attempting to explain deep-time intentionality using archaeological evidence.

ICA also works with constructs such as the cognitive map. Humans do not behave under the influence of their senses alone but also through their past experiences such as their upbringing. These experiences contribute to each individual's unique view of the world, a kind of cognitive map that guides them. Groups of people living together tend to develop a shared view of the world and similar cognitive maps, which in turn influence their group material culture.

The multiple interpretations of an artifact, archaeological site or symbol are affected by the archaeologist's own experiences and ideas as well as those of the distant cultural tradition that created it. Cave art, for example, may not have been art in the modern sense at all, but was perhaps the product of ritual. Similarly, it would likely have described activities that were perfectly obvious to the people who created it, but the symbology employed will be different from that used today or at any other time.

Archaeologists have always tried to imagine what motivated people, but early efforts to understand how they thought were unstructured and speculative. Since the rise of processualism, these approaches have become more scientific, paying close attention to the archaeological context of finds and all possible interpretations. For example, a prehistoric bâton de commandement served an unknown purpose, but using ICA to interpret it would involve evaluating all its possible functions using clearly defined procedures and comparisons. By applying logic and experimental evidence, the most likely functions can be isolated.

It can also be argued that the material record shows behavioral traces that are the product of human thought, and thus would have been governed by a multitude of experiences and perspectives with the potential to influence behavior. The combination of material culture and actions can be further developed into a study of the ideas that drove action and used objects. This method attempts to avoid the pitfalls of post-processual archaeology by retaining the 'scientific' aspects of processual archaeology, while reaching for the higher social levels of ideas.

== History of cognitive archaeology ==
Cognitive archaeology began in the 1970s as a reaction to the insistence of processual archaeology that the past be interpreted strictly according to the material evidence. This rigid materialism tended to limit archaeology to finding and describing artifacts, excluding broader interpretations of their possible cognitive and cultural significance as something beyond the reach of inferential reasoning. As social anthropologist Edmund Leach once put it, "all the ingenuity in the world will not replace the evidence that is lost and gone for ever," and "you should recognize your guesses for what they are."

However, processual archaeology also opened up the possibility of investigating the lifestyle of those who made and used material culture. An initial approach was proposed by Lewis Binford, who suggested that ancient lifestyles could be understood by studying the traditional lifestyles of contemporary peoples. While this approach was subject to legitimate criticism, Binford's efforts nonetheless inspired further development of the idea that material forms could be informative about lifestyle, and as the product of intelligent behavior, might provide insight into how and perhaps even what their makers had thought. Archaeologists like Binford have also critiqued cognitive archaeology, stating it is only people's actions rather than their thoughts that are preserved in the archaeological record. ECA has responded to this criticism by stressing that it seeks to understand "how" ancient peoples thought using material structures, not "what" they thought.

Several early books helped popularize the idea that the ancient mind could be investigated and characterized, including Merlin Donald's Origins of the Modern Mind (1991), Steven Mithen's The Prehistory of Mind (1996), and David Lewis-Williams's The Mind in the Cave (2002).

== Major scholars and contributions ==
Several notable scholars have played roles in establishing cognitive archaeology as a discipline.

Merlin Donald has proposed that human cognition developed through a series of stages involving mimetic, mythic, and theoretical forms of culture. Archaeologists have used his concepts to interpret the development of communication, cultural transmission, and symbolism in prehistoric societies.

David Lewis-Williams is known for his work on prehistoric rock art and symbolism. Lewis-Williams draws on ethnographic evidence and studies of altered states of consciousness. He argues that rock art traditions are connected to ritual practices and religious experiences.

Steven Mithen has examined prehistoric intelligence and symbolic behavior. Mithen proposed that early human cognition consisted of specialized forms of intelligence. His ideas have influenced archaeological interpretations of ritual, art, and technological innovation.

Colin Renfrew believed archaeologists could investigate past belief systems, symbols, and social meaning through the material record, which he saw as a source of information not only about how ancient peoples behaved and organized themselves socially, but also how they thought. His publications were foundational in encouraging archaeologists to examine the relationship between material culture and human thinking.

Thomas Wynn has focused on the cognitive abilities of early hominins, as well as the relationship between mental processes and technology. Often working with Frederick L. Coolidge, he has investigated cognitive abilities such as spatial cognition, intelligence, working memory, the executive functions, creativity, and aesthetics.

== Methods in cognitive archaeology ==
“[W]hat makes cognitive archaeology ‘cognitive’ is an interest in cognition and/or the application of cognitive principles to interpreting the material record.” Accordingly, cognitive archaeologists use the material record to investigate ancient thinking and symbolic systems. Since mental processes and beliefs do not themselves survive in material form, they are inferred from ancient technologies and behaviors (ECA) or connected to contemporary peoples and practices (ICA).

Evolutionary cognitive archaeology (ECA) uses inferences. Minimal capacity inferences “identify plausible pre-conditions for the production of some object, and then infer from the objects to those pre-conditions.” In comparison, causal association inferences “draw on multiple lines of evidence to build a case for a (non-necessary) association between a material trace and a feature of past societies.”

Ideational cognitive archaeology (ICA) uses analogies. Formal analogies look for similarities in form between prehistoric and modern artifacts. Genetic analogies establish direct historical or cultural connections between prehistoric and modern artifacts, behaviors, and languages, and they are the basis of the Direct Historical Approach developed by Waldo Rudolph Wedel. Functional analogies consider constraints shared across domains such as neural resources.

== Critiques of cognitive archaeology ==
Cognitive archaeology has come under criticism from archaeologists who are concerned that the inference of thoughts, beliefs, and mental processes from material remains is not reliable. Cognition is not tangible, so interpretations are often based on indirect links among objects and behaviors. As there may be several possible explanations for the same archaeological evidence, discerning which interpretation corresponds to past thinking can be challenging. Processual archaeologists were particularly skeptical of attempts to reconstruct ancient belief systems and symbolic meanings. Lewis Binford claimed that archaeological interpretations should focus on observable patterns in material culture and be based on scientific methods that produce testable explanations. From that perspective, claims about past cognition can be difficult to verify and may reflect the assumptions of modern researchers, rather than the intentions of past peoples. Cognitive archaeology has also been criticized for being too speculative about limited evidence. Proponents of the field, however, have maintained that it is possible to understand ancient thinking and symbolic behavior through cognitive science, ethnographic comparisons, experimental archaeology, and the use of multiple lines of evidence. Debate around interpretations and methodologies remain a crucial part of cognitive archaeology.

== See also ==
- 4E cognition
- Neuroarchaeology
