= Beeches Pit =

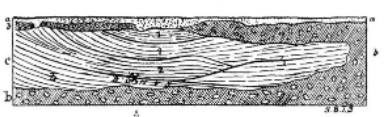
Skertchly's diagram showing a section of the northern face of the Pit, as published in Memoirs of the Geological Survey: The Geology of Parts of Cambridgeshire and of Suffolk in 1891

Beeches Pit is an archaeological site in Suffolk, England, dated to around 0.4 million years ago. It contains palaeoenvironmental remains, and is particularly notable because it provides evidence of the human use of fire, the earliest in Britain and one of the earliest in Europe. In addition, knapping debris and Acheulean hand axes have been found. It is one of the richest sites in England for evidence of human activity during that period, and the hand axes are the "earliest post-Anglian handaxe-making horizon in Britain".

The site is in an old brick pit, near West Stow, south of Thetford Forest in Suffolk. Biostratigraphy, amino acid racemisation, and thermoluminescence dating on burnt flint confirm the dating of Marine Isotope Stage 11. The first geological description and record came from a man named Sydney Barber Josiah Skertchly, who was then working in Suffolk for the British Geological Survey, in the 1870s. Further geological research took place between 1991 and 2006; excavations were done by John Gowlett in the 1990s, focusing on two areas, named AF and AH, on the pit's northwestern side.

The pit evidences a rich fauna including mollusks, wood mice, fallow deer, and other animals, who lived in a water-rich environment in a woodland, with human occupation taking place at a time when there were higher temperatures in the summer and more rainfall than today. The molluscs may relate the site to the site now at Swanscombe Heritage Park, which provide evidence of the earliest human beings in England.

At Beeches Pit, humans occupied an area on the north side of a river bank; there was a spring nearby, and flint was available. John Gowlett noted how all seven bifaces (found in two different places) were quite different from each other (and showed more variation than the set found at Kilombe Archeological site in Kenya). One location contained two small hand axes (as well as blanks that could have produced more), but they are "considerably different from one another". The other five, found in the second location, also showed "different approaches to manufacture, and different design targets". Thus the seven hand axes are taken as evidence of the Acheulean pattern which allowed for individuality within certain parameters.

The fires at Beeches pit were large, and were kept going for long periods of time. While one researcher suggested this might evidence that the humans occupying the site could not kindle any fire independently, and thus had to keep it going constantly, others see that as evidence of the place being a kind of home base, where those who remained in the camp while others left kept large fires for "warmth, safety and entertainment", wood being plentiful.
