= Thomas G. Wynn =

American archaeologist

Thomas G. Wynn is an American archaeologist known for his work in cognitive archaeology. He is a pioneer of evolutionary cognitive archaeology; his article "The intelligence of later Acheulean hominids" (Man, 1979) is considered a classic in the field. He taught at the University of Colorado, Colorado Springs from 1977 to 2022, where he now holds the title Distinguished Professor Emeritus.

== Education ==
Wynn completed his doctorate in anthropology in 1977 at the University of Illinois, Urbana under the supervision of anthropologist Charles M. Keller. The project used Piagetian psychological theory to document cognitive evolution as represented in the change in form of stone tools; the work was ultimately published as a book, The Evolution of Spatial Competence, in 1989.

== Research ==
Over the course of his archaeological career, Wynn has worked on the evolutionary development of working memory, expert technical cognition, pre-symbolic aesthetic cognition, and spatial cognition, and he has deepened the understanding of the Palaeolithic record and the cognitive implications of handaxe manufacture and use. Beyond being one of cognitive archaeology's early research pioneers, Wynn has provided epistemological and methodological leadership to the field.

In the 1970s and 1980s, Wynn worked on archaeological projects in Europe and Africa, directing the first systematic archaeological field work in the Mbeya Region of Tanzania in 1976 and 1980. To date, he has published over 150 articles, chapters, and books in Palaeolithic studies, with a particular emphasis on cognitive evolution.

With his colleague, psychologist Frederick L. Coolidge, Wynn developed the Enhanced Working Memory Hypothesis (EWMH), which proposes that a small but heritable change in executive functioning may have been the reason why Homo sapiens persisted and flourished, while cousin species like the Neandertals went extinct. With Coolidge and cognitive archaeologist Karenleigh A. Overmann, Wynn has written about the cognitive differences between Neandertals and contemporary Homo sapiens and the implications for Neandertal extinction.

In 2011, Wynn and Coolidge established the Center for Cognitive Archaeology at the University of Colorado, Colorado Springs. In 2013, Wynn began working with LA artist Tony Berlant on an exhibition of Acheulean handaxes that celebrated their importance in the evolution of aesthetic sensibility. Entitled "First Sculpture", the exhibit was mounted at the Nasher Sculpture Center, Dallas, in 2018 and published as a volume the same year. Wynn and Berlant continued to collaborate on Mimbres painting, with an exhibition at the Los Angeles County Museum of Art and associated publication in 2018.

== Honors ==
In 2008, Wynn was awarded funding to organize the 139th Numbered Wenner-Gren Symposium, which Coolidge co-chaired. Entitled "Working Memory: Beyond Language and Symbolism," the proceedings were published as a special issue of Current Anthropology.

In 2014, Wynn was appointed University of Colorado Distinguished Professor in recognition of his contributions to cognitive archaeology.

== Selected works ==
=== Authored books ===
- Wynn, Thomas (1989). The Evolution of Spatial Competence. University of Illinois Press. ISBN 9780252060304.
- Wynn, Thomas; Coolidge, Frederick L. (2012). How to Think like a Neandertal. Oxford University Press. ISBN 9780199742820.
- Berlant, Tony; Wynn, Thomas (2018). First Sculpture: Handaxe to Figure Stone. Nasher Sculpture Center. ISBN 9780991233878.
- Coolidge, Frederick L.; Wynn, Thomas (2018). The Rise of Homo sapiens: The Evolution of Modern Thinking (2nd ed.). Oxford University Press. ISBN 9780190680916.
- Wynn, Thomas; Coolidge, Frederick L. (2022). An Introduction to Evolutionary Cognitive Archaeology. Routledge. ISBN 9780367856953.

=== Edited volumes ===
- De Beaune, Sophie A.; Coolidge, Frederick L.; Wynn, Thomas, eds. (2009). Cognitive Archaeology and Human Evolution. Cambridge University Press. ISBN 9780521769778.
- Wynn, Thomas; Coolidge, Frederick L., eds. (2017). Cognitive Models in Palaeolithic Archaeology. Oxford University Press. ISBN 9780190204112.
- Wynn, Thomas; Overmann, Karenleigh A.; Coolidge, Frederick L., eds. (2024). The Oxford Handbook of Cognitive Archaeology. Oxford University Press. ISBN 9780192895950.

=== Special journal issues ===
- Wynn, Thomas; Coolidge, Frederick L., eds. (2010). "Working Memory: Beyond Symbolism and Language". Current Anthropology. Wenner-Gren Symposium Series. 51 (S1). University of Chicago Press.
- Wynn, Thomas; Overmann, Karenleigh A.; Malafouris, Lambros, eds. (2021). "4E Cognition in the Lower Palaeolithic". Adaptive Behavior. 29 (2).

=== Articles ===
- Wynn, Thomas (1979). "The Intelligence of Later Acheulean Hominids". Man. 14 (3): 371–391. doi:10.2307/2801865. JSTOR 2801865.
- Wynn, Thomas (1981). "The Intelligence of Oldowan Hominids". Journal of Human Evolution. 10 (7): 529–541. Bibcode:1981JHumE..10..529W. doi:10.1016/S0047-2484(81)80046-2.
- Wynn, Thomas; McGrew, William C. (1989). "An Ape's View of the Oldowan". Man. 24 (3): 383–398. doi:10.2307/2802697. JSTOR 2802697.
- Wynn, Thomas (1993). "Two Developments in the Mind of Early Homo". Journal of Anthropological Archaeology. 12 (3): 299–322. doi:10.1006/jaar.1993.1009.
- Wynn, Thomas (1995). "Handaxe Enigmas". World Archaeology. 27 (1): 10–24. Bibcode:1995WoArc..27...10W. doi:10.1080/00438243.1995.9980290.
- Wynn, Thomas (2002). "Archaeology and Cognitive Evolution". Behavioral and Brain Sciences. 25 (3): 389–402. doi:10.1017/S0140525X02000079. PMID 12879699.
- Wynn, Thomas; Coolidge, Frederick L. (2003). "The Role of Working Memory in the Evolution of Managed Foraging". Before Farming. 2 (1): 1–16. doi:10.3828/bfarm.2003.2.1.
- Wynn, Thomas; Coolidge, Frederick L. (2004). "The Expert Neandertal Mind". Journal of Human Evolution. 46 (4): 467–487. Bibcode:2004JHumE..46..467W. doi:10.1016/j.jhevol.2004.01.005. PMID 15066380.
- Wynn, Thomas; Coolidge, Frederick L. (2008). "Why Not Cognition?". Current Anthropology. 49 (5): 895–897. doi:10.1086/524386. S2CID 145732440.
- Wynn, Thomas (2009). "Hafted Spears and the Archaeology of Mind". Proceedings of the National Academy of Sciences of the United States of America. 106 (24): 9544–9545. Bibcode:2009PNAS..106.9544W. doi:10.1073/pnas.0904369106. PMC 2701010. PMID 19506246.
- Wynn, Thomas; Coolidge, Frederick L. (2010). "Beyond Symbolism and Language: An Introduction to Supplement 1, Working Memory". Current Anthropology. 51 (S1): 5–16. doi:10.1086/650526. S2CID 142942270.
- Wynn, Thomas; Hernandez-Aguilar, R. Adriana; Marchant, Linda F.; McGrew, William C. (2011). "'An Ape's View of the Oldowan' Revisited". Evolutionary Anthropology. 20 (5): 181–197. doi:10.1002/evan.20323. PMID 22034236. S2CID 23910905.
- Wynn, Thomas; Coolidge, Frederick L. (2016). "Archaeological Insights into Hominin Cognitive Evolution". Evolutionary Anthropology. 25 (4): 200–213. doi:10.1002/evan.21496. PMID 27519459. S2CID 12334658.
- Wynn, Thomas; Gowlett, John (2018). "The Handaxe Reconsidered". Evolutionary Anthropology. 27 (1): 21–29. doi:10.1002/evan.21552. PMID 29446559. S2CID 3678641.
- Wynn, Thomas (2021). "Ergonomic Clusters and Displaced Affordances in Early Lithic Technology". Adaptive Behavior. 29 (2): 181–195. doi:10.1177/1059712320932333. S2CID 225646865.

=== Book chapters ===
- Wynn, Thomas (2004). "Evolutionary Developments in the Cognition of Symmetry". In Washburn, Dorothy Koster (ed.). Embedded Symmetries, Natural and Cultural. University of New Mexico Press. ISBN 9780826331526.
- Wynn, Thomas; Coolidge, Frederick L. (2007). "Did a Small but Significant Enhancement in Working Memory Capacity Power the Evolution of Modern Thinking?". In Paul, Mellars; Boyle, Katie; Ofer, Bar-Yosef; Christopher B, Stringer (eds.). Rethinking the Human Revolution: New Behavioural and Biological Perspectives on the Origin and Dispersal of Modern Humans. McDonald Institute for Archaeological Research. ISBN 9781902937465.
- Wynn, Thomas; Coolidge, Frederick L. (2009). "Implications of a Strict Standard for Recognizing Modern Cognition in Prehistory". In De Beaune, Sophie A.; Coolidge, Frederick L.; Wynn, Thomas (eds.). Cognitive Archaeology and Human Evolution. Cambridge University Press. ISBN 9780521769778.
- Wynn, Thomas; Coolidge, Frederick L. (2010). "How Levallois Reduction Is Similar to, and Not Similar to, Playing Chess". In Nowell, April; Davidson, Iain (eds.). Stone Tools and the Evolution of Human Cognition. University of Colorado Press. ISBN 9781607321354.
- Wynn, Thomas; Haidle, Miriam Noël; Lombard, Marlize; Coolidge, Frederick L. (2017). "The Expert Cognition Model in Human Evolutionary Studies". In Wynn, Thomas; Coolidge, Frederick L. (eds.). Cognitive Models in Palaeolithic Archaeology. Oxford University Press. ISBN 9780190204112.
- Wynn, Thomas (2019). "Epilogue: Situating the Cognitive in Cognitive Archaeology". In Overmann, Karenleigh A.; Coolidge, Frederick L. (eds.). Squeezing Minds from Stones: Cognitive Archaeology and the Evolution of the Human Mind. Oxford University Press. ISBN 9780190854614.

== See also ==
- Neuroarchaeology – Archaeological sub-discipline
- Neuroesthetics – Neuroscientific approaches purposed under the scope of applied aesthetics
- Venus of Berekhat Ram – Alleged oldest artifact
