= Gagnepain =

Gagnepain is a French surname. Notable people with the surname include:

- François Gagnepain (1866–1952), French botanist
- Jean Gagnepain (1923–2006), French linguist and anthropologist
- Xavier Gagnepain (born 1960), French cellist
