= Frederick Coolidge =

Frederick Coolidge may refer to:

- Frederick L. Coolidge, American psychologist
- Frederick S. Coolidge, U.S. Representative from Massachusetts
