= Colin Renfrew =

British archaeologist (1937–2024)

The Right Honourable The Lord Renfrew of Kaimsthorn FBA FSA HonFSAScot
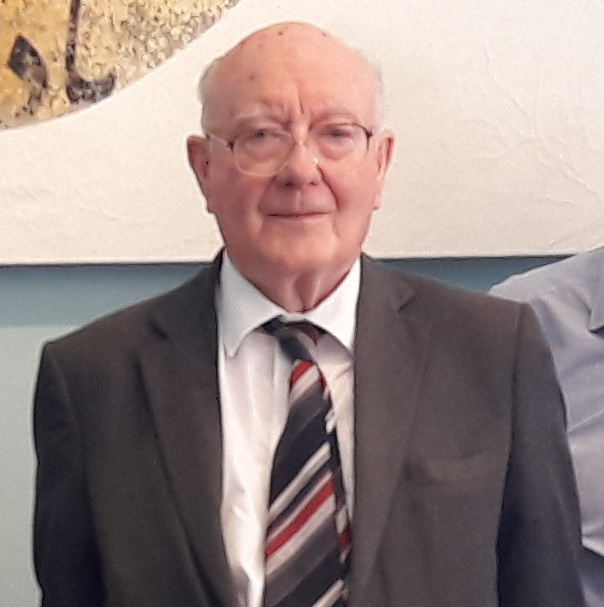
- Renfrew in 2018

Member of the House of Lords
- Lord Temporal
- Life peerage 24 June 1991 – 15 September 2021

Disney Professor of Archaeology University of Cambridge
- In office 1981–2004
- Preceded by: Glyn Daniel
- Succeeded by: Graeme Barker

Master of Jesus College, Cambridge
- In office 1986–1996
- Preceded by: Sir Alan Cottrell
- Succeeded by: David Crighton

Personal details
- Born: Andrew Colin Renfrew; 25 July 1937 Stockton-on-Tees, England
- Died: 24 November 2024 (aged 87) Cambridge, England
- Party: Conservative
- Education: St Albans School, Hertfordshire; St John's College, Cambridge

Military service
- Allegiance: United Kingdom
- Branch: Royal Air Force
- Service years: 1956–1958

Andrew Colin Renfrew, Baron Renfrew of Kaimsthorn (25 July 1937 – 24 November 2024) was a British archaeologist, paleolinguist and Conservative peer noted for his work on radiocarbon dating, the prehistory of languages, archaeogenetics, neuroarchaeology, and the prevention of looting at archaeological sites.

Renfrew was also the Disney Professor of Archaeology at the University of Cambridge and Director of the McDonald Institute for Archaeological Research, and was a Senior Fellow of the McDonald Institute for Archaeological Research.

== Early life and education ==
Renfrew was educated at St Albans School, Hertfordshire; where one of the houses is now named after him. From 1956 to 1958, he did National Service in the Royal Air Force. On 21 June 1956, he was granted a national service commission in the Technical Branch with the rank of pilot officer. Having completed his full-time service, he transferred to the reserve (national service list) on 25 March 1958. He was promoted to flying officer on 25 June 1958, with seniority in that rank from 25 March 1958.

He then went up to St John's College, Cambridge, where he first read Natural Sciences, and then Archaeology and Anthropology, graduating in 1962. He was elected president of Cambridge Union in 1961 and was a member of the University of Cambridge's Archaeological Field Club (AFC). He had run against and lost an election to Barry Cunliffe to become president of the AFC. In 1965, he completed his PhD thesis Neolithic and Bronze Age cultures of the Cyclades and their external relations. In the same year, he married Jane M. Ewbank.

== Academic ==
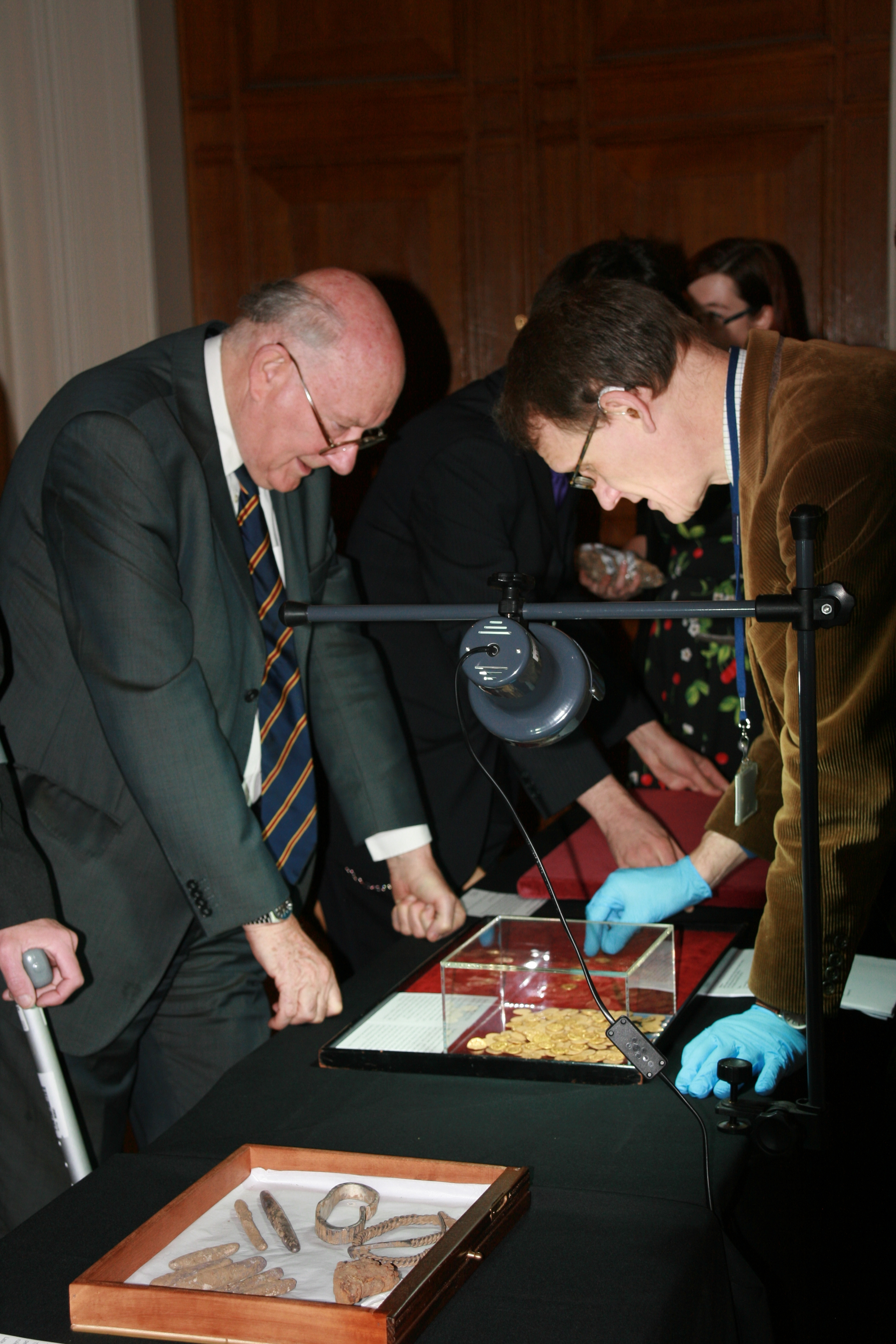
Lord Renfrew looking at artefacts including Roman gold coins

In 1965, Renfrew was appointed to the post of lecturer in the Department of Prehistory and Archaeology at the University of Sheffield. Between 1968 and 1970, he directed excavations at Sitagroi, Greece. In the 1968 Sheffield Brightside by-election he unsuccessfully contested this parliamentary constituency on behalf of the Conservative Party. He was elected a Fellow of the Society of Antiquaries in that same year, Fellow of the Society of Antiquaries of Scotland in 1970, and an Honorary Fellow of the Society of Antiquaries of Scotland in 2000.

In 1972, Renfrew became Professor of Archaeology at the University of Southampton, succeeding Barry Cunliffe. During his time at Southampton, he directed excavations at Quanterness in Orkney and Phylakopi on the island of Milos, Greece. In 1973, Renfrew published Before Civilisation: The Radiocarbon Revolution and Prehistoric Europe in which he challenged the assumption that prehistoric cultural innovation originated in the Near East and then spread to Europe. He also excavated with Marija Gimbutas at Sitagroi.

In 1980, Renfrew was elected a Fellow of the British Academy. In 1981 he was elected to the Disney Professorship of Archaeology in the University of Cambridge, a post he held until his retirement. In 1990 Renfrew was appointed the founding Director of the McDonald Institute for Archaeological Research.

In 1987, he published Archaeology and Language: The Puzzle of the Indo-European Origins, a book on the Proto-Indo-Europeans. His "Anatolian hypothesis" posited that this group lived 2,000 years before the Kurgans, in Anatolia, later diffusing to Greece, then Italy, Sicily, Corsica, the Mediterranean coast of France, Spain, and Portugal. Another branch migrated along the fertile river valleys of the Danube and Rhine into central and northern Europe.

The Anatolian hypothesis argued that Proto-Indo-European, the reconstructed ancestor of the Indo-European languages, originated approximately 9,000 years ago in Anatolia and moved with the spread of farming throughout the Mediterranean and into central and northern Europe. This hypothesis contradicted Marija Gimbutas's Kurgan hypothesis, which states that Proto-Indo-European was spread by a migration of peoples from the Pontic–Caspian steppe approximately 6,000 years ago.

From 1987 to 1991, he co-directed excavations at Markiani on Amorgos and at Dhaskalio Kavos, Keros, Greece.

Renfrew's work in using the archaeological record as the basis for understanding the ancient mind was foundational to the field of evolutionary cognitive archaeology. Renfrew and his student, Lambros Malafouris, coined the phrase neuroarchaeology to describe an archaeology of mind.

In 1996, Renfrew formulated the so-called "sapient paradox": "why was there such a long gap between emergence of genetically and anatomically modern humans and the development of complex behaviors?"

Renfrew served as Master of Jesus College, Cambridge from 1986 until 1997. In 2004, he retired from the Disney Professorship and was a Senior Fellow at the McDonald Institute. From 2006 to 2008 he directed new excavations on the Cycladic Island of Keros and was recently co-director of the Keros Island Survey. He died on 24 November 2024, at the age of 87.

== Positions, awards and accolades ==
- Fellow of the British Academy (1980)
- Made a life peer on 24 June 1991 as Baron Renfrew of Kaimsthorn, of Hurlet, in the District of Renfrew.
- Foreign Associate to the National Academy of Sciences of the USA 1996.
- Balzan Prize, given in Prehistoric Archaeology for 2004.
- Chair, Managing Council for the British School at Athens, since 2004.
- Visiting Scholar, Cotsen Institute of Archaeology, UCLA, 2005–06.
- Member of the American Philosophical Society since 2006.
- Honorary degrees from the Universities of Sheffield, Athens, Southampton, Liverpool, Edinburgh, St Andrews, Kent, London and Lima.

== Books ==
- Renfrew, A.C., 1972, The Emergence of Civilisation: The Cyclades and the Aegean in The Third Millennium BC, London. ISBN 0-9774094-6-5 (2011 edition)
- Renfrew, A.C., 1973, Before Civilisation, the Radiocarbon Revolution and Prehistoric Europe, London: Pimlico. ISBN 0-7126-6593-5
- Renfrew, A.C. and Kenneth L. Cooke, eds. 1979 Transformations: Mathematical Approaches to Culture Change. New York: Academic Press. ISBN 978-0-12-586050-5
- Renfrew, A.C. and Malcolm Wagstaff, eds., 1982, An Island Polity, the Archaeology of Exploitation in Melos, Cambridge: Cambridge University Press.
- Renfrew, Colin, 1984, Approaches to Social Archaeology, Edinburgh: Edinburgh University Press. ISBN 0-85224-481-9
- Renfrew, A.C., ed. 1985, The Archaeology of Cult, the Sanctuary at Phylakopi, London: British School at Athens / Thames & Hudson.
- Colin Renfrew, Marija Gimbutas and Ernestine S. Elster, eds. 1986. Excavations at Sitagroi, a prehistoric village in northeast Greece. Vol. 1. Los Angeles : Institute of Archaeology, University of California.
- Renfrew, Colin, 1987, Archaeology and Language: The Puzzle of Indo-European Origins, London: Cape (Pimlico). ISBN 0-224-02495-7
- Renfrew, A.C. and Ezra B. W. Zubrow, eds. 1994, The Ancient Mind: Elements of Cognitive Archaeology. Cambridge: Cambridge University Press. ISBN 978-0-521-45620-3
- Renfrew, A.C. and Paul Bahn, 1991, Archaeology: Theories, Methods and Practice, London: Thames & Hudson. ISBN 0-500-28147-5. (Sixth edition 2012)
- Renfrew, A.C., 2000, Loot, Legitimacy and Ownership: The Ethical Crisis in Archaeology, London: Duckworth. ISBN 0-7156-3034-2
- Renfrew, A.C., 2003, Figuring It Out: The Parallel Visions of Artists and Archaeologists, London: Thames & Hudson. ISBN 0-500-05114-3
- Ernestine S. Elster and Colin Renfrew, eds., 2003. Prehistoric Sitagroi: Excavations in Northeast Greece, 1968–1970. Vol. 2: The Final Report. Los Angeles, CA: Cotsen Institute of Archaeology at UCLA. Monumenta archaeologica 20.
- Renfrew, A.C., and Paul Bahn, eds. Archaeology: The Key Concepts. London: Routledge, 2005. ISBN 1-134-37040-7
- Renfrew, A.C., and Paul Bahn, Archaeology Essentials: Theories, Methods and Practice, London: Thames & Hudson. ISBN 978-0-500-84138-9. (Fourth edition 2018).
- Renfrew, A.C., 2008, Prehistory: The Making of the Human Mind, Modern Library. ISBN 0-679-64097-5
- Matsumura S., Forster P. and Renfrew C., eds., 2008, Simulations, Genetics and Human Prehistory, Cambridge: McDonald Institute for Archeological Research. ISBN 978-1-902937-45-8

== Articles ==
- "Models of change in language and archaeology", Transactions of the Philological Society 87 (1989): 103–55.
- "Archaeology, genetics and linguistic diversity", Man 27 (1992): 445–78.
- "Time depth, convergence theory, and innovation in Proto-Indo-European: 'Old Europe' as a PIE linguistic area", Journal of Indo-European Studies 27 (1999): 257–93.
- "'Indo-European' designates languages: not pots and not institutions", Antiquity 79 (2005): 692–5.
- "Archaeogenetics", in Archaeology: The Key Concepts, eds. Colin Renfrew & Paul Bahn. London: Routledge, 2005, pp. 16–20.
- "Phylogenetic network analysis of SARS-CoV-2 genomes", Proceedings of the National Academy of Sciences of the United States of America, 8 April 2020

== See also ==
- Anatolian hypothesis
- Neuroarchaeology
- Evolutionary Cognitive Archaeology

Academic offices
Preceded by Glyn Daniel	Disney Professor of Archaeology, Cambridge University; 1981–2004	Succeeded by Graeme Barker
Preceded by Sir Alan Cottrell	Master of Jesus College, Cambridge; 1986–1996	Succeeded by David Crighton
