= Sapient paradox =

Question of why human behavioral complexity is so recent compared to humanity's origins

The sapient paradox is a question that can be formulated as "why there was such a long gap between emergence of genetically and anatomically modern humans and the development of complex behaviors?" Homo sapiens emerged as a species somewhere between 60,000 and 100,000 (or even 200,000) years ago, but the behaviour that is associated with modern humans began to emerge and accelerate only 10,000 years ago. The question was first formulated by archaeologist Colin Renfrew in 1996.

== See also ==
- Timeline of prehistory
- Ancient history
- The Great Filter
- Fermi paradox
- Linguistic monogenesis and polygenesis
