= Karenleigh A. Overmann =

American archaeologist

Karenleigh A. Overmann is a cognitive archaeologist known for her work on how ancient societies became numerate and literate. She currently directs the Center for Cognitive Archaeology at the University of Colorado, Colorado Springs. Before becoming an academic researcher, Overmann served 25 years of active duty in the U.S. Navy.

== Education ==
Overmann completed her master's in psychology in 2013 at the University of Colorado, Colorado Springs, under the supervision of Frederick L. Coolidge and Thomas G. Wynn and her doctorate in archaeology in 2016 at the University of Oxford as a Clarendon Scholar under the supervision of Lambros Malafouris and Chris Gosden. From 2018 to 2020, Overmann was a Marie Skłodowska-Curie Actions (MSCA) postdoctoral research fellow at the University of Bergen (project 785793).

== Work on numeracy ==
Overmann has published several works showing how numbers are realized and elaborated through the use of material forms; these make the innate sense of number tangible and tractable to manipulation. She describes the role of "the material devices used to represent and manipulate numbers—fingers, tallies, tokens, and written notations—[as] the mechanism for their elaboration and the source of their various properties. With this model, cross-cultural variability becomes a simple matter of whether material devices are used, which devices are used, and how those devices are used." The "technological layering of material forms [is] systematized by device affordances and limitations that predictably and reliably emerge from the interaction of numerosity, material form, behaviors, and social needs." This research has been highlighted as "a naturalistically plausible account of the emergence of the modern natural number concept" and "a 'Copernican Revolution' in the way we understand the relationship between numbers and the material devices we use to record and manipulate them."

She has analyzed counting artifacts from the Ancient Near East, including fingers (as indicated by Sumerian vocabulary), tallies (as archaeologically attested), tokens (archaeologically and textually attested), and notations (textually attested). She later expanded the catalogue of Near Eastern tokens published by Denise Schmandt-Besserat in 1992 with over 2,300 new entries. The results of analyzing the updated token catalogue were published in 2019 as a component of Overmann's book, The Material Origin of Numbers.

Overmann has also investigated the traditional counting methods used in Oceania, particularly Polynesia; this research solved two mysteries of several centuries' standing: what was meant by the claim that Māori counted by "elevens" and why the Hawaiian word for twenty, iwakalua, meant "nine and two"; both are related to the method of counting by sorting used in Polynesia. She coined the term "ephemeral abacus" to refer to temporary material forms with inherent place value (exponential structure), including collaborative finger-counting and counting by sorting. In 2021, she published a detailed comparison of Polynesian and Mesopotamian numbers, both of which use object-specified counting sequences; the more recent counting practices of Polynesia provide a new way to understand how such counting would have worked in ancient times.

== Work on early writing systems and literacy ==
Overmann has analyzed early writing in Mesopotamia, showing how script and literacy emerged from the practice of handwriting small pictures over the course of about 15 centuries of time, and extended the analysis to examine writing as an example of extended cognition. In 2024, she described this as the development of complementarity: "The material component of writing complements the psychological component of literacy, and vice versa. Following Menary, I use the term complementarity to mean that 'bodily internal and external processes coordinate with one another in the completion of cognitive tasks'. However, I want to go beyond this sense to emphasize that the literacy we enjoy today is the result of the material form that is writing changing in its form and functions and the brain reorganizing neurologically to interact with it. That is, the material and psychological components have both changed in ways that maximize the efficiency of their interaction with each other." Often working in conjunction with archaeologist Thomas G. Wynn, she has applied insights gained from her analyses of the way writing changes over time to stone tools in the Lower Paleolithic.

== Other work ==
Beyond her work in numeracy and literacy, Overmann has analyzed the material component of timekeeping for its effects on the conceptualization of time. With her colleagues Thomas Wynn and Frederick L. Coolidge, she has written about the cognitive differences between Neandertals and contemporary Homo sapiens and the implications for Neandertal extinction. She has also analyzed Jane Austen's novel Emma as a gender-reversed version of Pride and Prejudice and written about conceptions of the mind and madness in the Regency era.

== Selected works ==
=== Authored books ===
- Overmann, Karenleigh A. (2019). The Material Origin of Numbers: Insights from the Archaeology of the Ancient Near East. Gorgias Studies in the Ancient Near East 14. Gorgias Press. ISBN 978-1-4632-0743-4.
- Overmann, Karenleigh A. (2023). The Materiality of Numbers: Emergence and Elaboration from Prehistory to Present. Cambridge University Press. ISBN 978-1-009-36124-8.
- Overmann, Karenleigh A. (2025). Cultural Number Systems: A Sourcebook. Springer. ISBN 978-3-031-83382-3.

=== Edited volumes ===
- Overmann, Karenleigh A.; Coolidge, Frederick L., eds. (2019). Squeezing Minds from Stones: Cognitive Archaeology and the Evolution of the Human Mind. Oxford University Press. ISBN 978-0-19-085461-4.
- Gabriel, Gösta; Overmann, Karenleigh A.; Payne, Annick, eds. (2021). Signs – Sounds – Semantics. Nature and Transformation of Writing Systems in the Ancient Near East. Wiener Offene Orientalistik 13. Ugarit-Verlag. ISBN 978-3-86835-318-1.
- Wynn, Thomas; Overmann, Karenleigh A.; Coolidge, Frederick L., eds. (2024). The Oxford Handbook of Cognitive Archaeology. Oxford University Press. ISBN 978-0-19-289595-0.

=== Special journal issues ===
- Malafouris, Lambros; Gosden, Chris; Overmann, Karenleigh A., eds. (2014). "Creativity, Cognition & Material Culture". Pragmatics and Cognition.
- Wynn, Thomas; Overmann, Karenleigh A.; Malafouris, Lambros, eds. (2021). "4E Cognition in the Lower Palaeolithic". Adaptive Behavior.
- Van Mazijk, Corijn; Killin, Anton; Overmann, Karenleigh A., eds. (2025). "Philosophy and prehistory: New perspectives on minds, art, and culture". Phenomenology and the Cognitive Sciences.

=== Articles on numbers ===
- Coolidge, Frederick L.; Overmann, Karenleigh A. (2012). "Numerosity, Abstraction, and the Emergence of Symbolic Thinking". Current Anthropology. 53 (2): 204–225. doi:10.1086/664818. S2CID 51918452.
- Overmann, Karenleigh A. (2016). "The Role of Materiality in Numerical Cognition". Quaternary International. 405: 42–51. Bibcode:2016QuInt.405...42O. doi:10.1016/j.quaint.2015.05.026. S2CID 127414676.
- Overmann, Karenleigh A. (2018). "Constructing a Concept of Number". Journal of Numerical Cognition. 4 (2): 464–493. doi:10.5964/jnc.v4i2.161. hdl:20.500.12034/1301. S2CID 52197209.
- Overmann, Karenleigh A. (2020). "The Curious Idea that Māori Once Counted by Elevens, and the Insights It Still Holds for Cross-Cultural Numerical Research". Journal of the Polynesian Society. 129 (1): 59–84. JSTOR 26912185. S2CID 216446981.
- Overmann, Karenleigh A. (2021). "Finger-counting and Numerical Structure". Frontiers in Psychology. 12 723492. doi:10.3389/fpsyg.2021.723492. PMC 8506119. PMID 34650482.
- Overmann, Karenleigh A. (2021). "A New Look at Old Numbers, and What It Reveals about Numeration". Journal of Near Eastern Studies. 80 (2): 291–321. doi:10.1086/715767. S2CID 239028709.
- Overmann, Karenleigh A. (2021). "Numerical Origins: The Critical Questions". Journal of Cognition and Culture. 21 (5): 449–468. doi:10.1163/15685373-12340121.
- Overmann, Karenleigh A.; Chacon, Thiago; Payne, Annick (2022). "Desana numerical symbols: An indigenous creation narrated by Diakuru and Kisibi". Written Language & Literacy. 25 (2): 133–158. doi:10.1075/wll.00064.ove.
- Overmann, Karenleigh A (2024). "Strange and wonderful: Numbers through a new (material) lens". Cuneiform Digital Library Journal. 2: 1–21.
- Florio, Cinzia; Overmann, Karenleigh A. (2025). "Inka Numbers, Khipu, and Yupana: a Reanalysis". Journal of Cognition and Culture. 25 (1–2): 128–158. doi:10.1163/15685373-12340204.

=== Articles on early writing systems ===
- Overmann, Karenleigh A. (2016). "Beyond Writing: The Development of Literacy in the Ancient Near East". Cambridge Archaeological Journal. 267 (2): 285–303. doi:10.1017/S0959774316000019. S2CID 163840618.
- Overmann, Karenleigh A.; Wynn, Thomas (2019). "Materiality and Human Cognition". Journal of Archaeological Method and Theory. 26 (2): 457–478. doi:10.1007/s10816-018-9378-y. S2CID 254598627.
- Overmann, Karenleigh A. (2022). "Early Writing: A Cognitive Archaeological Perspective on Literacy and Numeracy". Visible Language. 56 (1): 8–44. doi:10.34314/vl.v56i1.4934.
- Overmann, Karenleigh A (2024). "Writing as an extended cognitive system". Phenomenology and the Cognitive Sciences. 24 (3): 535–555. doi:10.1007/s11097-023-09955-6.

=== Book chapters ===
- Overmann, Karenleigh A. (2021). "A Cognitive Archaeology of Writing: Concepts, Models, Goals". In Boyes, Philip; Steele, Philippa; Astoreca, Natalia Elvira (eds.). The Social and Cultural Contexts of Historic Writing Practices. Oxbow. ISBN 978-1-78925-481-5.
- Overmann, Karenleigh A. (2021). "Writing System Transmission and Change: A Neurofunctional Perspective". In Gabriel, Gösta; Overmann, Karenleigh A.; Payne, Annick (eds.). Signs – Sounds – Semantics. Nature and Transformation of Writing Systems in the Ancient Near East. Ugarit-Verlag. ISBN 978-3-86835-318-1.
- Overmann, Karenleigh A. (2024). "Prehistoric numeracy: Approaches, assumptions, and issues". In Wynn, Thomas; Overmann, Karenleigh A.; Coolidge, Frederick L. (eds.). The Oxford Handbook of Cognitive Archaeology. Oxford University Press. ISBN 978-0-19-289595-0.

== See also ==
- Cognitive archaeology
- Neuroarchaeology
- History of ancient numeral systems
- Alleged use of undecimal numbers by the Māori
- René Lesson and Māori counting by elevens
- Binary counting in Mangareva
- Gender reversal in Emma
