= Mimetic theory of speech origins =

Theory in evolutionary anthropology and linguistics

In evolutionary anthropology and evolutionary linguistics, the mimetic theory of speech origins is an analysis of the factors leading to the evolution of language in human ancestors, typically during the Homo erectus era.

This theory is most commonly associated with Merlin Donald, who developed the idea in his 1991 book Origins of the Modern Mind. He viewed mimetic theory as the fundamental pillar in his three-part model of the development of symbolic culture and symbolic cognition.

== Overview ==
The mimetic theory of development was the central pillar in Donald's three-part model of symbolic cognition proposed in his 1991 book Origins of the Modern Mind.

Origins of the Modern Mind proposes a three-stage development of human symbolic capacity through culture:

Mimetic culture: The watershed adaptation allowing humans to function as symbolic and cultural beings was a revolutionary improvement in motor control, the "mimetic skill" required to rehearse and refine the body's movements in a voluntary and systematic way, to remember those rehearsals, and to reproduce them on command. Following this development, Homo erectus assimilated and re-conceptualized events to create various prelinguistic symbolic traditions such as rituals, dance, and craft.

Mythic cultures arose as a result of the acquisition of speech and the invention of symbols. Mimetic representation serves as a preadaptation to this development.

Technology-supported culture: Finally, the cognitive ecology dominated by ephemeral face-to-face communication has changed for most of us as a result of the external memory-store that reading and writing permit. Computer technology intensifies these changes by offering even more extensive capacities for external storage and retrieval of information."

Donald argues for a four-phase process of development in the hominid brain in memory and social-cognitive systems that left humans with the cognitive infrastructure that we still retain today.

- Phase 1 was the development of episodic memory in primates
- He traces how the evolutionary lineage of the brain brought about Phase 2, a mimetic culture, based on pantomiming and simplistic vocalizations to convey intentionality,
- Phase 3 was mythic culture, which used simplistic forms of story-sharing to form the basis of the first hominids trying to model their environment, its origins, and their place within it,
- Phase 4 was a theoretic culture, which had the capability for higher orders of cognitive-processing, and whom eventually developed language.

Donald's theory of the evolution of the human mind with mimesis at the core of things is very dependent on a lineage that is highly period-based, likely as a means to help explain some of the contradictory gaps in the archaeological record, where tool use, cultural artifacts, mastery of fire, and brain size (based on skulls that have been found) seem to either conflict, or have missing steps in their development.

Donald sees this progression taking place in a very linear way. An episodic memory had to be in place before an intentional communication system of any capacity could be implemented. However, it seems highly unlikely that hominids went straight from the ability to remember and mentally manipulate certain events to the ability to speak; they would need to develop a concrete sense of personal intentionality, along with the capacity to communicate this intentional stance to others, and with the reciprocal action of understanding their intentional stance as well.

== Criticisms and addendums to the theory ==
It seems unlikely that the development of the mind occurred in such linear periods as Donald describes them; new evidence that has emerged since the publication of Donald's book, primarily the discovery of mirror neurons, has laid the groundwork for a potentially more fluid, less periodic theory of the evolution of the mind.

Mirror neurons are a class of cells that have been found in the brains of several species of monkey, as well as in humans. Small clusters of mirror neurons tend to fire when an individual performs a given intentional action; this, however, is not the unique part. What is unique to mirror neurons is that a few of them in a cluster will also fire when an individual watches a different individual performing an intentional action. In other words, these neurons are influencing your ability for social learning. Because the same neurons are firing both when you perform an action and when you watch someone else rehearse that same action, the mind has obtained a method by which it can link itself to conspecific minds in order to share knowledge and culture, and in order to judge the intentional stance of a potential friend or foe.

The existence of these neurons should likely trace their roots back closer to a common ancestor with modern primates, the only other species noted with mirror neurons, and some of the intentional and mimetic capabilities that Donald attributes to the evolution of the mimetic mind in Homo Erectus were likely around much earlier in some simplified form, perhaps as the foundation of the rigid social hierarchies that our primate cousins are known for.

Indeed, evidence exists that perhaps monkeys are even better at some aspects of the social cognition game than humans are. Colin Camerer, a behavioral economist at the California Institute of Technology, has conducted studies on monkeys using strategic games, where the outcomes can be quantitatively assessed against results from game theory, an applied branch of mathematics and economics which dictates rational choices and optimal outcomes, such as Nash Equilibriums, in games of strategy between two or more opponents. Amazingly, when pairs of chimps and pairs of humans were pitted against each other in a strategic pattern matching game, the outcomes for pairs of chimps clustered much more closely to the Nash Equilibrium and other mathematically-efficient outcomes than the outcomes for pairs of humans did.

Perhaps even more interesting is that when the researchers shifted the reward incentive more in favor of one party versus the other- and so also shifting where the efficient equilibrium points should fall- the chimps not only altered their behavior accordingly, they once again clustered more closely around the new mathematical equilibriums than human pairs did. Camerer posits that this is likely attributable to the importance of social hierarchy and role in chimpanzees, where the ability to strategize into a position of best outcome given the circumstance (or the chance to manipulate another chimpanzee's strategic mistake to maximize one's own gain) is an incredibly valuable skill.

This seems to be a probable explanation for the unlikely capability of monkeys to have such a finely attuned social sense that their behavior can be described by formal mathematical equilibriums; unfortunately, it does not bode well for Donald's theory of a period of mimetic mind and culture development during the Erectus period of Homo lineage. Chimps in these experiments have shown signs of intentionality, communicativity, reference, modeling of social structure, reciprocal mimetic games, and conformity and coordination, all tenets of mimetic minds and mimetic cultures in Donald's model, but all certainly having roots in ancestry from before Donald's proposed mimetic period. Additionally, the chimpanzees must have at least a crude form of mental representations: the chimpanzees shifting to a new equilibrium when reward incentives were altered seems to undoubtedly indicate that they are aware of themselves and another chimp in a mutually-interactive environment, in which an abstract activity leads to a variable reward, a degree of strategy that requires at least some basic information to be held in the mind and manipulated.

Furthermore, many of these capabilities formed the basis of the progression into unique-to-human features of the mind developing in Donald's model. For example, this mimetic behavior must be preceded first by an episodic memory capable of handling mental manipulations; the combination of this memory system with the acquisition and development of skills like intentionality and mimesis should then be sufficient with the proper pressures to allow for skills like tool-making, ritual dance, and pedagogy. And yet primates have evolved alongside us for millions of years without developing tools, dance, or any significant means of information transfer and teaching, despite certainly having an episodic memory, and presumably having some sort of social mirroring neurons that allowed them to develop such a complex social hierarchy, as well as display basic levels of intentionality, communicativity, and coordination.

Thus, the divergence of cognitive capacities between humans and lower hominids may not be due so much to mimetic culture as it is due to some mutation that increased that plasticity in our brains around the time of Homo Erectus, perhaps in part related to the mastery of fire during this period, which would have allowed for cooking and the ability to ingest enough quality nutrition to give our brains the resources to make its final push into its modern stage of development. This increase in plasticity would certainly be a mutation or upgrade supported by natural selection; a brain that can learn faster, more efficiently, and calibrate itself more properly to the needs of body and mind in the environment provides an absolutely massive leg-up on the competition. The mirror neuron system would be a logical system to derive primary benefit from an increase in plasticity under the conditions proposed. If this adaptation were indeed a result of the mastery of fire and the additional nutrition and food security brought about by cooking, changes in communal relations would be a logical co-requisite development, as fire promised warmth and security, and the invention of cooking would have provided an easier way of feeding larger groups.
