= Theory of mediation =

The theory of mediation, which is the principal referent of the research group of the Interdisciplinary Laboratory for Language Research (L.I.R.L.), is a theoretic model developed at Rennes (France) since the 1960s by Professor Jean Gagnepain, linguist and epistemologist. This model, whose principles Jean Gagnepain has methodically set forth in his three volume study On Meaning (Du Vouloir Dire), covers the whole field of the human sciences. One essential feature of the theory is that it seeks to find a kind of experimental verification of its theorems in the clinic of psychopathology. For this reason, the theory presents itself as a "clinical anthropology".

The theoretic model developed by Gagnepain and his research group at Rennes has inspired the work of professors and researchers in a number of European countries and in the United States in a wide variety of disciplinary fields, among them linguistics, literature, psychology, art history, archeology, psychoanalysis, theology. Its aim is deliberately trans-disciplinary - or, as Gagnepain humorously puts it, the theory of mediation cultivates "in-discipline".

== A theory of culture ==
This model, originally developed with respect to language, today takes for its object the entirety of what is called "the cultural", that is, the dimension that specifies human beings and distinguishes them from other living species. In other words, "the cultural" constitutes the specific order of reality in which only human beings participate. It is the cultural order that permits human beings, while remaining natural beings, to constantly transcend their natural being in abstracting themselves from it.

The theory of mediation understands the cultural order - more simply, culture - not as the totality of the essential works of a society, nor as the general state of a given civilization, but as the ensemble of properly human capacities which, absent pathological conditions, all human beings share regardless of their historical epoch or geographical setting. For the theory of mediation, culture and reason - the "rationality" which philosophers have discussed for centuries - are identical. The human sciences, understood as the theory of mediation understands them, take up in their own distinctive fashion the questions which philosophy has treated only speculatively.

== A clinical anthropology ==
Gagnepain's work shows, on the basis of what the clinic forces us to recognize, that human reason is diffracted. In other words, rationality in human beings has several different forms which the clinic requires us to dissociate. Reason is logical, to be sure, but it is equally and just as fundamentally technical, ethnical, and ethical. There is no hierarchy among these different "planes" or "levels" of rationality that constitute psychic life.

On each of these planes or levels, human being mediate their relations to the world and others (thus the term "mediation"). Unlike the other animals, human beings are not limited to what their immediate physiological capacities allow them to grasp. They can stand back from, or take a distance from, their natural insertion in the world and can elaborate those cultural mediations that are constitutive of a properly human reality.

In Kantian terms, it is a question of passing from a description of an already constituted reason to an explanation of a constituting reason. It is a question, therefore, of accounting for that in human beings which, without their knowing it, makes them capable of posing the world - and of posing it not only in one way, by knowing it, as the traditional analysis holds, but in four different ways on the basis of four different capacities.

To be sure, human beings manifest the world in and across the words they speak : with them, they designate the world and explain it to themselves. In so doing, they realize their logical capacity. Human beings also manifest the world in and across their tools : with them, they fabricate the world and, in doing so, they realize their technical capacity. Human beings likewise manifest the world in originating their histories and societies, realizations not of their logical or their technical capacities but of their ethnic capacity. Finally, human beings manifest the world in the norms and regulations to which they submit their desires. Here is it question of their ethical capacity.

The possible autonomisation of the four planes (or levels or modes) of our rationality is revealed by the clinic. Although "normally" the four modes of our rationality function together in such a way that it is hardly possible to distinguish them, pathologically it does become possible to distinguish them, as, for example, when one mode of rationality ceases to function in an afflicted person whereas the others continue to do so. Each plane of rationality has its specific pathology. The pathology specific to the logical plane is aphasia; the pathology specific to the technical plane is atechnia; the pathology specific to the ethnical plane is psychosis (and perversion); the pathology specific to the ethical plane is neurosis (and psychopathic conditions).

In other words, pathology dissociates what normally cannot be distinguished and puts into evidence processes otherwise unseen. In this way, as Freud recognized, pathology provides a veritable analysis, that is, a breakdown, of the human psyche. Gagnepain therefore makes it a methodological rule "to admit or to impute to a system only those dissociations that are pathologically verifiable."
