= Boston Guild for the Hard of Hearing =

The Boston Guild for the Hard of Hearing (BGHH) was founded in 1916 as the Speech Reader's Guild by Mildred Kennedy, Anna L. Staples, and Clara M. Ziegler, three teachers at the Mueller-Walle School of Lip Reading in Boston. Until its closure in 2003, the BGHH was the largest nonprofit organization in New England dedicated to serving the needs of people with hearing impairment. Although the BGHH closed, the Speech Audiology Department at Northeastern University continues the BGHH's mission to provide services to the hearing impaired.

Claire K. Kennedy served as Executive Director of BGHH for thirty years, beginning in 1951. Under her leadership the organization pioneered several innovative initiatives, including: a pilot project to recruit trainers to work with hearing impaired persons, televised lip reading instruction, use of mobile screening units to conduct mass screenings in community settings, aiding in the establishment of hearing conservation programs in industries with high noise levels, the Infrared Listening System, and development of a 40-hour volunteer-administered course to teach lip reading skills to senior citizens living in remote areas.

The records of the BGHH are housed at the Northeastern University Archive, which maintains a specific finding aid for the BGHH collection.

== Purpose ==
According to the research conducted by the BGHH organization, three to five percent of public school children have incipient deafness. Thousands of children have not yet been discovered to have the disability. The research represents a condition which is left uncared for and neglected, resulting in a large percentage of deafened adults destined to become more or less of a burden to the community – a serious economic problem.

== Objectives ==
The Boston Guild For the Hard of Hearing worked to achieve the following objectives. The organization strived to establish and maintain a fellowship among the hard of hearing by providing a centre where all problems pertaining to deafness could be discussed. The guild also worked to supply a means by which such problems could be solved. Another objective involved the guild's work for the prevention of deafness and the conservation of hearing. Furthermore, the organization raised awareness of the disability by acquainting the public with problems relating to deafness.

To gain membership qualification into the guild the individual had to satisfy the following requisites. Any adult person who has not been deaf from birth or who did not become deaf before the acquisition of speech and language may apply for membership. Membership was divided into three classes: regular, associate and honorary. Regular membership was given to persons whose hearing was not normal. Associate membership was provided for persons whose hearing was normal and who wanted to collaborate with the guild to help achieve the mission. Honorary membership was bestowed for persons elected by unanimous vote of the Board of Directors in recognition of distinguished service to the guild. To gain a certain class of membership required candidates to go through the process as Election of members, individuals who desired to join the guild.

== Northeastern University Initiative ==
Northeastern University continues the Guild's mission of providing high quality services to the hard-of-hearing individuals in the community. The university has founded an outreach program that is commuted to serving the needs of people with hearing loss. The program is also working to find innovative ways to disseminate information to professionals and others in order increase awareness of the disability and create conversation on the issue.

Hearing Instrument Outreach Program

Northeastern University's Bouve College of Heath Sciences created the Hearing Instrument Outreach Program in order to provide disabled individuals in the community with affordable new or refurbished hearing aids or Assistive Listening Devices. The program was put in place to facilitate the accessibility of affordable hearing aids. Furthermore, the program also strives to provide personal services and information to achieve realistic expectations and success with hearing aids For individuals to qualify for hearing aids they must satisfy the following requirements. Individuals must have hearing loss that may benefit from hearing aids and may not be eligible for hearing aids through their medical insurance or any state program. Individuals must submit and application form and obtain medical clearance from a hearing aid physician. Finally they must provide proof of financial need.

Services

Northeastern University provides services to aid individuals through the process of prescribing, utilizing and caring for their hearing aid. An initial hearing aid consultation is scheduled the in Speech-Language and Hearing Center at Northeastern. In this consultation professionals will discuss and an appropriate model for the individual in need and recommendations are given to suit the individual. The next step in the process involves ear impressions and ear molds. Furthermore, patients who do not have a current hearing test to present will complete one during their visit. The program provides guidance through a hearing aid orientation in which patients are shown how to utilize their aid. Patients receive a trial period of at least 30 days and follow-up visit throughout the lifespan use of the hearing aid.

Aural Rehabilitation and Speech reading Classes

Aural rehabilitation and speech reading classes provide patients with new skills and technological updates that will help them reduce the impact of their disability on their communication. A hearing aid alone is not enough to overcome the challenges of the disability the Northeastern classes provide patients with knowledge about the implications of hearing loss.

== Notes and references ==
Notes

Pugh, Eunice Acheson (22 October 1942). "The Work of the Boston Guild for the Hard of Hearing". New England Journal of Medicine. 227 (17): 624–626. doi:10.1056/nejm194210222271703.

Miller, Margo (October 13, 1980). "New Help for Hard of Hearing". Boston Globe.

Dial, Marie (May 23, 1998). "New England Hard of Hearing Patients". Boston Globe.

=== Bibliography ===
Rockow, Karen (2008), Working with Deaf, Late-Deafened and Hard of Hearing Patients (PDF), Allston, MA: DEAF Inc, archived from the original (PDF) on 2016-03-04
