= Rites of the Gods =

Book by Aubrey Burl

- The first edition cover of Rites of the Gods.
- Author: Aubrey Burl
- Language: English
- Subject: Archaeology; Religion
- Publisher: J.M. Dent & Sons Ltd
- Publication date: 1981
- Publication place: United Kingdom
- Media type: Print (hardcover)

Rites of the Gods is an archaeological study of religious belief and ritual practices across prehistoric Britain from the Old Stone Age through to the Iron Age. Written by the prominent English archaeologist and megalithic specialist Aubrey Burl, it was first published in 1981 by J.M. Dent & Sons Ltd.

Each chapter explores a different stage in British prehistory, beginning with the Old Stone Age, when the island was inhabited by hunter-gatherers who likely undertook rituals for use in "hunting magic".

== Background ==
Prior to the publication of Rites of the Gods, Burl had already published several books on the subject of prehistoric religion, such as The Stone Circles of the British Isles (1976), Prehistoric Avebury (1979) and Rings of Stone: The Prehistoric Stone Circles of Britain and Ireland (1980).

== Synopsis ==
"Archaeologists can tell from which mountain source a stone axe came, what minerals there are in a bronze bracelet, how old a dug-out canoe is. They can work out the probable cereal-yield from the fields of a Late Bronze Age farm. These are objective matters. But the language, laws, morals, religion of dead societies are different. They belong to the minds of man. Unless they were written down, and even then only if they were recorded accurately, we shall find it hard to recapture them."

— Aubrey Burl, 1981.

Chapter one, "Avenues to Antiquity, Blind Alleys and Dead Ends", provides an introduction to the study of prehistoric religion, and the associated problems that come with it. Noting that archaeological evidence has to be supplemented with ethnographic comparisons, proto-historical literature and the study of later folklore, Burl highlights a number of prominent archaeological sites found in Britain that can be used to shed light on ancient religious beliefs, such as Skara Brae, Esh's Barrow and Windmill Hill.

In the second chapter, entitled "The Birth of the Gods", Burl turns his attention to Palaeolithic (Old Stone Age) and Mesolithic (Middle Stone Age) Britain, the periods when the populace – both Neanderthals and Homo sapiens – lived as nomadic hunter-gatherers. Using evidence from across continental Europe to supplement the few finds from Britain, Burl notes that it was the period when humans began ritualistically burying their dead, citing examples like that of the Red Lady of Paviland, providing potential evidence for a belief in an afterlife. He furthermore argues that in this period, the people of Britain saw their landscape in an animistic sense, being inhabited by a multitude of spirits, and that there were various animal cults, in particular dedicated to fierce creatures such as the bear. Turning to look at examples of cave art from across Europe, he draws comparisons with the artworks of contemporary Indigenous Australians, believing that in Stone Age Europe they were used for "hunting magic".

Chapter three, "Good Lands and Bone-Houses", looks at ritual and religion in Early Neolithic (New Stone Age) Britain, discussing the arrival of agriculture and the radical social changes that farming led to. Arguing that religion still centred largely around ensuring fertility by propitiating spirits, Burl identifies "sexual carvings", such as the chalk phallus found at Maumbury Rings or the goddess figurine from Grimes Graves as evidence of this. He also argues that this period saw the development of an ancestor cult in Britain, resulting in the deposition of the dead in barrows, including the large long barrows such as Fussell's Lodge. Finally, he discusses the defleshing of corpses and the smashing of human bone, possibly in rites designed to allow a human's spirit to depart the dead body, and potential totemism in Early Neolithic Britain, exemplified in the burial of ox heads at certain ritual sites. These themes are continued in the fourth chapter, "Dead Bones for Living People", which looks at the development of megalithic tombs in Britain, illustrating the existence of a "cult of the ancestors". Discussing examples ranging from Wayland's Smithy to Newgrange and Belas Knap, Burl highlights how there were regional architectural styles across Britain and Ireland, although all served similar purposes in housing the bones of the dead. He then argues that as the population rose, these stone tombs became too small to house the growing number who were dying, leading to the introduction of wider open henges and causewayed enclosures for the burial of the deceased.

The fifth chapter, "Rings around the Moon", explores the monumental architecture of the Late Neolithic period in Britain, discussing the development of large earthworks known as henges, as well as the construction of the early wooden and stone circles, many of which contained celestial alignments. Proceeding to focus on the Late Neolithic society of Orkney, he discusses the village of Skara Brae and the various ceremonial monuments in the region, such as Maes Howe and Stenness, arguing for the existence of an ancestor cult and totemistic beliefs.

== Reception and recognition ==
=== Academic reviews ===
Rites of the Gods was reviewed by the archaeologist Richard Bradley in the Archaeological Review from Cambridge.
