= Ezra B. W. Zubrow =

American anthropologist

Ezra B.W. Zubrow (born January 14, 1945) is an American anthropologist. One of his areas of specialization is archaeology. He is director of the International Circumpolar Archaeological Project. Further areas of expertise include arctic anthropology, climate change, simulation models, and human ecology and demography. He is editor-in-chief of the Journal of World Anthropology, a post he has held since 1994.

He is president of the Buffalo Center Chapter of United University Professions as well as being a member of the statewide Executive Board. Zubrow is also a researcher on disabilities and an activist for human and civil rights, especially for people with disabilities.

Zubrow earned his BA from Harvard College and both an MA and a PhD from the University of Arizona. He has taught at a number of universities in the United States and Britain, including Stanford University. He joined the University of Buffalo faculty as an associate professor in 1977. During his stint at Buffalo, he has been a visiting scholar at various universities in Europe, Australia, and Asia. Zubrow, is currently a SUNY Distinguished Service Professor in the Department of Anthropology at the University of Buffalo. He is also a research scientist with the National Center for Geographic Information Analysis laboratory at the same institution.

== Selected publications ==
- Zubrow, Ezra B. W. 1974. Prehistoric Carrying Capacity, a Model.
- Allen, Kathleen M. S. & Ezra B. W. Zubrow 1990. Interpreting Space: GIS and Archaeology. Applications of Geographic Information Systems.
- Renfrew, Colin & Ezra B. W. Zubrow. 1994. The Ancient Mind: Elements of Cognitive Archaeology.
- Zubrow, Ezra B. W. 2015. Population, Contact, and Climate in the New Mexican Pueblos, 2nd Edition.
