= Kenneth L. Cooke =

American mathematician

Kenneth L. Cooke (August 13, 1925 – August 25, 2007) was an American mathematical biologist known for his contributions to the study of epidemics. He was the W. M. Keck Professor of Mathematics at Pomona College in Claremont, California.

== Early life and education ==
Cooke was born in Kansas City, Missouri, in 1925. He enrolled at Pomona College, graduating in 1947 after serving in the Navy as a radar and radio technician during World War II. He subsequently earned a doctorate in mathematics from Stanford University.

== Career ==
Cooke taught at Washington State University for seven years. He then joined the Pomona faculty in 1957 and remained at the college for the rest of his career. He was promoted to a named professorship in 1985.

His work on epidemics involved modeling parameters under which a disease will spread or die out. He studied HIV/AIDS and other contagious diseases. His work also involved delay differential equations.
