= Amino-acid racemase =

amino-acid racemase

Identifiers
- EC no.: 5.1.1.10
- CAS no.: 9068-61-5

Databases
- IntEnz: IntEnz view
- BRENDA: BRENDA entry
- ExPASy: NiceZyme view
- KEGG: KEGG entry
- MetaCyc: metabolic pathway
- PRIAM: profile
- PDB structures: RCSB PDB PDBe PDBsum
- Gene Ontology: AmiGO / QuickGO
Search
- PMC: articles
- PubMed: articles
- NCBI: proteins

In enzymology, an amino-acid racemase (EC 5.1.1.10) is an enzyme that catalyzes the chemical reaction

an L-amino acid $\rightleftharpoons$ a D-amino acid

Hence, this enzyme has one substrate, L-amino acid, and one product, D-amino acid.

This enzyme belongs to the family of isomerases, specifically those racemases and epimerases acting on amino acids and derivatives. The systematic name of this enzyme class is amino-acid racemase. This enzyme is also called L-amino acid racemase. This enzyme participates in 4 metabolic pathways: glycine, serine and threonine metabolism, cysteine metabolism, D-glutamine and D-glutamate metabolism, and D-arginine and D-ornithine metabolism. It employs one cofactor, pyridoxal phosphate.

== Structural studies ==
As of late 2007, 5 structures have been solved for this class of enzymes, with PDB accession codes 2FKP, 2GGG, 2GGH, 2GGI, and 2GGJ.
