= Erwin Segal =

American psychologist

Academic background
- Education: University of Maryland, College Park (BA); University of Minnesota (PhD)

Academic work
- Discipline: Psychology
- Sub-discipline: Cognitive psychology
- Institutions: University at Buffalo; State College of Iowa; Arlington State College

Erwin Segal is an American academic who an emeritus professor of psychology at the University at Buffalo.

== Education ==
Segal earned a Bachelor of Arts degree in psychology from the University of Maryland, College Park and a PhD in psychology from the University of Minnesota.

== Career ==
As a PhD student, Segal also worked as an instructor at the University of Minnesota. He later worked as an assistant professor at the State College of Iowa and Arlington State College. He joined SUNY Buffalo in 1967. He is best known for his book with Garvin McCain on the philosophy of science The Game of Science ISBN 0-534-09072-9 (5th ed, 1988). His recent research efforts have been in cognitive psychology, in particular narrative comprehension and problem solving, working in the Center for Cognitive Science at SUNY Buffalo.
