= Aubrey Burl =

British archaeologist (1926–2020)

Aubrey Burl FSA FSA Scot
- Born: 24 September 1926
- Died: 8 April 2020 (aged 93)

Academic work
- Discipline: Archaeology
- Notable works: Rites of the Gods

Harry Aubrey Woodruff Burl FSA FSA Scot (24 September 1926 – 8 April 2020) was a British archaeologist best known for his studies into megalithic monuments and the nature of prehistoric rituals associated with them. Before retirement, he was Principal Lecturer in Archaeology, Hull College, East Riding of Yorkshire. Burl received a volume edited in his honour. He was called by The New York Times, "the leading authority on British stone circles".

Burl's work, while considering the astronomical roles of many megalithic monuments, was cautious of embracing the more tenuous claims of archaeoastronomy. In Prehistoric Avebury Burl proposed that Circles and Henge monuments, far from being astronomical observatories for a class of "astronomer priests" were more likely used for ritualistic practices, connected with death and fertility rites, and ancestor worship, similar to practices observed in other agricultural cultures (in particular the rituals of Native North American Tribes such as the Algonquin and the Pawnee). Rituals would have been performed at key times of the year, such as the Spring Equinox and Summer Solstice, to ensure a successful harvest from the land.

His approach led him to question what he saw as the over-romanticised view that Stonehenge was built from bluestones hauled by hand from the Preseli Hills in south west Wales to Salisbury Plain. In his view, the stones had been left close to the site by earlier glaciers and then exploited by the monument's builders. Others have argued that the bluestones have been traced to only the Preseli Hills through their chemical signature and that they could not have come from elsewhere. Additionally, it has been claimed that there was no known glacier with a course linking the hills with Salisbury Plain or a glacier from anywhere that reached far enough south. On the other hand, research by earth scientists shows that glacier ice reached the Scilly Isles on at least one occasion, and that ice which passed through Pembrokeshire did cross the coasts of Somerset and Devon.

Burl died on 8 April 2020 at the age of 93.

== Publications ==
=== Major archeological books ===
- Burl, Aubrey. The Stone Circles of the British Isles. New Haven: Yale University Press, 1976. ISBN 978-0-300-01972-8
- Burl, Aubrey. Prehistoric Avebury. New Haven: Yale University Press, 1979. ISBN 978-0-300-02368-8
- Burl, Aubrey, and Edward Piper. Rings of Stone: The Prehistoric Stone Circles of Britain and Ireland. New Haven: Ticknor & Fields, 1980, ISBN 978-0-89919-000-6
- Burl, Aubrey, Megalithic Brittany. Thames and Hudson, 1985. ISBN 0-500-01364-0
- Burl, Aubrey, and Max Milligan. Circles of Stone. The Harvill Press, 1999. ISBN 1-86046-661-3.
- Burl, Aubrey. Rites of the Gods. London: J.M. Dent, 1981.
- Burl, Aubrey. The Stonehenge People / Aubrey Burl. London: J.M. Dent, 1987, ISBN 978-0-460-04485-1.
- Burl, Aubrey. Great Stone Circles: Fables, Fictions, Facts. New Haven: Yale University Press, 1999, ISBN 978-0-300-07689-9.
- Burl, Aubrey. The Stone Circles of Britain, Ireland, and Brittany. New Haven: Yale University Press, 2000, ISBN 978-0-300-08347-7.
- Burl, Aubrey. A Brief History of Stonehenge. London: Robinson, 2007. ISBN 978-1-84529-591-2
- Burl, Aubrey. Four-posters: Bronze Age stone circles of Western Europe. Oxford: British Archaeological Reports, 1988. ISBN 0860545806.
- Burl, Aubrey. From Carnac to Callanish. The Prehistoric Stone Rows and Avenues of Britain, Ireland and Brittany. New Haven: Yale University Press, 1993. ISBN 0-300-05575-7
- Burl, Aubrey. Stonehenge: A New History of the World's Greatest Stone Circle. London: Constable, 2006. ISBN 978-1-84119-964-1

=== Other books ===
- Burl, Aubrey. Danse Macabre: Franc̦ois Villon, Poetry, & Murder in Medieval France. Stroud, Gloucestershire: Sutton Pub, 2000.
- Burl, Aubrey. God's Heretics: The Albigensian Crusade. Stroud: Sutton, 2002. ISBN 978-0-7509-2572-3
  - Translated into Polish as Burl, Aubrey, and Dorota Strukowska. Heretycy: krucjata przeciw Albigensom. Wrocław: Wydawn. Dolnośląskie, 2003. ISBN 978-83-7384-075-1
- Burl, Aubrey, and Humphrey Clucas. Catullus: A Poet in the Rome of Julius Caesar. New York: Carroll & Graf, 2004
- Burl, Aubrey. Black Barty: Bartholomew Roberts and His Pirate Crew 1718–1723. Stroud: Sutton, 2006
- Burl, Aubrey. Courts of Love, Castles of Hate: Troubadours and Trobairitz in Southern France 1071-1321. Stroud: Sutton, 2008. ISBN 978-0-7509-4536-3
