= Lambros Malafouris =

British cognitive archaeologist

Lambros Malafouris is a Greek-British cognitive archaeologist who has pioneered the application of concepts from the philosophy of mind to the material record. He is Professor of Cognitive and Anthropological Archaeology at the University of Oxford. He is known for Material Engagement Theory, the idea that material objects in the archaeological record are part of the ancient human mind.

== Education ==
Malafouris completed his doctorate in archaeology in 2005 at the University of Cambridge under the supervision of Colin Renfrew.

== Research ==
Working with Renfrew, Malafouris developed an approach to the study of the human mind, past and present, known as Material Engagement Theory (MET). MET has three central tenets:

1. Cognition is extended and enacted because material forms are part of the mind and cognition is the interaction between brains, bodies, and material forms.
2. Materiality has agency because it is able to influence change in brains and behaviors.
3. Meaning (signification) emerges through the active engagement of material forms.

These tenets provide an archaeological framework that "offers a new way of understanding the nature of cognition itself" and establishes "the archaeological record as an integral part of the thinking process."

Important concepts developed by Malafouris include:

- metaplasticity, the idea that the plastic human mind “is embedded and inextricably enfolded within a plastic” material culture
- thinging, the idea that humans think with and through material things
- neuroarchaeology, an archaeology informed by neuroscience. Renfrew and Malafouris first suggested and thus coined the term.

In 2007, Malafouris, Renfrew, and Chris Frith co-hosted the first symposium on the origins and nature of human thought at the McDonald Institute for Archaeological Research, University of Cambridge. Between 2018 and 2020, Malafouris and Thomas G. Wynn co-hosted a collaboration between the University of Oxford and the University of Colorado, Colorado Springs to examine the archaeology of the Lower Paleolithic through MET; the results were published in the journal Adaptive Behavior in 2021.

== Honors ==
Malafouris was a Balzan Research Fellow in cognitive archaeology at the McDonald Institute for Archaeological Research, University of Cambridge, from 2005 to 2008.

== Selected works ==
=== Authored books ===
- Malafouris, Lambros (2013). How Things Shape the Mind: A Theory of Material Engagement. MIT Press. ISBN 9780262019194.
- Koukouti, Maria-Danae; Malafouris, Lambros (2020). An Anthropological Guide to the Art and Philosophy of Mirror Gazing. Bloomsbury Academic. ISBN 9781350202634.
- Malafouris, Lambros (2026). People Are STRANGE: Material Engagement and the Creation of Self-Consciousness. MIT Press. ISBN 9780262553902.

=== Edited volumes ===
- Malafouris, Lambros; Knappet, Carl, eds. (2008). Material Agency: Towards a Non-Anthropocentric Approach. Springer. ISBN 9780387747101.
- Renfrew, Colin; Frith, Chris; Malafouris, Lambros, eds. (2009). The Sapient Mind: Archaeology Meets Neuroscience. Oxford University Press. ISBN 9780199561995.
- Malafouris, Lambros; Renfrew, Colin, eds. (2010). The Cognitive Life of Things: Recasting the Boundaries of the Mind. McDonald Institute for Archaeological Research. ISBN 9781902937519.

=== Special journal issues ===
- Malafouris, Lambros; Renfrew, Colin, eds. (2008). "Steps to a 'Neuroarchaeology' of Mind". Cambridge Archaeological Journal. 18–19 (3).
- Malafouris, Lambros; Gosden, Chris; Overmann, Karenleigh A., eds. (2014). "Creativity, Cognition & Material Culture". Pragmatics and Cognition. 22 (1).
- Malafouris, Lambros, ed. (2019). "Mind and Material Engagement". Phenomenology and the Cognitive Sciences. 18 (1).
- Idhe, Don; Malafouris, Lambros, eds. (2019). "Homo faber Revisited: Postphenomenology and Material Engagement". Philosophy & Technology. 32 (2).
- Wynn, Thomas; Overmann, Karenleigh A.; Malafouris, Lambros, eds. (2021). "4E Cognition in the Lower Palaeolithic". Adaptive Behavior. 29 (2).

=== Articles ===
- Malafouris, Lambros (2008). "Beads for a Plastic Mind: The 'Blind Man's Stick' (BMS) Hypothesis and the Active Nature of Material Culture". Cambridge Archaeological Journal. 18 (3): 401–414. doi:10.1017/S0959774308000449. S2CID 162254380.
- Malafouris, Lambros (2008). "Between Brains, Bodies and Things: Tectonoetic Awareness and the Extended Self". Philosophical Transactions of the Royal Society of London. Series B, Biological Sciences. 363 (1499): 1993–2002. doi:10.1098/rstb.2008.0014. PMC 2606705. PMID 18292056.
- Malafouris, Lambros (2010). "Metaplasticity and the Human Becoming: Principles of Neuroarchaeology". Journal of Anthropological Sciences. 88 (4): 49–72. PMID 20834050.
- Malafouris, Lambros (2010). "The Brain-Artefact Interface (BAI): A Challenge for Archaeology and Cultural Neuroscience". Social Cognitive and Affective Neuroscience. 5 (2–3): 264–273. doi:10.1093/scan/nsp057. PMC 2894672. PMID 20123661.
- Malafouris, Lambros (2015). "Metaplasticity and the Primacy of Material Engagement". Time and Mind. 8 (4): 351–371. doi:10.1080/1751696X.2015.1111564. S2CID 146644104.
- Malafouris, Lambros (2019). "Mind and Material Engagement". Phenomenology and the Cognitive Sciences. 18 (1): 1–17. doi:10.1007/s11097-018-9606-7. PMC 6713400. PMID 31523220. S2CID 254945693.
- Malafouris, Lambros (2020). "Thinking as 'Thinging': Psychology with Things". Current Directions in Psychological Science. 29 (1): 3–8. doi:10.1177/0963721419873349. S2CID 204367315.
- Malafouris, Lambros (2021). "How Does Thinking Relate to Tool Making?". Adaptive Behavior. 29 (2): 107–121. doi:10.1177/1059712320950539. S2CID 225335967.
- Malafouris, Lambros (2021). "Mark Making and Human Becoming". Journal of Archaeological Method and Theory. 28 (1): 95–119. doi:10.1007/s10816-020-09504-4. PMC 7889684. PMID 33679120. S2CID 232099281.

=== Book chapters ===
- Malafouris, Lambros (2008). "At the Potter's Wheel: An Argument for Material Agency". In Knappett, Carl; Malafouris, Lambros (eds.). Material Agency: Towards a Non-anthropocentric Perspective. Springer. ISBN 9780387747101.
- Malafouris, Lambros (2009). "'Neuroarchaeology': Exploring the Links between Neural and Cultural Plasticity". In Chiao, Joan Y. (ed.). Cultural Neuroscience: Cultural Influences on Brain Function. Progress in Brain Research 178. Elsevier. ISBN 9780080952215.
- Malafouris, Lambros (2010). "Grasping the Concept of Number: How Did the Sapient Mind Move Beyond Approximation?". In Renfrew, Colin; Morley, Iain (eds.). The Archaeology of Measurement: Comprehending Heaven, Earth and Time in Ancient Societies. Cambridge University Press. ISBN 9780521119900.
- Malafouris, Lambros (2010). "Knapping Intentions and the Marks of the Mental". In Malafouris, Lambros; Renfrew, Colin (eds.). The Cognitive Life of Things: Recasting the Boundaries of the Mind. McDonald Institute for Archaeological Research. ISBN 9781902937519.
- Malafouris, Lambros (2012). "Linear B as Distributed Cognition: Excavating a Mind not Limited by the Skin". In Jensen, Helle Juel; Jessen, Mads D.; Johannsen, Niels (eds.). Excavating the Mind: Cross-sections through Culture, Cognition and Materiality. University of Aarhus. ISBN 9788779342170.
- Malafouris, Lambros (2016). "On Human Becoming and Incompleteness: A Material Engagement Approach to the Study of Embodiment in Evolution and Culture". In Etzelmüller, Gregor; Tewes, Christian (eds.). Embodiment in Evolution and Culture. Mohr Siebeck. ISBN 9783161549014.
- Malafouris, Lambros (2017). "Play and Ritual: Some Thoughts from a Material Culture-Perspective". In Renfrew, Colin; Morley, Iain; Boyd, Michael (eds.). Ritual, Play, and Belief in Evolution and Early Human Societies. Cambridge University Press. ISBN 9781107143562.
- Malafouris, Lambros (2018). "Bringing Things to Mind: 4Es and Material Engagement". In Newen, Albert; De Bruin, Leon; Gallagher, Shaun (eds.). The Oxford Handbook of 4E Cognition. Oxford University Press. ISBN 9780198735410.
- Malafouris, Lambros (2020). "Beyond Biology and Culture: Cross-disciplinary Reflections on the Universality and Diversity of the Human Mind". Balzan Papers. Vol. 3. Olschki Publications. ISBN 9788822267108.

== See also ==
- Neuroarchaeology – Archaeological sub-discipline
- Neuroesthetics – Neuroscientific approaches purposed under the scope of applied aesthetics
