= Frederick L. Coolidge =

American professor

Frederick L. Coolidge is an American professor of psychology known for his work in cognitive archaeology. He has taught at the University of Colorado, Colorado Springs since 1979, where he now holds the title Distinguished Professor. With Karenleigh A. Overmann, he currently co-directs the Center for Cognitive Archaeology at the University of Colorado, Colorado Springs. He also teaches for the Centre for Cognitive and Brain Sciences at the Indian Institute of Technology Gandhinagar, India.

== Education ==
Coolidge completed his doctorate in psychology in 1974 at the University of Florida, followed by a clinical internship (1974–1975) and postdoctoral fellowship (1975–1976) in clinical neuropsychology at Shands Teaching Hospital, University of Florida.

== Research ==
Often in collaboration with archaeologist Thomas G. Wynn, Coolidge has published more than 50+ articles and book chapters in cognitive archaeology. He has also published more than 140+ articles in psychological research, including personality assessment and behavior genetics. With his colleague Thomas Wynn, Coolidge developed the "Enhanced Working Memory Hypothesis", the idea that small but heritable changes in working memory and other executive functions were critical to human cognitive evolution. Coolidge and Wynn have also collaborated on Neandertal cognition, cognitive differences between Neandertals and contemporary Homo sapiens, technical cognition, and creativity. In 2008, Coolidge co-chaired the 139th Numbered Wenner-Gren Symposium with Wynn. Entitled "Working Memory: Beyond Language and Symbolism," the proceedings were published as a special issue of Current Anthropology. In 2011, he and Wynn established the Center for Cognitive Archaeology at the University of Colorado, Colorado Springs.

== Honors ==
- In 1987, 1992, and 2005, Coolidge was awarded Fulbright Fellowships for work in India.
- In 1990, Coolidge was designated as a University of Colorado Presidential Teaching Scholar.
- In 2005, Coolidge received the UCCS Letters, Arts and Sciences Annual Outstanding Research and Creative Works Award.
- In 2007, Coolidge received the UCCS Annual Faculty Award for Excellence in Research.
- In 2015, Coolidge was appointed senior visiting scholar at Keble College, University of Oxford.
- In 2020, Coolidge was appointed guest professor at the Indian Institute of Technology Gandhinagar, India.

== Enhanced Working Memory Hypothesis (EWMH) ==
The Enhanced Working Memory Hypothesis (EWMH) proposes that a small but heritable change in executive functioning may have been the reason why Homo sapiens persisted and flourished, while cousin species like the Neandertals went extinct. Executive functions are the higher-level cognitive skills used to control and coordinate other abilities and behaviors; they consist of the abilities to make decisions, plan, strategize, organize, inhibit behavior, and temporally sequence events. The EWMH was inspired, in part, by Coolidge’s reaction to an article by paleoanthropologist Ian Tattersall that had suggested the between-species difference related to language. From his work in behavior genetics, Coolidge understood the heritability of the executive functions and surmised that possible differences in the executive functioning of the two human species had perhaps enabled Homo sapiens to outcompete the Neandertals. He proposed the idea to his colleague, archaeologist Thomas Wynn, resulting in a collaboration to operationalize executive functions so they could be detected in the archaeological record, as for example, resourcing strategies like traps suggest the involvement of executive functions like planning and inhibition because they involve significant amounts of time between an action (building and setting a trap) and its reward (harvesting prey). Coolidge and Wynn have focused in particular on the executive function Working Memory, expanding on the classic model by psychologist Alan Baddeley and examining signs of change in Working Memory in the archaeological record and its effects in domains like technical cognition and creativity.

== Personality and neuropsychological psychological tests ==
In the field of clinical psychology, Coolidge and various colleagues have developed and fielded six psychometric tests based on criteria in the Diagnostic and Statistical Manual of Mental Disorders of the American Psychiatric Association. These tests are widely used by mental health professionals and clinical researchers to diagnose personality disorders and neuropsychological traits in adults, adolescents, and children.

- The Coolidge Axis II Inventory (CATI) is a 260-item assessment measure designed to assess psychological and neuropsychological traits in adolescents and adults 15 years and older.
- The Coolidge Axis II Inventory-Short Version (SCATI) is a 70-item version of the CATI that measures 14 personality disorders.
- The Coolidge Correctional Inventory (CCI) is a 260-item self-report test designed for the diagnosis and treatment of jail and prison inmates.
- The Horney-Coolidge Type Indicator (HCTI) is a 57-item personality test designed to measure the three items (compliance, aggression, and detachment) in the tridimensional personality theory of psychoanalyst Karen Horney.
- The Coolidge Personality and Neuropsychological Inventory (CPNI) is a 200-item, parent-as-respondent inventory designed to assess children and adolescents between 5 and 17 years old.
- The Coolidge Autistic Symptom Survey (CASS) is an 84-item, parent-as-respondent inventory designed to assess the autistic spectrum disorder for children and adolescents 5–17 years old.

== Selected works in cognitive archaeology and cognitive evolution ==
=== Authored books ===
- Wynn, Thomas; Coolidge, Frederick L. (2012). How to Think like a Neandertal. Oxford University Press. ISBN 9780199742820.
- Coolidge, Frederick L.; Wynn, Thomas (2018). The Rise of Homo sapiens: The Evolution of Modern Thinking (2nd ed.). Oxford University Press. ISBN 9780190680916.
- Coolidge, Frederick L. (2020). Evolutionary Neuropsychology: An Introduction to the Evolution of the Structures and Functions of the Human Brain. Oxford University Press. ISBN 9780190940942.
- Wynn, Thomas; Coolidge, Frederick L. (2022). An Introduction to Evolutionary Cognitive Archaeology. Routledge. ISBN 9780367856953.

=== Edited volumes ===
- De Beaune, Sophie A.; Coolidge, Frederick L.; Wynn, Thomas, eds. (2009). Cognitive Archaeology and Human Evolution. Cambridge University Press. ISBN 9780521769778.
- Wynn, Thomas; Coolidge, Frederick L., eds. (2017). Cognitive Models in Palaeolithic Archaeology. Oxford University Press. ISBN 9780190204112.
- Overmann, Karenleigh A.; Coolidge, Frederick L., eds. (2019). Squeezing Minds from Stones: Cognitive Archaeology and the Evolution of the Human Mind. Oxford University Press. ISBN 9780190854614.
- Wynn, Thomas; Overmann, Karenleigh A.; Coolidge, Frederick L., eds. (2024). The Oxford Handbook of Cognitive Archaeology. Oxford University Press. ISBN 9780192895950.

=== Articles ===
- Coolidge, Frederick L.; Wynn, Thomas (2001). "Executive Functions of the Frontal Lobes and the Evolutionary Ascendancy of Homo sapiens". Cambridge Archaeological Journal. 11 (3): 255–260. doi:10.1017/S0959774301000142.
- Coolidge, Frederick L.; Wynn, Thomas (2004). "A Cognitive and Neuropsychological Perspective on the Châtelperronian". Journal of Anthropological Research. 60 (1): 55–73. doi:10.1086/jar.60.1.3631008. S2CID 163637931.
- Coolidge, Frederick L.; Wynn, Thomas (2005). "Working Memory, Its Executive Functions, and the Emergence of Modern Thinking". Cambridge Archaeological Journal. 15 (1): 5–26. doi:10.1017/S0959774305000016.
- Coolidge, Frederick L.; Wynn, Thomas (2007). "The Working Memory Account of Neandertal Cognition—How Phonological Storage Capacity May Be Related to Recursion and the Pragmatics of Modern Speech". Journal of Human Evolution. 52 (6): 707–710. doi:10.1016/j.jhevol.2007.01.003. PMID 17367843.
- Coolidge, Frederick L.; Wynn, Thomas (2011). "Commentary on Henshilwood and Dubreuil, The Still Bay and Howiesons Poort, 77–59 Ka: Symbolic Material Culture and the Evolution of the Mind during the African Middle Stone Age". Current Anthropology. 52 (3): 380–382.
- Coolidge, Frederick L. (2014). "Mind: The Brain's Leaky Organ". Brain. 137 (8): 2396–2398. doi:10.1093/brain/awu151. PMC 4610190.
- Coolidge, Frederick L.; Wynn, Thomas (2016). "An Introduction to Cognitive Archaeology". Current Directions in Psychological Science. 25 (6): 386–392. doi:10.1177/0963721416657085. S2CID 151889837.
- Coolidge, Frederick L. (2019). "The Ultimate Origins of Learning and Memory Systems". Human Evolution. 34: 21–38.
- Coolidge, Frederick L. (2021). "The Role of the Cerebellum in Creativity and Expert Stone Knapping". Adaptive Behavior. 29 (2): 217–229. doi:10.1177/1059712320966462. S2CID 226330299.

=== Book chapters ===
- Coolidge, Frederick L.; Wynn, Thomas (2012). "Cognitive Prerequisites for the Evolution of Indirect Speech". In Tallerman, Maggie; Gibson, Kathleen R. (eds.). The Oxford Handbook of Language Evolution. Oxford University Press. ISBN 9780199541119.
- Coolidge, Frederick L.; Wynn, Thomas; Overmann, Karenleigh A. (2012). "The Evolution of Working Memory". In Alloway, Tracy Packiam; Alloway, Ross G. (eds.). Working Memory: The Connected Intelligence. Psychology Press. ISBN 9781848726185.
- Coolidge, Frederick L.; Wynn, Thomas; Overmann, Karenleigh A. (2024). "The Expert Neandertal Mind and Brain, Revisited". In Wynn, Thomas; Overmann, Karenleigh A.; Coolidge, Frederick L. (eds.). The Oxford Handbook of Cognitive Archaeology. Oxford University Press. ISBN 9780192895950.

== Selected works in other topics ==
=== Authored books ===
- Coolidge, Frederick L. (2006). Dream Interpretation as a Psychotherapeutic Technique. Radcliffe. ISBN 9781846190179.
- Segal, Daniel L.; Coolidge, Frederick L.; Rosowsky, Erlene (2006). Personality Disorders and Older Adults: Diagnosis, Assessment, and Treatment. Wiley. ISBN 9780471649830.
- Coolidge, Frederick L. (2015). Memory Consolidation as Function of Sleep and the Circadian Rhythm (2nd ed.). Andesite Press. ISBN 9781296831158.
- Coolidge, Frederick L. (2021). Statistics: A Gentle Introduction (4th ed.). SAGE. ISBN 9781506368436.
- Coolidge, Frederick L. (2023). The Science of Dream Interpretation. Elsevier. ISBN 9780323884945.
- Wynn, Thomas; Coolidge, Frederick L. (2022). An Introduction to Evolutionary Cognitive Archaeology. Routledge. ISBN 9780367856953.

=== Personality and neuropsychological psychological tests ===
- Griego, Jacqueline; Stewart, Sharon E.; Coolidge, Frederick L. (1999). "A convergent validity study of Cloninger's Temperament and Character Inventory with the Coolidge Axis II Inventory". Journal of Personality Disorders. 13 (3): 256–267. doi:10.1521/pedi.1999.13.3.256.
- Coolidge, Frederick L.; Segal, Daniel L.; Cahill, Brian S.; Simenson, Jeremy T. (2010). "Psychometric properties of a brief inventory for the screening of personality disorders: The SCATI". Psychology and Psychotherapy: Theory, Research and Practice. 83 (4): 395–405. doi:10.1348/147608310X486363.
- Coolidge, Frederick L.; Segal, Daniel L.; Klebe, Kelli J.; Cahill, Brian S.; Whitcomb, Jamie M. (2009). "Psychometric properties of the Coolidge Correctional Inventory in a sample of 3,962 prison inmates". Behavioral Sciences & the Law. 27 (5): 713–726. doi:10.1002/bsl.896.
- Coolidge, Frederick L.; Moor, Candace J.; Yamazaki, Tomoko G.; Stewart, Sharon E.; Daniel L., Segal (2001). "On the relationship between Karen Horney's tripartite neurotic type theory and personality disorder features". Personality and Individual Differences. 30 (8): 1387–1400. doi:10.1016/S0191-8869(00)00120-3.
- Coolidge, Frederick L.; Thede, Linda L.; Stewart, Sharon E.; Segal, Daniel L. (2002). "The Coolidge Personality and Neuropsychological Inventory for Children (CPNI) Preliminary Psychometric Characteristics". Behavior Modification. 26 (4): 550–566. doi:10.1177/0145445502026004007.
- Schroeder, Rachel B.; Nolan, Sydney; Harris, Lani L.; Segal, Daniel L.; Coolidge, Frederick L. (2023). "On the differential diagnosis of autism spectrum disorder and attention-deficit/hyperactivity disorder". Psychiatry Research Communications. 3 (3): 1–5. doi:10.1016/j.psycom.2023.100135.

== See also ==
- Neuroarchaeology – Archaeological sub-discipline
