= Merlin Donald =

Canadian psychologist

Merlin Wilfred Donald (born November 17, 1939) is an emeritus Canadian professor of psychology, neuroanthropology, and cognitive neuroscience, at Case Western Reserve University, and in the Department of Psychology at Queen's University, Kingston, Ontario, Canada. He is noted for the position that evolutionary processes need to be considered in determining how the mind deals with symbolic information and language. In particular, he suggests that explicit, algorithmic processes (the computational theory of mind) may be inadequate to understanding how the mind works.

He is also known as the proponent of the mimetic theory of speech origins.

== Biography ==
He received his degrees in Canada, culminating in his Ph.D. in neuropsychology from McGill University in 1968. Following three years on the faculty of Yale School of Medicine, he joined the faculty of Queen's University at Kingston in 1972 and is still professor emeritus at Queen's. In the fall of 2005, Donald became the founding chair of the cognitive science department at Case Western Reserve University. He has since retired as the chair of that department and is currently an adjunct professor within the university. In the Spring of 2016, Donald was a fellow at the Swedish Collegium for Advanced Study in Uppsala, Sweden.

== Work ==
Merlin Donald is widely known as the author of two books on human cognition, Origins of the Modern Mind and A Mind So Rare.

His central thesis across these works is that the human capacity for symbolic thought arises not from the evolution of a language-specific mental module, but out of evolutionary changes to the prefrontal cortex affecting the executive function of the primate brain. The enhanced attentional, metacognitive, and retrieval capacities that resulted from these changes made hominids immensely more capable of dealing with social complexity than their ancestors. He concludes that what drove brain expansion was not the cognitive demands of toolmaking or spatial mapping of the environment, but the growth in the size of the social group, that imposed greater demands on memory.

In Donald's account, these changes amounted to the evolution of a completely novel cognitive strategy: a symbiosis between brain and culture. The human brain, he argues, is adapted to function expressly in a complex symbolic culture; it cannot realize its potential unless it is immersed in a complex network of communication and symbolic representation. This inextricable relationship between biology and culture also, he proposes, has interesting ramifications for the future of human cognitive development in light of the continuing development of technologies that support and change our relationship with symbolic thought and culture.

Origins of the Modern Mind proposes a three-stage development of human symbolic capacity through culture:

- Mimetic culture: The watershed adaptation allowing humans to function as symbolic and cultural beings was a revolutionary improvement in motor control, the "mimetic skill" required to rehearse and refine the body's movements in a voluntary and systematic way, to remember those rehearsals, and to reproduce them on command. Following this development, Homo erectus assimilated and reconceptualized events to create various prelinguistic symbolic traditions such as rituals, dance, and craft.
- Mythic cultures arose as a result of the acquisition of speech and the invention of symbols. Mimetic representation serves as a preadaptation to this development.
- Technology-supported culture: Finally, the cognitive ecology dominated by ephemeral face-to-face communication has changed for most of us as a result of the external memory-store that reading and writing permit. Computer technology intensifies these changes by offering even more extensive capacities for external storage and retrieval of information.

Donald suggests that the increasing reliance on external memory media in this third stage, which applies in varying degrees to most people in the developed world, may have profound effects on our cognitive development and behavior:

The externalization of memory was initially very gradual, with the invention of the first permanent external symbols. But then it accelerated, and the numbers of external prepresentational devices now available has altered how humans use their biologically given cognitive resources, what they can know, where that knowledge is stored, and what kinds of codes are needed to decipher what is stored.... When we study literate English-speaking adults living in a technologically advanced society, we are looking at a subtype that is not any more typical of the whole human species, than, say, the members of a hunter-gatherer group. What would our science look like if it had been based on a very different type of culture? The truth is, we don't know, but it would profit us greatly to find out, because the human cognitive system, down to the level of its internal modular organization, is affected not only by its genetic inheritance, but also by its own peculiar cultural history. (Donald 1997, pp. 362-363)

== Bibliography ==
- Origins of the Modern Mind: Three stages in the evolution of culture and cognition (Harvard, 1991) ISBN 0-674-64484-0.
- A Mind So Rare: The evolution of human consciousness (Norton, 2001) ISBN 0-393-32319-6.
- "The mind considered from a historical perspective: human cognitive phylogenesis and the possibility of continuing cognitive evolution." In D. Johnson & C. Ermeling (Eds.) The Future of the Cognitive Revolution, Oxford University Press, 1997, 478-492.
