= Jean Gagnepain =

French linguist and anthropologist

Jean Gagnepain (November 16, 1923 – January 3, 2006) was a French linguist and anthropologist.

== Biography ==
Jean Gagnepain was born on November 16, 1923, in Sully-sur-Loire (Loiret, France).

After obtaining an Agrégation in grammar, he carried on his study of language under the direction of Joseph Vendryes. He went to Dublin for about ten years to study celtic languages and concluded his stay in Ireland by defending a PhD thesis, in 1957, at the Faculty of Letters of the University of Paris, on the syntax of the verbal noun in celtic languages. His complementary thesis (necessary in France until 1968) was on the Greek nouns in -ΟΣ and -Α. In 1958, he was appointed as a professor at the University of Rennes where he stayed for the rest of his career (in the University of Rennes 2 after 1969, when the University of Rennes was divided between two universities). There, he met professor Olivier Sabouraud, a neurologist from the Faculty of Medicine, for a time chairman of the Department of Neurology of the University Hospital Rennes Pontchaillou. Together with Sabouraud, he began to study aphasia and other language disorders, which conducted him to develop a new theory of human rationality, he called theory of mediation (or clinical anthropology). His views on aphasia have given way to studies on grammatical impairment and even computer-software assessment and rehabilitation of brain-damaged patients. More recently, his theory of mediation has inspired new perspectives on apraxia and tool use.

He died on January 3, 2006, in Montpeyroux (Dordogne, France).

== Works ==
- "Aspect de la poésie médiévale", Bulletin de l'Association Guillaume Budé, n°2, p. 42-62, 1955.
- "Le monde de François Mauriac", Bulletin de l'Association Guillaume Budé, n°1, p. 133-158, 1956.
- Les noms grecs en -ΟΣ et en -Α. Contribution à l'étude du genre en indo-européen, Paris, Klincksieck, 1959.
- La syntaxe du nom verbal dans les langues celtiques, Paris, Klincksieck, 1963.
- "On language and communication", Language and Communication, Volume 1, Issues 2–3, Pages 149–154. DOI:10.1016/0271-5309(81)90009-4
- (with Hubert Guyard and Olivier Sabouraud), "A procedure to differentiate phonological disturbances in Broca's aphasia and Wernicke's aphasia", Brain and Language, Volume 13, Issue 1, May 1981, Pages 19–30. DOI:10.1016/0093-934X(81)90126-7
- Du vouloir dire : traité d'épistémologie des sciences humaines, vol. 1 : Du signe. De l'outil, Paris, Livre & Communication, 1990. ISBN 9782908740301
- Du vouloir dire : traité d'épistémologie des sciences humaines, vol. 2 : De la personne. De la norme, Paris, Livre & Communication, 1991. ISBN 2908740400
- Du récit au discours : propos sur l'histoire du droit, Bruxelles, De Boeck-Université, 1994. ISBN 2804119130
- Leçons d'introduction à la théorie de la médiation, Anthropo-logiques 5, Louvain-la-Neuve, Peeters, 1994. (Now available in PDF format)
- Pour une linguistique clinique (dir.), Rennes, Presses Universitaires de Rennes, 1994.
- Du Vouloir dire. Traité d'épistémologie des sciences humaines. Tome 3, Guérir l'homme. Former l'homme. Sauver l'homme, Bruxelles, De Boeck Université, 1995.
- Raison de plus ou raison de moins : propos de médecine et de théologie, Paris, Éditions du Cerf, 2005 ISBN 9782204076524
