= Neuroarchaeology =

Archaeological sub-discipline

Neuroarchaeology is a sub-discipline of archaeology that uses neuroscientific data to infer things about brain form and function in human cognitive evolution. The term was first suggested and thus coined by Colin Renfrew and Lambros Malafouris.

== Definition ==
As explained by archaeologist Dietrich Stout and evolutionary neuroscientist Erin E. Hecht, neuroarchaoelogy "has specific theoretical implications that extend beyond the general sense of the neologism. It is thus useful to distinguish between Neuroarchaeology (narrow sense) and neuroarchaeology (general sense). As outlined by Malafouris, Neuroarchaeology is an outgrowth of the cognitive-processual archaeology of Renfrew and is explicitly grounded in Material Engagement Theory. Material Engagement Theory focuses on the role of objects in mediating human behavior, cognition, and sociality and is closely aligned with approaches to cognition as extended, grounded, situated and distributed developed in psychology, philosophy, anthropology, and elsewhere. Neuroarchaeology explicitly aims to: (1) incorporate neuroscience findings into cognitive archaeology, (2) promote 'critical reflection on neuroscience’s claims on the basis of our current archaeological knowledge', and (3) facilitate cross-disciplinary dialog."

Neuroarchaeology combines the words "neuro-" as in "neuroscience," indicating its connection with the brain sciences, and "archaeology," meaning the study of human history and prehistory through excavation and other techniques designed to investigate the material record. The term has "archaeology" as its primary component, with "neuro-" used adjectivally; thus, it means an archaeology informed by neuroscience, or evolutionary cognitive archaeology. It denotes a relatively new research area investigating questions related to interactions between brain, body, and world over cultural and evolutionary spans of time.

== Significance ==
In the 21st century, significant gains in understanding the brain through the cognitive sciences opened up new areas of collaboration between archaeology and neuroscience. This has enabled archaeologists to base hypotheses about the biological and neural substrates of human cognitive abilities on archaeological data, especially change in material forms like stone tools across time. Neuroscientific insights can also be applied in critically reviewing and challenging theories and assumptions about the inception of modern human cognition and behavior, including whether there even are such things. Both neuroscience and neuroarchaeology seek to understand the human mind. However, the theories and methods of the two disciplines differ significantly. Neuroscience collects data on brain form and function in extant populations, while neuroarchaeolgy uses archaeological and neuroscientific data to examine change in brain form and function in extinct populations. To reconcile these theoretical and methodological differences, neuroarchaeology "aims at constructing an analytical bridge between brain and culture by putting material culture, embodiment, time and long term change at center stage in the study of mind."

Over the past several decades, neuroscientific data have been an essential component of neuroarchaeological analyses. The converse is less certain, as neuroscience has yet to make much use of archaeology's ability to furnish critical data on the timing and context of developments in human cognitive evolution, provide unique insight into what materiality does in human cognition, and negotiate temporalities of cognitive change that are difficult to assimilate into neuroscientific theories and methods.

Neuroarchaeology's interdisciplinary approach provides new opportunities for investigating the human mind and the role of material culture in human cognition and cognitive evolution. Specific focuses for neuroarchaeological research to date have included language, symbolic capacity, theory of mind, technical cognition, creativity, aesthetics, spatial cognition, numeracy, literacy, and causal understanding.

== See also ==
- Neuroscience
- Archaeology
- Cognition
- Cognitive neuroscience
- Evolution
