= John Gowlett =

John Anthony Jamys Gowlett, FBA, FSA, FRAI, is an archaeologist. Since 2000, he has been Professor of Archaeology and Evolutionary Anthropology at the University of Liverpool. He completed his doctorate at the University of Cambridge, which was awarded in 1979, before working as Senior Archaeologist to the Oxford Radiocarbon Accelerator from 1980 to 1987.

Gowlett studied handaxes at the Kilombe Archaeological site in Kenya for his PhD and continues to excavate there today. In the 1990s he ran excavations at the ~400,000 year old Acheulian site of Beeches Pit in Suffolk, also known for early evidence of fire use.

== Honours ==
In July 2017, Gowlett was elected a Fellow of the British Academy (FBA), the United Kingdom's national academy for the humanities and social sciences.

== Selected works ==
- "Human Evolution and the Archaeology of the Social Brain", Current Anthropology, vol. 53, no. 6 (2012), pp. 693–722.
- (Edited with R. I. M. Dunbar and C. S. Gamble) Lucy to Language: The Benchmark Papers (Oxford: Oxford University Press, 2014).
- (Edited with R. I. M. Dunbar and C. S. Gamble) Thinking Big: How the Evolution of Social Life shaped the Human Mind (London: Thames and Hudson, 2014).
- "Variability in an early hominin percussive tradition: the Acheulean versus cultural variation in modern chimpanzee artefacts", Philosophical Transactions of the Royal Society B—Biological Sciences, vol. 370, no. 1682 (2015).
- "The discovery of fire by humans: a long and convoluted process", Philosophical Transactions of the Royal Society B—Biological Sciences, vol. 371, no. 1696 (2016).
