= Embodied cognition =

Interdisciplinary theory

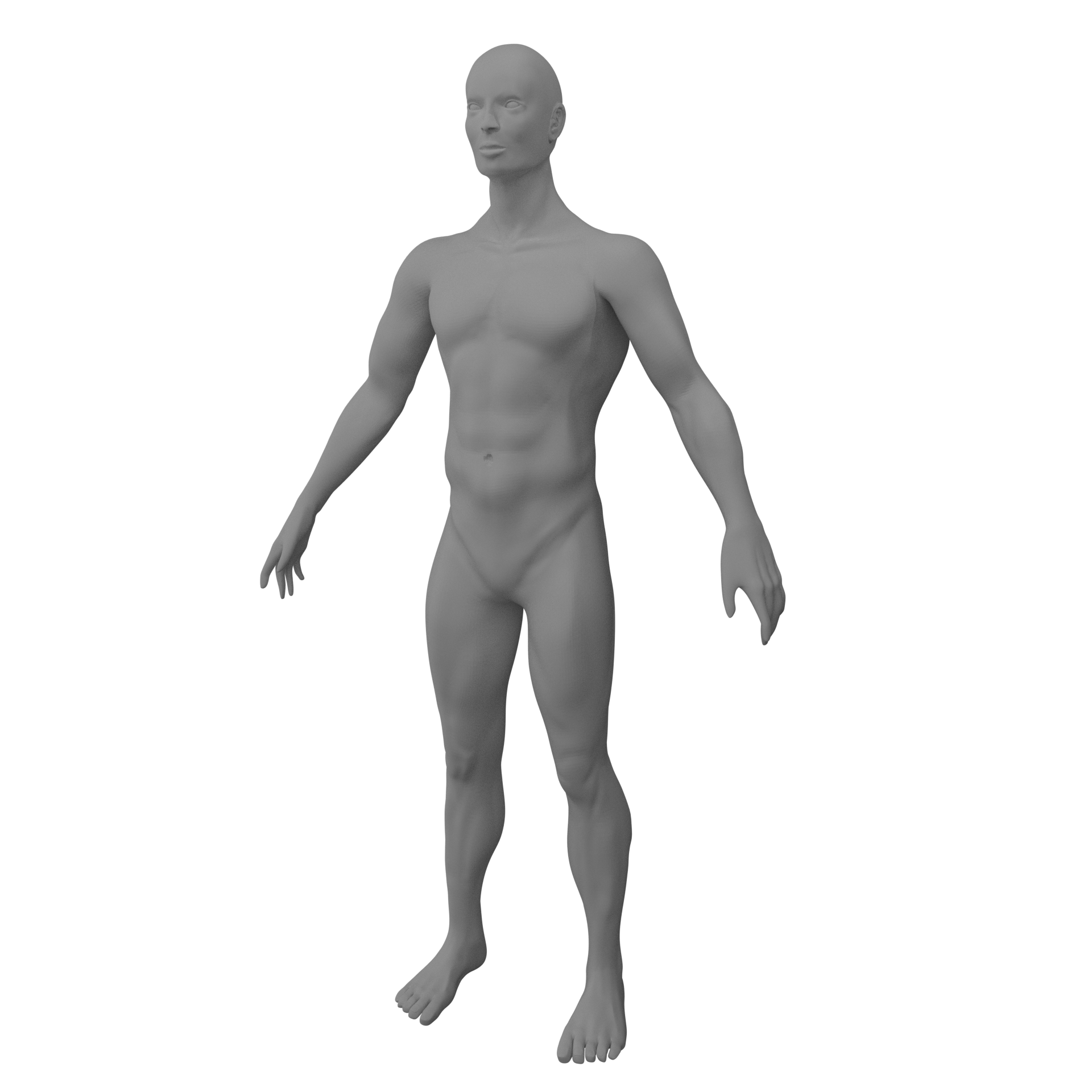

Details
- Theory of: Cognition
- Key concepts: Body; Mind; Environment; Affordance; Sensorimotor functions
- Origin: 20th century
- Cognitive features: Concepts; Categories; Perception; Language; Memory; Learning; Reasoning; Emotion; Self-regulation; Social cognition; Sensorimotor contingencies
- Bodily aspects: Motor system; Perceptual system; situatedness; Intrinsic assumptions

General
- Related fields: Cognitive science; Cognitive psychology; Cognitive neuroscience; Situated cognition; Philosophy; Linguistics; AI; Robotics
- Applications: Education; Robotics; Clinical settings; Sport; Music; Social psychology

Embodied cognition represents a diverse group of theories which investigate how cognition is shaped by the bodily state and capacities of the organism. These embodied factors include the motor system, the perceptual system, bodily interactions with the environment (situatedness), and the assumptions about the world that shape the functional structure of the brain and body of the organism. Embodied cognition suggests that these elements are essential to a wide spectrum of cognitive functions, such as perception biases, memory recall, comprehension and high-level mental constructs (such as meaning attribution and categories) and performance on various cognitive tasks (reasoning or judgment).

The embodied mind thesis challenges other theories, such as cognitivism, computationalism, and Cartesian dualism. It is closely related to the extended mind thesis, situated cognition, and enactivism. The modern version depends on understandings drawn from up-to-date research in psychology, linguistics, cognitive science, dynamical systems, artificial intelligence, robotics, animal cognition, plant cognition, and neurobiology.

== Theory ==
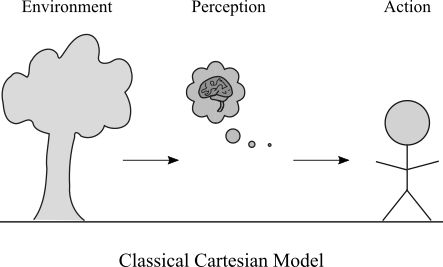
The classical Cartesian model of the mind under which body, world, perception and action are understood as independent

Proponents of the embodied cognition thesis emphasize the active and significant role the body plays in the shaping of cognition and in the understanding of an agent's mind and cognitive capacities. In philosophy, embodied cognition holds that an agent's cognition, rather than being the product of mere (innate) abstract representations of the world, is strongly influenced by aspects of an agent's body beyond the brain itself. An embodied model of cognition opposes the disembodied Cartesian model, according to which all mental phenomena are non-physical and, therefore, not influenced by the body. With this opposition the embodiment thesis intends to reintroduce an agent's bodily experiences into any account of cognition. It is a rather broad thesis and encompasses both weak and strong variants of embodiment. In an attempt to reconcile cognitive science with human experience, the enactive approach to cognition defines "embodiment" as follows:

By using the term embodied we mean to highlight two points: first that cognition depends upon the kinds of experience that come from having a body with various sensorimotor capacities, and second, that these individual sensorimotor capacities are themselves embedded in a more encompassing biological, psychological and cultural context.

— The Embodied Mind: Cognitive Science and Human Experience by Francisco J. Varela, Evan Thompson, and Eleanor Rosch, pages 172–173.

This double sense attributed to the embodiment thesis emphasizes the many aspects of cognition that researchers in different fields—such as philosophy, cognitive science, artificial intelligence, psychology, and neuroscience—are involved with. This general characterization of embodiment faces some difficulties: a consequence of this emphasis on the body, experience, culture, context, and the cognitive mechanisms of an agent in the world is that often distinct views and approaches to embodied cognition overlap. The theses of extended cognition and situated cognition, for example, are usually intertwined and not always carefully separated. And since each of the aspects of the embodiment thesis is endorsed to different degrees, embodied cognition should be better seen "as a research program rather than a well-defined unified theory".

Some authors explain the embodiment thesis by arguing that cognition depends on an agent's body and its interactions with a determined environment. From this perspective, cognition in real biological systems is not an end in itself; it is constrained by the system's goals and capacities. Such constraints do not mean cognition is set by adaptive behavior (or autopoiesis) alone, but instead that cognition requires "some kind of information processing... the transformation or communication of incoming information". The acquiring of such information involves the agent's "exploration and modification of the environment".

It would be a mistake, however, to suppose that cognition consists simply of building maximally accurate representations of input information...the gaining of knowledge is a stepping stone to achieving the more immediate goal of guiding behavior in response to the system's changing surroundings.

— Marcin Miłkowski, Explaining the Computational Mind, p. 4.

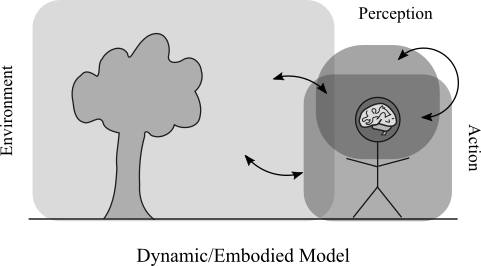
The embodied cognitive model of the mind under which body, world, perception and action are dynamically related with each other

Another approach to understanding embodied cognition comes from a narrower characterization of the embodiment thesis. The following narrower view of embodiment avoids any compromises to external sources other than the body and allows differentiating between embodied cognition, extended cognition, and situated cognition. Thus, the embodiment thesis can be specified as follows:

Many features of cognition are embodied in that they are deeply dependent upon characteristics of the physical body of an agent, such that the agent's beyond-the-brain body plays a significant causal role, or a physically constitutive role, in that agent's cognitive processing.

— RA Wilson and L Foglia, Embodied Cognition in the Stanford Encyclopedia of Philosophy.

This thesis points out the core idea that an agent's body plays a significant role in shaping different features of cognition, such as perception, attention, memory, reasoning—among others. Likewise, these features of cognition depend on the kind of body an agent has. The thesis omits direct mention of some aspects of the "more encompassing biological, psychological and cultural context" included in the enactive definition, making it possible to separate embodied cognition, extended cognition, and situated cognition.

In contrast to the embodiment thesis, the extended mind thesis limits cognitive processing neither to the brain nor even to the body, it extends it outward into the agent's world. Situated cognition emphasizes that this extension is not just a matter of including resources outside the head but stressing the role of probing and changing interactions with the agent's world. Cognition is situated in that it is inherently dependent upon the cultural and social contexts within which it takes place.

This conceptual reframing of cognition as an activity influenced by the body has had significant implications. For instance, the view of cognition inherited by most contemporary cognitive neuroscience is internalist in nature. An agent's behavior along with its capacity to maintain (accurate) representations of the surrounding environment were considered as the product of "powerful brains that can maintain the world models and devise plans". From this perspective, cognizing was conceived as something that an isolated brain did. In contrast, accepting the role the body plays during cognitive processes allows us to account for a more encompassing view of cognition. This shift in perspective within neuroscience suggests that successful behavior in real-world scenarios demands the integration of several sensorimotor and cognitive (as well as affective) capacities of an agent. Thus, cognition emerges in the relationship between an agent and the affordances provided by the environment rather than in the brain alone.

In 2002, a collection of positive characterizations summarizing what the embodiment thesis entails for cognition were offered. Professor of Cognitive Psychology Margaret Wilson argues that the general outlook of embodied cognition "displays an interesting co-variation of multiple observations and houses a number of different claims: (1) cognition is situated; (2) cognition is time-pressured; (3) we off-load cognitive work onto the environment; (4) the environment is part of the cognitive system; (5) cognition is for action; (6) offline cognition is bodily-based". According to Wilson, the first three and the fifth claim appear to be at least partially true, while the fourth claim is deeply problematic in that all things that have an impact on the elements of a system are not necessarily considered part of the system. The sixth claim has received the least attention in the literature on embodied cognition, yet it might be the most significant of the six claims as it shows how certain human cognitive capabilities, that previously were thought to be highly abstract, now appear to be leaning towards an embodied approach for their explanation. Wilson also describes at least five main (abstract) categories that combine both sensory and motor skills (or sensorimotor functions). The first three are working memory, episodic memory, and implicit memory; the fourth is mental imagery, and finally, the fifth concerns reasoning and problem solving.

== History ==
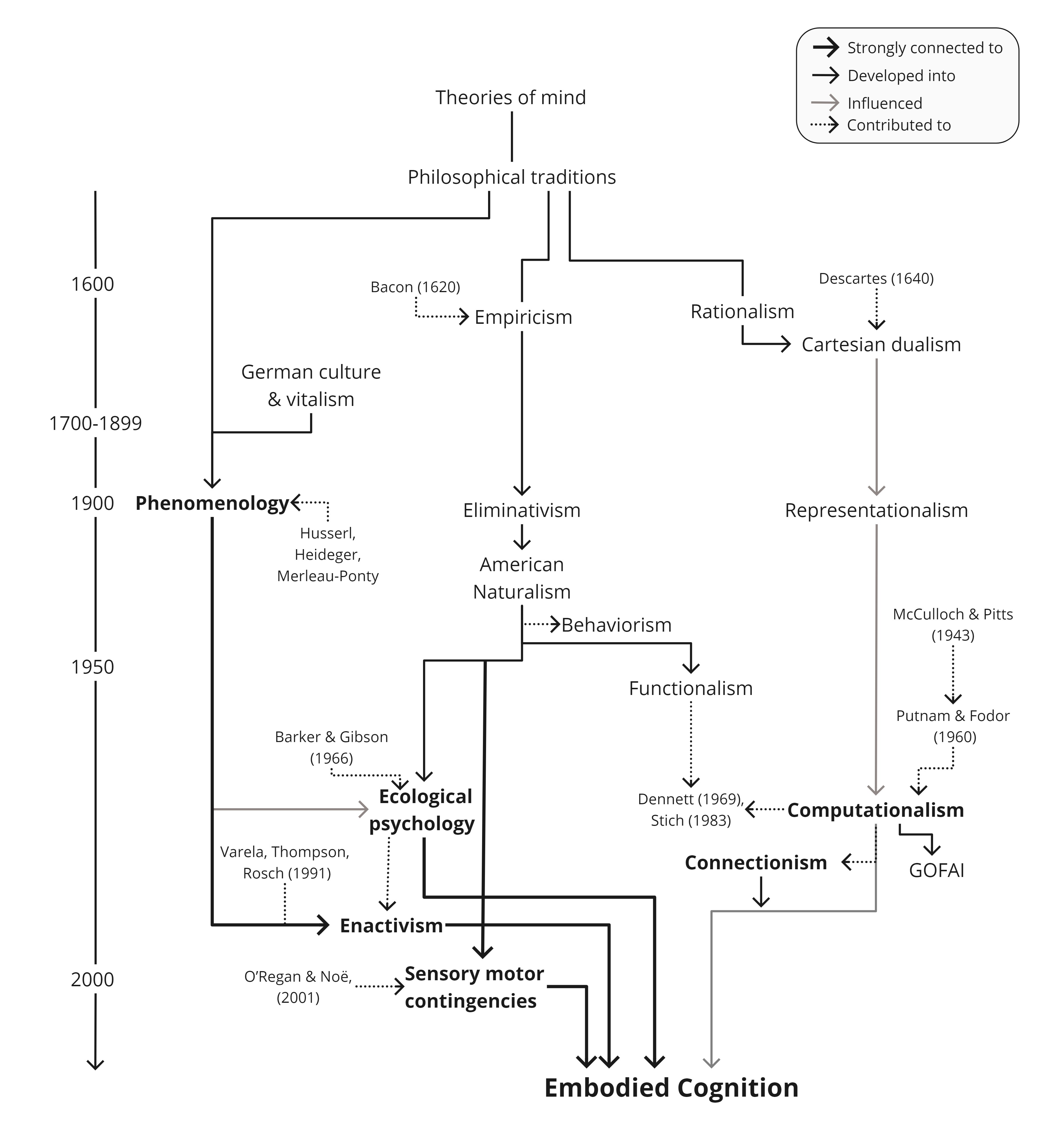
A timeline graph reconstructing historically relevant developments and key contributions that influenced the growth of embodied cognition. To the left are the years in descending order. The legend on the top-right corner indicates how to interpret the connections made.

The theory of embodied cognition, along with the multiple aspects it comprises, can be regarded as the imminent result of an intellectual skepticism towards the flourishment of the disembodied theory of mind put forth by René Descartes in the 17th century. According to Cartesian dualism, the mind is entirely distinct from the body and can be successfully explained and understood without reference to the body or to its processes.

Research has been done to identify the set of ideas that would establish what could be considered as the early stages of embodied cognition around inquiries regarding the mind–body–soul relation and vitalism in the German tradition from 1740 to 1920. The modern approach and definition of embodied cognition has a relatively short history. Intellectual underpinnings of embodied cognition can be traced back to the influence of philosophy and, more specifically, the phenomenological tradition, psychology, and connectionism in the 20th century.

Phenomenologists such as Edmund Husserl, Martin Heidegger and Maurice Merleau-Ponty served as a source of inspiration for what would later be known as the embodiment thesis. They stood up against the mechanistic and disembodied approach to the explanation of the mind by emphasizing the fact that there are aspects of human experiences (consciousness, cognition) that cannot simply be explained by a model of the mind as computation of inner symbols. From a phenomenological standpoint, such aspects remain unaccountable if, as in Cartesian dualism, they are not "deeply rooted in the physical nuts-and-bolts of the interacting agent". Maurice Merleau-Ponty in his Phenomenology of Perception (Note: French: "Phénoménologie de la perception"), for example, rejects the Cartesian idea that people's primary mode of being in the world is thinking (Note: English: "I think, therefore I am") (Note: Latin: "cogito ergo sum") and proposes corporeity (Note: French: "corporéité"), that is, the body itself as the primary site for knowing the world, and perception as the medium and the pre-reflective foundation of experience.

The body is the vehicle of being in the world, and having a body is, for a living creature, to be intervolved in a definite environment, to identify oneself with certain projects and be continually committed to them.

So stated, the body is the primary condition for experience since it comprises a collection of active meanings about the world and its objects. The body also provides the first-person perspective (a point of view) with which one experiences the world and opens up multiple possibilities for being.

Evidence from experiments and observations in research of how behaviour is constructed conducted in the 1920-30s by Nikolai Bernstein also brought his attention to the role of the body in cognition. Bernstein gave extensive example of how people change their own posture during perception of someone doing intense physical tasks.

The appreciation of the phenomenological mindset allows us to not overlook the influence that phenomenology's speculative but systematic reflection on the mind–body–world relation had in the growth and development of the core ideas which embodied cognition comprises. From a phenomenological perspective "all cognition is embodied, interactive, and embedded in dynamically changing environments". These constitute the set of beliefs which proponents of embodied cognition such as cognitive scientists Francisco Varela, Eleonor Rosch, and Evan Thompson will revise later on and seek to reintroduce in the scientific study of cognition under the name of enaction. Enactivism reclaims the importance of considering the biodynamics of the living organism to understand cognition by gathering ideas from fields such as biology, psychoanalysis, Buddhism, and phenomenology. According to this enactive approach, organisms obtain knowledge or develop their cognitive capacities through a perception–action relationship with a mutually determining environment.

This basic idea of (qualitative) experience as the product of an individual's active perception–action interactions with its surrounding is also traceable to the American contextualist or pragmatist tradition in works such as Art As Experience by American psychologist John Dewey. For Dewey, experiences affect people's personal lives as they are the by-product of continuous and commutative interactions of a biological and organic self (an incarnated body) with the world. These lived (corporeal) experiences should serve as the foundation to build upon.

On the bases of empirical grounds, and in opposition to those philosophical traditions that belittled the importance of the body to understand cognition, research on embodiment have demonstrated the relationship between cognition and bodily process. Thus, understanding cognition requires one to consider and investigate the sensory and motor mechanism that enables it. Cognitive scientist George Lakoff, for example, holds that reasoning and language arise from the nature of bodily experiences and, thus, even people's own metaphors have bodily references. Peter Putnam and Robert W. Fuller advanced a version of the computational theory of mind, perceptual control theory and neuroplasticity wherein rules become fixed in the brain's structure based on trial and error and motor neuron feedback loops.

Since the 1950s, encouraged by progress in informatics, researchers began to create digital models of the processes by which sensory input is selected by the brain, stored in the memory, connected to existing knowledge and used for elaboration. These traditional computationalists views of cognition that were typical in the 1950s–1980s are now considered implausible because there is no continuity with the cognitive skills that would have been demanded and developed by the ancestors of the human species. The earlier version of the concept of embodiment in cognition was offered in 1997-1999 by Irina Trofimova who called the experimentally proven effects of embodiment in meaning attribution as "projection through capacities". Some researchers indeed argue that this algorithmic focus on mental activities ignores the fact that human beings engage with evolutionary pressures using their entire bodies. Margaret Wilson considers the embodied cognition perspective as fundamentally an evolutionary one, viewing cognition as a set of abilities that built upon, and still reflects, the structure of physical bodies and how human brains evolved to manage those bodies. The theory of evolution emphasises that thanks to their bipedal gait, early humans did not need their 'forepaws' for locomotion, facilitating them to manipulate the environment with the aid of tools. One researcher goes even further, positing that the multiple opportunities provided by human hands shape people's concepts of the mind. One example is that people often conceive cognitive processes in manual terms, such as 'grasping an idea'.

J.J. Gibson (1904–1979) developed his theory on ecological psychology that entirely contradicted the computationalist idea of understanding the mind as information processing which by that time had permeated psychology—both in theory and practice. Gibson particularly disagreed with the way his contemporaries understood the nature of perception. Computationalist perspectives, for example, consider perceptual objects as an unreliable source of information upon which the mind must do some sort of inference. Gibson viewed perceptual processes as the product of the relation between a moving agent and its relationship with a specific environment. Similarly, Varela and colleagues argue that both cognition and the environment are not pre-given; instead, they are enacted or brought forth by the agent's history of sensorimotor and structurally coupled activities.

Connectionism also put forth a critique of computationalist commitments, while granting the possibility that some sort of non-symbolic computational processes might take place. According to the connectionist thesis, cognition as a biological phenomenon can be explained and understood through the interaction and dynamics of artificial neural networks (ANNs). Given the traces of abstraction that remain in the inputs and outputs through which connectionist neural networks carry computations, connectionism is said to be not so far from computationalism and unable to cope with both the challenge of dealing with the details involved during perceiving and acting and explaining higher level cognition. Likewise, connectionism's take on cognition is biologically inspired by the behavior and interaction of single neurons, yet its connections to the embodiment thesis in general, and to perception–action interactions in particular, are not clearly outlined or straightforward.

By early 2000, O'Regan, J. K. and Noë, A. provided empirical evidence against the computationalist mindset arguing that although cortical maps exist in the brain and their patterns of activation give rise to perceptual experiences, they alone are unable to fully explain the subjective character of experience. Namely, it is unclear how internal representations generate conscious perception. Given this ambiguity, O'Regan, J. K. and Nöe, A. put forth what would later be known as "sensorimotor contingencies" (SMCs) in an attempt to understand the changing character of sensations as actors act in the world. According to the SMC theory,

The experience of seeing occurs when the organism masters what we call the governing laws of sensorimotor contingency.

Ever since the late 20th century and recognizing the significant role the body plays for cognition, the embodied cognition theory has gained (an ever increasing) popularity, it has been the subject of multiple articles in different research areas, and the mainstream approach to what Shapiro and Spaulding call the "embodied make-over". A consequence of this widespread acceptance of the embodiment thesis is the emergence of 4E features of cognition (embodied, embedded, enacted, and extended cognition). Under 4E cognition it is no longer thought of as being instantiated in or by a single organism, rather:

It assumes that cognition is shaped and structured by dynamic interactions between the brain, body, and both the physical and social environments.

== Scope ==
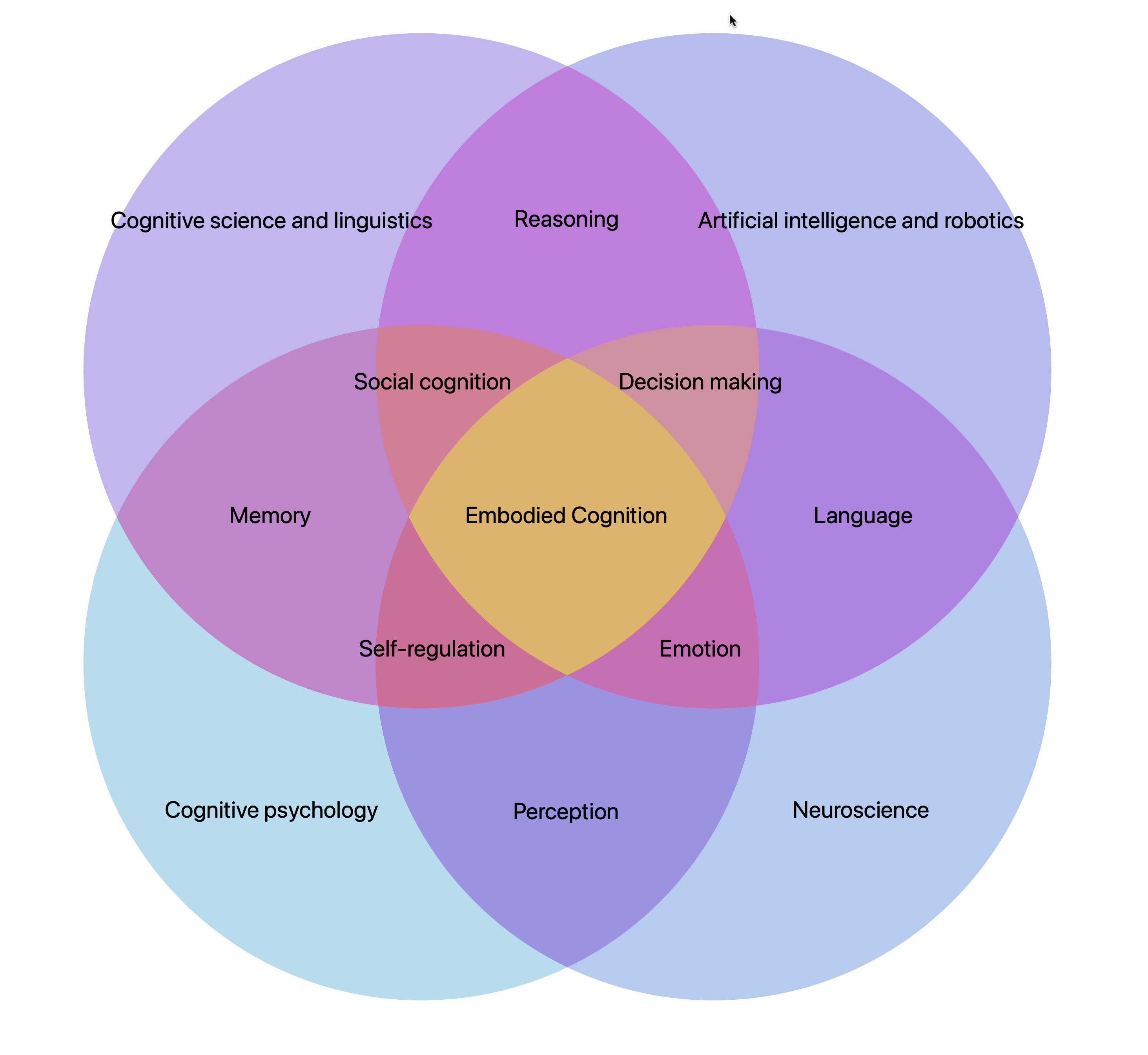
The scope of embodied cognition and the intertwined relationship that arise between the sciences

Embodied cognition argues that several factors both internal and external (such as the body and the environment) play a role in the development of an agent's cognitive capacities, just as mental constructs (such as thoughts and desires) are said to influence an agent's bodily actions. For this reason, embodied cognition is considered a wide-ranging research program, rather than a well-defined and unified theory. A scientific approach to embodied cognition reaches, inspires, and brings together ideas from several research areas, each with its own take on embodiment yet in a joint effort to (methodically) investigate embodied cognition.

Research on embodied cognition comprises a variety of fields within the sciences such as linguistics, neuroscience, (cognitive) psychology, philosophy, artificial intelligence, robotics, etc. For this reason, contemporary developments in embodied cognition can be regarded as the embodied make-over of cognitive science offering new ways to look at the nature, structure, and mechanisms of cognition. Embodying cognition requires the different features of cognition such as perception, language, memory, learning, reasoning, emotion, self-regulation, and its social aspects to be revisited and investigated through the lens of embodiment in order to ground its theoretical and methodological underpinnings.

Embodied cognition has gained the attention and interest of classical cognitive science (along with all sciences it comprises) to incorporate embodiment ideas into its research. In linguistics, George Lakoff (a cognitive scientist and linguist) and his collaborators Mark Johnson, Mark Turner, and Rafael E. Núñez have promoted and expanded the embodiment thesis based on developments within the field of cognitive science. Their research has provided evidence suggesting that people use their understanding of familiar physical objects, actions, and situations to understand other domains. All cognition is based on the knowledge that comes from the body and other disciplines are mapped onto humans' embodied knowledge using a combination of conceptual metaphor, image schema and prototypes.

The conceptual metaphors research have argued that people use metaphors all over to be in charge of the conceptual level; in other words, they map one conceptual state into another one. Therefore, research has stated that there is a single metaphor behind various definitions. Several examples of conceptual metaphors from different fields were collected to explain how metaphors relate to other metaphors and often refer to body aspects. The most common example given to this explanation is when people describe the concept of love, associating this love metaphor with physically embodied journey experiences. Another example of the language and embodiment of Lakoff and Mark Turner is visual metaphors. Accordingly, they argue that the positioning of these visual metaphors for upright and forward-moving creatures depends on body type and the characteristics of the body's interaction with the environment.

Another study from 2000 focused on the "image schema" to investigate how people understand abstract concepts. Accordingly, abstract concepts are understood by considering basic physical situations. Abstract concepts, whose basic physical states are considered, are then interpreted by using sensory-motor and perceptual skills. Thus, it is shown that there is a spatial reasoning process that requires using the body even in reasoning over abstract concepts. In this context, the image schema is seen as a conceptual metaphor form. For example, spatial reasoning skills and the visual cortex tend to be used to understand a mathematical concept consisting of imaginary numbers that are purely abstract. Thus, it has been shown how important the body plays in the image schema as in the conceptual metaphor in the interpretation of concepts.

Another important factor in understanding linguistic categories is prototypes. Eleanor Rosch argued that prototypes play an important role in people's cognition. According to her research, prototypes are the most typical members of a category, and she explains this with an example from birds. The robin, for example, is a prototypical bird while the penguin is not a prototypical bird which shows that objects that are prototypical are more easily categorized, and therefore, people can find answers by reasoning about the categories they encounter through these prototypes. Another study identified basic level categories that exemplify this situation in a more structured way. Accordingly, basic level categories are categories that can be associated with basic physical motions; they are made up of prototypes that can be easily visualized. These prototypes are used for reasoning about general categories. On the other hand, Lakoff emphasizes that what is important in prototype theory, rather than class or type characteristics, is that the feature of the categories people use is a bodily experience. Thus, as seen in the general of these approaches, it can be said that the most basic feature in understanding and interpreting linguistic concepts and categories is whether the concept or category has been experienced bodily.

Neuroscientists Gerald Edelman, António Damásio and others have outlined the connection between the body, individual structures in the brain and aspects of the mind such as consciousness, emotion, self-awareness and will. Biology has also inspired Gregory Bateson, Humberto Maturana, Francisco Varela, Eleanor Rosch and Evan Thompson to develop a closely related version of the idea, which they call enactivism. The motor theory of speech perception proposed by Alvin Liberman and colleagues at the Haskins Laboratories argues that the identification of words is embodied in perception of the bodily movements by which spoken words are made. In related work at Haskins, Paul Mermelstein, Philip Rubin, Louis Goldstein, and colleagues developed articulatory synthesis tools for computationally modeling the physiology and aeroacoustics of the vocal tract, demonstrating how cognition and perception of speech can be shaped by biological constraints. This was extended into the audio-visual domain by the "talking heads" approach of Eric Vatikiotis-Bateson, Rubin, and other colleagues.

The concept of embodiment has been inspired by research in cognitive neuroscience, such as the proposals of Gerald Edelman concerning how mathematical and computational models such as neuronal group selection and neural degeneracy result in emergent categorization. From a neuroscientific perspective, the embodied cognition theory examines the interaction of sensorimotor, cognitive, and affective neurological systems. The embodied mind thesis is compatible with some views of cognition promoted in neuropsychology, such as the theories of consciousness of Vilayanur S. Ramachandran, Gerald Edelman, and Antonio Damasio. It is also supported by a broad and ever-increasing collection of empirical studies within neuroscience. By examining brain activity with neuroimaging techniques, researchers have found indications of embodiment. In an Electroencephalography (EEG) study researchers showed that in line with the embodied cognition, sensorimotor contingency and common coding theses, sensory and motor processes in the brain are not sequentially separated, they are strongly coupled. Considering the interaction of the sensorimotor and cognitive system, a study from 2005 stresses how crucial sensorimotor cortices are for semantic comprehension of body–action terms and sentences. A functional magnetic resonance imaging (fMRI) study from 2004 showed that passively read action words, such as lick, pick or kick, led to a somatotopic neuronal activity in or adjacent to brain regions associated with actual movement of the respective body parts. Using transcranial magnetic stimulation (TMS), a study in 2005 stated that the activity of the motor system is coupled to auditory action-related sentences. When the participants listened to hand–or foot-related sentences, the motor evoked potentials (MEPs) recorded from the hand and foot muscles were reduced. These two exemplary studies indicate a relationship between cognitively understanding words referring to sensorimotor concepts and activation of sensorimotor cortices. Along the lines of embodiment, neuroimaging techniques serve to show interactions of the sensory and motor system.

Next to neuroimaging studies, behavioral studies also provides evidence supporting the embodied cognition theory. Abstract higher cognitive concepts such as the "importance" of an object or an issue also seem to stand in relation to the sensorimotor system. People estimate objects to be heavier when they are told that they are important or hold important information in contrast to unimportant information. Similarly, weight affects the way people invest physical and cognitive effort when dealing with concrete or abstract issues. For example, more importance is assigned to decision–making procedures when holding heavier clipboards. What this suggest is that the physical effort invested in concrete objects leads to more cognitive effort when dealing with abstract concepts.

The work of cognitive neuroscientists such as Francisco Varela and Walter Freeman seeks to explain embodied and situated cognition in terms of dynamical systems theory and neurophenomenology, rejecting the idea that the brain merely uses representations to cognise (a position also espoused by Gerhard Werner). There are several neuroscientific approaches to explain cognition from an embodied perspective as well as multiple methods such as neuroimaging techniques, behavioral experiments, and dynamical models that can be employed to support and further investigate embodied cognition.

In the field of Robotics researchers such as Rodney Brooks, Hans Moravec and Rolf Pfeifer have argued that true artificial intelligence can only be achieved by machines that have sensory and motor skills and are connected to the world through a body. The insights of these robotics researchers have in turn inspired philosophers like Andy Clark and Hendriks-Jansen.

In the light of these, a body is essential for cognition and, therefore, for intelligent behavior since the interaction between the body and the environment is fundamental for developing cognitive abilities. This type of knowledge is grounded in physical embodiment–the relationship humans have with their bodies. It is the concept of "the idea that the mind is not only connected to the body but that the body influences the mind". Embodied artificial intelligence and robotics is a method of applying this principle to artificial systems.

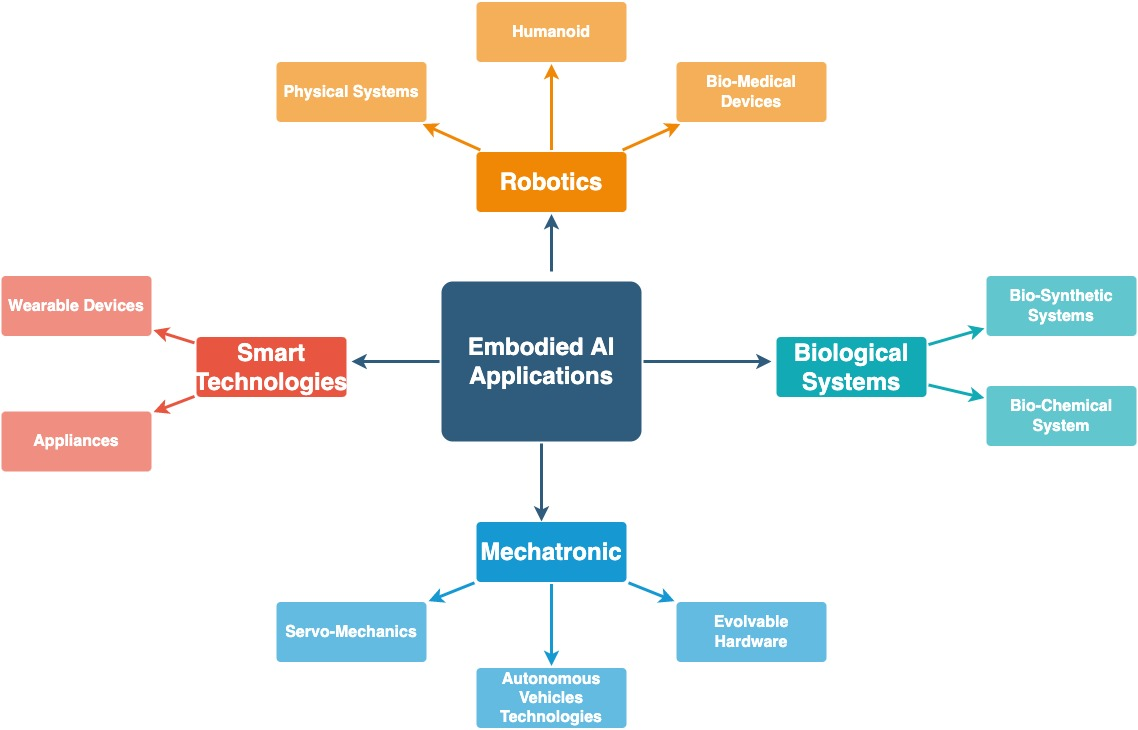
The applications of embodied cognition and artificial intelligence

Traditional artificial intelligence involves a computational approach. This primary computational paradigm evolved to the embodied perspective with embodied cognition studies and brought more interdisciplinary research topics to artificial intelligence. Embodied perspective brings a necessity of working with the physical world and systems which came alongside robotics. Robotics are essential for the embodied artificial perspective due to their differing capabilities from computers; computers define the inputs; robots can interact with the physical world via their own body. Researchers working on embodied AI are moving away from an algorithm-driven approach to robots interacting with the physical world. Embodied Artificial intelligence tries to figure out how biological systems work first, then construct basic rules of intelligent behavior, and finally apply that knowledge to create artificial systems, robots, or intelligent devices. Embodied artificial intelligence has a large scale of applications and research. For instance, the embodied artificial approach can be seen in micro- and nano-mechatronic systems and evolvable hardware, top-down bio-synthetic systems research, bottom-up chemo-synthetic systems, and biochemical systems. The majority of embodied artificial intelligence focuses on robot training and autonomous vehicle technologies. Autonomous vehicles have a significant interest in embodied artificial intelligence applications because this technology allows driving and making possible judgments based on what they see as humans do.

=== Perception ===
Example of the "change blindness" illusion. These two alternating images contain several differences that most people struggle to find right away. It emphasizes the fact that perception is active and demands attention.

Traditional neuropsychological research widely acknowledged that when an internal representation of the outside world is activated somewhere in the brain, it leads to a perceptual experience. Embodied cognition challenges this claim by stating that the existence of cortical maps in the brain fails to explain and account for the subjective character of people's perceptual experiences. For example, they cannot sufficiently explain the apparent stability of the visual world despite eye movements, the filling-in of the blind spot, or visual illusions such as "change blindness" which reveal apparent imperfections in the visual system. From an embodied cognition perspective, perception is not a passive reception of (incomplete) sensory inputs for which the brain must compensate to provide us with a coherent picture. The brain interprets the outside world based on an individual's intentions, memories, and emotions, as well as the environment and the specific situation the individual is in. Perception involves more complex processes than simply receiving inputs (or visual stimuli) from the external world to output actions in response to them. Perception is an active process conducted by a perceiving agent (a perceiver); it entails an engaged perceiver and is influenced by the agent's experiences and intentions, its bodily states, and the interaction between the agent's body and the environment around it.

One example of such active interaction between perception and the body is the case that distance perception can be influenced by bodily states. The way people view the outside world can differ depending on the physical resources that individuals have such as fitness, age, or glucose levels. For instance, in one study, people with chronic pain who are less capable of moving around perceived given distances as further than healthy people did. Another study shows that intended actions can affect processing in visual search, with more orientation errors for pointing than for grasping. Because orientation is important when grasping an object, the plan to grasp an object is thought to improve orientation accuracy. This shows how actions, the body's interaction with the environment, can contribute to the visual processing of task-relevant information.

Perception also influences the perspective individuals to take on a particular situation and the type of judgments they make. For instance, researchers have shown that people will significantly more likely take the perspective of another person (e.g., a person in a picture) instead of their own when making judgements about objects in a photograph. This means that the presence of people (as compared to only objects) in a visual scene affects the perspective a viewer takes when making judgements on, for example, relations between objects in the scene. Some researchers state that these results suggest a "disembodied" cognition given the fact that people take the perspective of others instead of their own and make judgments accordingly.

=== Language ===
Embodied cognition views on language describes how when humans comprehend words, sensorimotor areas are involved in interacting with the objects and entities the words refer to. First experimental studies of the impact of body's sex, age and constitution (temperament) on language perception and use emerged in 1995-99 and expanded from 2010s The embodiment effect initially was called "projection through capacities" and emerged as a tendency of people attribute meaning to common adjectives and abstract and neutral nouns depending on their endurance, tempo, plasticity, emotionality, sex or age. For example, in these studies males with stronger motor-physical endurance estimated abstractions describing people-, work/reality- and time-related concepts in more positive terms than males with a weaker endurance. Females with stronger social or physical endurance estimated social attractors in more positive terms than weaker females. Both male and female temperament groups with higher sociability showed a universal positive bias in their estimations of social concepts, in comparison to participants with lower sociability.

Over the last years, behavioral and neural evidence has shown that the process of language comprehension activates motor simulations and involves motor systems. Some researchers have investigated mirror neurons to illustrate the link between the mirror neuron systems and language suggesting that some aspects of language (such as part of semantics and phonology) can be embodied in the sensorimotor system represented by mirror neurons.

It is well known that language has a multi-component structure, one of which is language comprehension. Research on embodied cognition shows that language comprehension involves the motor system. In addition, various studies explain that understanding linguistic explanations of actions is based on a simulation of the action described. These action simulations also include evaluation of the motor system. A study in which university students evaluated language comprehension and motor system with a pendulum swinging task while performing a "sentence judgment task" found significant changes in functions containing performable sentences.

Another study used the mirror neurons perspective to illustrate the relationship between the motor system and several language components. Because mirror neurons are one of the essential parts of the motor system, researchers compared monkeys and humans in an anatomical framework; specifically, they made the comparison with respect to Broca's area. Another study concerning the role of mirror neurons during learning via language usage stated that activations occurred in Broca's area even when participants watched other people's conversations without hearing the sounds. An fMRI study examining the relationship of mirror neurons in humans with linguistic materials has shown that there are activations in the premotor cortex and Broca's area when reading or listening to sentences associated with actions. According to these findings, researchers state that there is a connection between the motor system and language. They also argue that the motor system together with mirror neurons mechanisms can process certain aspects of language.

As of 2014, literature mainly focuses on the relation between language and embodied cognition on a motor system, more precisely by mirror neuron explanations. This relationship also extends to cognitive capabilities which involve a variety of language components. Studies have examined how embodied and extended cognition can help to reconceptualize and ground second language acquisition. The nature of language acquisition extends cognitive capability itself due to the fact that it has multiple components which have embodied representations associated with language processing and provide a ground concept for language.

=== Memory ===
The body has an essential role in shaping the mind. So, the mind must be understood in the context of its relationship with a physical body that interacts in the world. These interactions can also be cognitive activities in everyday life, such as driving, chatting, and imagining the placement of items in a room. These cognitive activities are limited by memory capacity. The relationships between memory and embodied cognition have been demonstrated in studies in different fields and through various tasks. In general, studies on embodied cognition and memory investigate how manipulations on the body cause changes in memory performance, or vice versa, manipulations through memory tasks subsequently lead to bodily changes. Researchers have drawn attention to the relationship between memory and action from an embodied cognition approach where memory is defined as integrated patterns of actions limited by the body. On the one hand, embodied cognition sees action preparation as a fundamental function of cognition. On the other hand, memory plays a role in tasks that do not occur in the present but involve remembering actions and information from the past and imagining events that may or may not happen in the future. Glenberg blurs this apparent dichotomy by arguing that there is a reciprocal relationship between memory, action, and perception. Accordingly, manipulations that can take place in the body or movement can lead to changes in memory.

Researchers have also investigated the influence of body position on ease of recall in an autobiographical memory study to examine the effect of embodied cognition on memory performance. Participants were asked to take positions compatible or incompatible with their original body position of the remembered event during a recall event. Researchers found out that participants given compatible body positions compared to incompatible body positions showed faster responses in recalling memories during the experiment. Thus, they concluded that body position facilitates access to autobiographical memories. The relationship between memory and body has also emphasised that memory systems depend on the body's experiences with the world. This is particularly evident in episodic memory because this type of memories in the episodic memory system are defined by their content and are remembered as experienced by the person who is remembering. Research has also investigated the relationship between embodiment and memory by recalling collective and personal memories indicating how embodiment enriches the understanding of memory. Embodied memory research through the recalling of personal traumas and violent memories has reported that people who have experienced trauma or violence re-feel their experiences in their narratives throughout their lives. In addition, memories that threaten a person's life by directly affecting the body, such as injury and physical violence, recreate similar reactions again in the body while remembering the event. For example, people can report feeling smells, sounds, and movements when remembering childhood trauma memories. A proper evaluation of those memories and the corresponding physical and physiological phenomena associated with them could describe how those set of recalled memories are embodied.

New perspectives on the neural structure and memory processes underlying embodied cognition, episodic memory, recall, and recognition have also been explored. As experiences are received, neural states are reenacted in action, perception, and introspection systems. Perception includes sensory modalities; motor modalities include movement; and introspection includes emotional, mental, and motivational states. All of these modalities altogether constitute different aspects that shape experiences. Therefore, cognitive processes applied to memory support the action that is appropriate for a particular situation, not by remembering what the situation is, but by remembering the relationship of the action to that situation. For example, remembering and identifying the party one attended the previous day is said to be related to the body because the sensory-motor aspects of the event that is being recalled (i.e., the party), along with the details of what happened, are being reconstructed.

=== Learning ===
Research on embodied cognition and learning suggests that learning could occur and be triggered by perception-action interactions of the body with the surrounding environment. An embodied cognitive approach to child development provides insights into how infants attain spatial knowledge and develop spatial skills that allow them to (successfully) interact with the world around them. Most infants learn to walk in the first 18 months of life, which draws on ample new opportunities for exploring things around them. In this exploration, infants learn spatial relations, and by carrying objects from one place to another, they may also learn affordances such as "transportability". Thereafter, new phases in exploration may occur through which infants can discover other even more elaborate affordances. According to Eleanor Gibson, exploration takes an essential place in cognitive development. For example, infants explore whatever is in their vicinity by seeing, mouthing, or touching it before learning to reach objects nearby. Then, infants learn to crawl, which enables them to seek out objects beyond reaching distance, learn basic spatial relations between themselves, objects, and others, and get an understanding of depth and distance. This development of motor skills through the exploration of the physical and social world seems to play a central role in visual-spatial cognition.

Embodied perception-action experience may serve as a tool for learning that extends across the life span, from infancy to adulthood. Research on the role of action in early as well as educational learning contexts demonstrates the importance of embodiment for learning. In one experiment, three-month-old infants who were not skilled in reaching were trained to reach for objects with velcro-covered mittens instead. Afterward, the assessments and comparison with the control group showed that infants can rapidly form goal-based action representations and view others' actions as goal-directed. Further research indicates that mere observational experience by infants does not produce these results. Similarly, research has shown how action and bodily movements can be used as scaffolds for learning. A study investigating whether infants at high risk for developing autism spectrum disorders (ASD) could benefit from action scaffolded interventions (reaching experiences) during early development indicates an increase in grasping activity following training. And thus, it provides evidence about the possibility for high-risk of ASD infants to learn and respond to action-based treatment interventions. Another study investigates how teaching methods can benefit from embodiment and proposes that a professor's movements and gestures contribute to learning by growing students' embodied experiences in the classroom, leading to an increased capacity to recall.

The action-based language theory (ABL) states that aspects of embodiment are also relevant for language learning and acquisition. ABL proposes that the brain exploits the same mechanisms used in motor control for language learning. When adults, for example, call attention to an object and an infant follows the lead and attends to said object, canonical neurons are activated and affordances of an object become available to the infant. Simultaneously, hearing the articulation of the object's name leads to the activation of speech mirror mechanisms in infants. This chain of events allows for Hebbian learning of the meaning of verbal labels by linking the speech and action controllers, which get activated in this scenario.

The role of gestures in learning is another example of the importance of embodiment for cognition. Gestures can aid, facilitate and enhance learning performance, or compromise it when the gestures are restricted or meaningless to the content that is being transmitted. In a study using the Tower of Hanoi (TOH) puzzle, participants were divided into two groups. In the first part of the experiment, the smallest disks used in TOH were the lightest and could be moved using just one hand. For the second part, this was reversed for one group (switch group) so that the smallest disks were the heaviest, and participants needed both hands to move them. The disks remained the same for the other group (no-switch group). After the experiment ended, participants were asked to explain their solution while researchers monitored their gestures when describing their solution. The results showed that using gestures affected the performance of the switch group in the second part of the experiment. The more they used one-handed gestures to depict their solution in the first part of the experiment, the worse they performed in the second part.

A study investigating the role of gestures in second language learning states that learning the vocabulary with self-performed gestures increases learning outcomes. The enduring benefits continued even after two and six months post-learning. In addition, the same study also investigated the neural correlates of learning a second language with gestures. The results indicate that left premotor areas and the superior temporal sulcus (a brain region responsible for visual processing of biological motion) were activated during learning with gestures. Similarly, an fMRI study showed that children who learned to solve mathematical problems using a speech and gesture strategy were more likely to have activation in motor regions of the brain. The activation of motor regions occurred during scans in which children were not using gestures to solve the problems. These findings indicate that learning with gestures creates a neural trace of the motor system that goes beyond the learning phase and activates when children engage with problems they learned to solve with gestures.

Embodied cognition has also been linked to both reading and writing. Research shows that physical and perceptual engagements congruent with the content of the reading material can boost reading comprehension. Findings also suggest that the benefits accrued from handwriting as compared to typing in letter recognition and written communication result from the more embodied nature of handwriting.

=== Reasoning ===
Experiments investigating the relation between motor processes and high-level reasoning have suggested that bodily action and sensorimotor experience are linked to various aspects of reasoning. A study indicated that even though most individuals recruit visual processes when presented with spatial problems such as mental rotation tasks, motor experts (such as wrestlers) favor motor processes over visual encoding to manipulate the objects mentally, showing higher overall performance. Results indicate that motor experts' performance drops once the (hand) movement is inhibited. A related study showed that motor experts use similar processes for the mental rotation of body parts and polygons, whereas non-experts treated these stimuli differently. These results were not due to underlying confounds, as demonstrated by a training study that showed mental rotation improvements after a one-year motor training compared with controls. Similar patterns were also found in working memory tasks, with the ability to remember movements being significantly disrupted by a secondary verbal task in controls and by a motor task in motor experts, suggesting the involvement of different mechanisms to encode movements based on either verbal or on motor processes.

Demonstration of dynamic depictive gestures for the Triangle conjecture

The role of motor experience in reasoning has also been investigated through gestures. The Gesture as Simulated Action theory (GSA) provides a framework for understanding how gestures manifest their connection. According to GSA, gestures result from the embodied simulation of actions and sensorimotor states. Consequently, gesturing while expressing or reasoning ideas shows that embodied processes are involved in producing them. More significantly, gesturing heightens focus and increases activation of motor and perceptual information. Gestures are said to have a casual role in reasoning as gesturing leads to increased motor and perceptual information flow during the reasoning process. This does not necessarily translate into more effective reasoning, as such information is sometimes irrelevant for a specific problem. The effects of gestures on reasoning are not limited only to speakers; they convey information that also affects listeners' reasoning. For example, listeners could produce similar simulations to those of the speaker by attending to the speaker's gestures.

More evidence for the embodied role of gestures during reasoning comes from studies on mathematical and geometric reasoning. Studies indicate that gestures and, more particularly, dynamic depictive gestures (i.e., gestures used to represent and show the transformation of objects) are linked to better performance in snap judgment (intuition), insight, and mathematical reasoning for proof. Additionally, the use of dynamic depictive gestures are associated with better mathematical reasoning, and thus, directing learners to use such gestures facilitates justification and proof activities.

Embodied cognition theory has been applied in behavioral law and economics theory to enlighten reasoning and decision-making processes involving risk and time, decisions, and judgment. Research has shown that the idea that mental processes are grounded in bodily states is not being captured in the standard view of human rationality and the link between them could be useful for understanding and predicting human actions that seem irrational. The concept of "embodied rationality" results from expanding such ideas into law and highlights how findings stemming from embodied cognition offer a more encompassing insight into human behavior and rationality.

=== Emotion ===
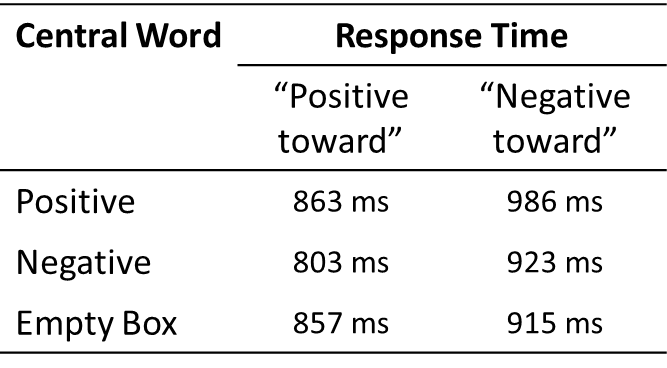
Response times for the positive, negative, and neutral valence conditions in the approach and avoidance experiment. Participants were significantly faster for the "positive toward" condition regardless of the central word's valence.

Embodied cognition theories have provided rigorous accounts of emotion and the processing of information about emotion. In this respect, experiencing and re-experiencing an emotion involve overlapping mental processes. Research has shown that one re-experiences emotion through the interconnections of the neurons that were active during the original experience. During the re-experience process, a partial multimodal reenactment of the experience is produced. One reason why only parts of the original neural populations are reactivated is that attention is selectively focused on certain aspects of the experience that are most salient and important for the individual.

The first theory of embodiment effect on emotions is known as James–Lange theory, after 19th century scientists William James and Carl Lange. They pointed out that physiological arousal to prior events generates a disposition to experience emotions, and so emotions are not just reactions to these events but are also reflections of dispositional body's states

Re-experience of emotion is produced in the originally implicated sensory-motor systems as if the individual were there, in the very situation, the very emotional state, or with the very object of thought. For example, the embodiment of anger might involve muscle tension used to strike, the enervation of certain facial muscles to frown, etc. Such simulation is backed by a specialized mirror neuron or a "mirror neuron system", which maps the correspondences between the observed and performed actions. A remaining issue is the lack of consensus about the exact location of the mirror neurons, whether they constitute a system, and whether there actually are mirror neurons.

Theories of embodiment propose that the processing of emotional states and the concepts used to refer to them are partly based on one's own perceptual, motor, and somatosensory systems. Research has shown, through manipulations of facial expressions and posture under controlled laboratory settings, how the embodiment of a person's emotion casually affects the way emotional information is processed. Similar studies have evidenced that nodding the head while listening to persuasive messages led to more positive attitudes toward the message than when shaking the head. When people are led to adopt certain bodily positions indirectly associated with different feelings such as fear, anger, and sadness, these corporeal postures are said to modulate the experienced affect. In a series of experiments on the neurobiological basis of language, researchers investigated the role of embodiment in emotional language through electromyographic (EMG) measurements of specific muscle regions. They found that action verbs that refer to positive emotional expressions (e.g., to smile) elicit smile muscle activation as compared to mere positive adjectives unrelated to actions (e.g., funny). Further research found that action verb stimuli also yield muscle activation and shape judgment only when muscle activation is not inhibited. Thus, these results suggest that language is embodied rather than symbolic.

Given the significant role emotions (e.g., fear and hope) play in an individual's life, research has been done linking embodiment, motivation, and behavior to investigate the intrinsic tendencies to act towards or away from a given stimulus. The approach and avoidance conflict (AAC) or approach and avoidance task (AAT) describes a natural behavioral bias to approach pleasant stimuli and avoid unpleasant ones (congruent response) faster than approaching unpleasant stimuli and avoiding pleasant ones (incongruent responses).

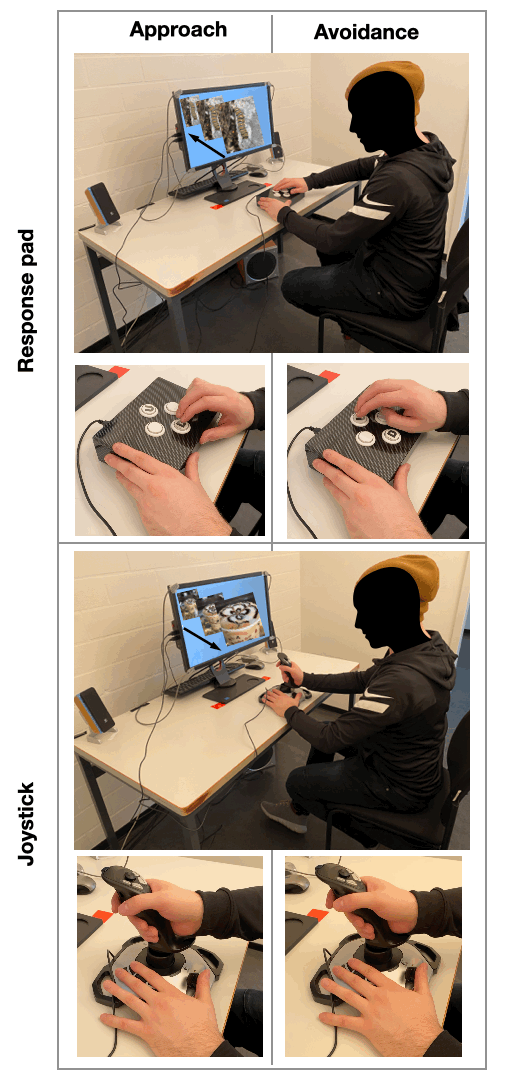
The approach and avoidance task. The top image depicts the zooming-out effect for avoidance and the bottom image the zooming-in effect for approach (as indicated by the arrows on the computer screen). The smaller images exemplify the approach and avoidance task performed by participants when using either the response pad or the joystick.

The approach-avoidance distinction is fundamental and basic to motivation, so much that it may be used as a conceptual lens through which to view the structure and function of self-regulation

The AAT has been investigated in different scenarios and with different types of stimuli such as words and images. A study focusing on the AAT on embodied cognition, for example, examined people's response to positive and negative words presented on the center of a screen by moving them away or towards the center. The study concludes that participants moved the given positive words towards the center of the screen while moving the negative words away from the center of the screen. In conformity with the AAT, participants showed an approach effect for positive words and avoidance effects for negative words. In a 2021 study on emotional or affective priming, the AAT was used to demonstrate the interaction between emotions and visual exploration. Pictures of news pages were presented on the computer screen and eye movements were measured. Researchers found out that the participants' harmonious bodily interaction during the emotional preparation process shows that their interest in the image's content displayed on the computer screen increased. These findings demonstrate the effect of emotional priming in the approach and avoidance behavior. A study on the behavioral aspects of the AAT suggests that there is an embodied component that is crucial to it. To investigate the role of gestures in AAT, participants were asked to react to positive and negative stimuli by either pressing a (far or near) button on a response pad; or by pushing forward or pulling backward a joystick. Researchers reported a significant response time advantage for the congruent responses when performed with the joystick and none when performed with the response pad. The fact that participants are faster at responding to the stimuli with the joystick seems to suggest the role of a crucial embodied component. In contrast to the response pad, the joystick couples more naturally with the body (hand) for the performance of the action and facilitates the gesture of approaching or avoiding positive or negative stimuli.

Evolutionary psychologists view emotion as an important self-regulatory aspect of embodied cognition, and emotion as a motivator towards goal-relevant action. Emotion helps drive adaptive behavior. The evolutionary perspective considers both spoken and written language as forms of embodied cognition. Pacing and non-verbal communication reflect embodied cognition in spoken language. Technical aspects of written language (such as italics, all caps, and emoticons) promote an inner voice and thereby a sense of feeling rather than thinking about a written message. At least some abstract words are said to be semantically grounded in emotional knowledge; they are "embodied". Whereas the meanings of the words "eye" and "grasp" can be explained to a degree, by pointing to objects and actions, those of "beauty" and "freedom" can not. Abstract terms show a strong tendency to be semantically linked to knowledge about emotions. In addition, abstract words strongly activate the anterior cingulate cortex, a site known to be relevant for emotion processing. Motor system activation for emotion-expressing body parts was found when adults processed abstract emotion words, indicating that, for one important class of abstract concepts, semantic grounding in emotion-expressing action can partly explain the meaning–symbol link.

=== Self-regulation ===
The basic idea underlying findings on embodied cognition is that cognition is composed of experiences that are multimodal and spread throughout the body, not in a way that amodal semantic nodes are stored purely in the mind. In line with this idea of embodied cognition, the body itself can also be involved in self-regulation.

Self-regulation can be defined as the capacity of organisms to successfully implement goal-consistent responses despite distracting or countervailing influences. Most people undergo a dilemma when they encounter immediate pains to gain long-term benefits. When facing this dilemma, the body can help augment willpower by evoking nonconscious willpower-strengthening goals that boost people's ongoing conscious attempts to facilitate their pursuit of long-term goals.

In a study, the effect of muscle-firming on donating money to Haiti was investigated. The participants either held the pen to fill out the donation sheet in their fingers ("control conditions") or in their hands ("muscle-firming" condition). Significantly, more participants of the "muscle-firming" group donated money than of the control group. One can therefore deduce that firming one's muscles can help to get over their physical aversion to viewing the devastation in Haiti and spending money. Similarly, physical or environmental cues signal the energetic costs of action and, subsequently, influence willingness to engage in additional volitional action. Studies have also shown that exposure to physical or conceptual thirst or dryness-related cues reduces perceived energy and, successively, decreases self-regulation. These studies suggest that embodied cognition can play a role in self-regulation.

Some suggest that the embodied mind serves self-regulatory processes by combining movement and cognition to reach a goal. Thus, the embodied mind has a facilitative effect. To navigate the social world, one must approach helpful resources such as friends and avoid dangers like foes. Facial expression can be a signal for evaluation of whether a person is desirable or dangerous. Embodied cognition can aid in clarifying others' emotions when emotional signals may be ambiguous. In a study, participants were able to identify expression shifts faster when they mimicked them in contrast to participants holding a pen in their mouths that froze their facial muscles, therefore, unable to mimic facial expressions. Other goal-relevant actions may be encouraged by embodied cognition, as evidenced by the automated approach and avoidance of certain environmental cues. Embodied cognition is also influenced by the situation. If one moves in a way previously associated with danger, the body may require a higher level of information processing than if the body moves in a way associated with a benign situation. The studies above may suggest that embodied cognition could serve a functional purpose by assisting in self-regulatory processes.

=== Social cognition ===
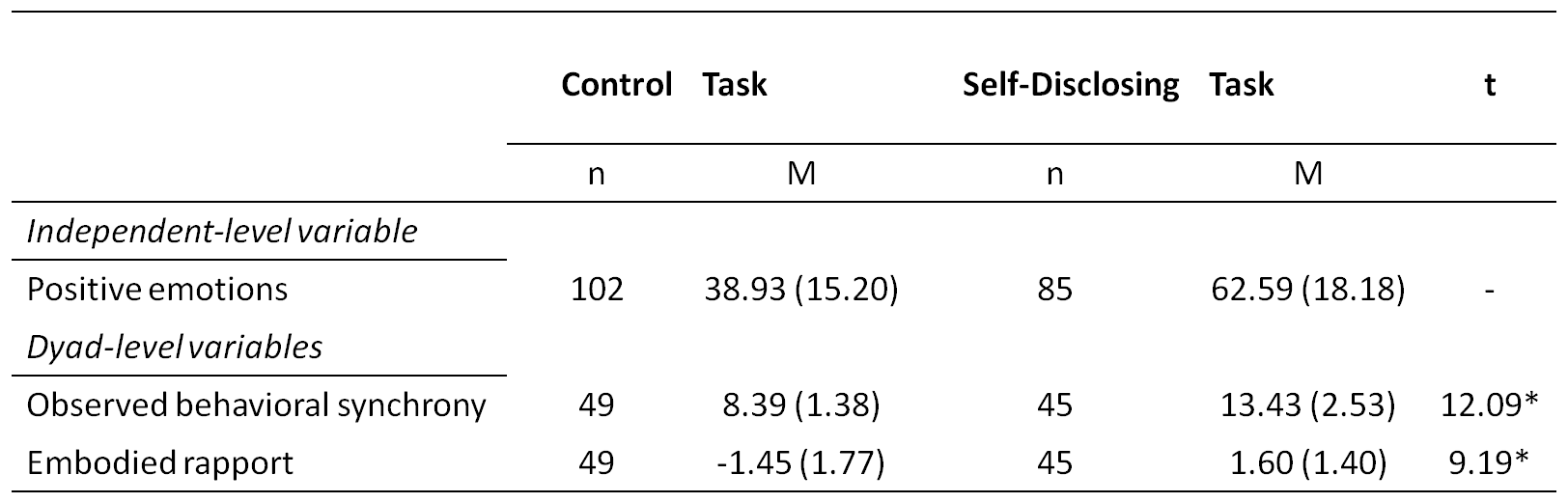
Results from a social embodied cognition study that illustrate the relationship between positive emotions, observed behavioral synchrony, and embodied rapport

In social psychology, and more specifically in social cognition, research focuses on how people interact and influence one another. In the context of embodiment, research in social cognition investigates how the presence of people and interactions between them affects each other's thoughts, feelings, and behavior. More precisely, social cognition proposes that thoughts, feelings, and behavior are grounded in sensorimotor experiences and bodily states.

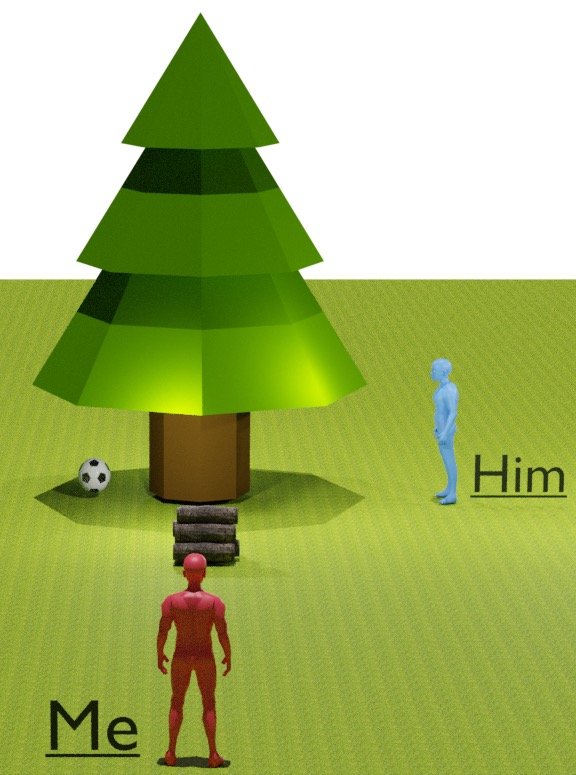
Visual Perspective Taking. VDP1: From his perspective, the ball is not visible. VDP2: The woodpile is on the left of the tree.

In the field of phenomenology, Merleau-Ponty's intercorporeity (Note: French: "intercorporéité") means that when meeting a person, one initially experiences the other person via their bodily expressions, which has an impact before cognitive reflections. This phenomenon is investigated in social psychology and is known as nonverbal synchrony. Synchrony during social interaction arises spontaneously and is often independent of conscious information processing.

In a dyadic social interaction study from 2014, same-sex participants interacted verbally in "cooperative", "competitive", and "fun task" conditions. The focus of this study was to investigate the connection between the participants' affectivity and nonverbal synchrony. Results showed that positive emotions were associated with positive synchrony while negative emotions were associated negatively. Other findings describe a causal relation between synchrony and emotions with synchrony leading to affect rather than vice versa. In a similar study, same-sex participant pairs were instructed to alternate asking certain questions and to progressively self-disclose. Results show that people spontaneously move together in space and synchronize their movement, enhancing the quality of interaction (embodied rapport). Self-disclosure and behavioral synchrony correlate with positive emotions towards another person. These two exemplary studies describe how nonverbal, behavioral synchrony of bodily movements influences the psychological experience of the interaction between people. These findings support the embodiment thesis idea of bodily experiences affecting people's psychological and emotional states.

One aspect of social cognition concerns perspective-taking, which consists in perceiving a situation from another person's point of view. Two categories of perspective-taking include visual and spatial perspective-taking. Visual perspective-taking (VPT) is defined as viewing a situation from another person's point of view and understanding how they see the world. Spatial perspective-taking (SPT) involves the ability to access what spatial information another viewer is perceiving, such as the orientation of objects in relation to each other. Accordingly, VPT has two different levels. VPT1 refers to understanding what is in someone else's point of view; VPT2 entails adopting this point of view and understanding how the world is represented from this point of view. Both levels are grounded and situated, yet it is only VPT2 that is embodied; it is only VPT2 that relies on deliberate movement simulation. In the case of SPT, research has shown that not only the presence of another person in the position of potential actions on objects leads to SPT in participants, but also phrasing the query in terms of actions increases the number of people who participate in SPT. The embodiment of SPT is also dependent on sex and social skills. Males and people with lower social skills are said to have lower levels of embodiment in SPT as compared to females and people with higher social skills.

Research suggests that aging affects social cognition and perspective-taking. In one study, four experiments evaluated implicit and explicit VPT as well as executive and social cognition measures in healthy young and older adults. Congruency effect (the detrimental effect of congruency of the alternative perspective on response time and accuracy) was detected in both egocentric and allocentric conditions in explicit VPT1 and VPT2. Incongruencies in VPT1 less influenced older adults. In VPT2, older adults showed a more significant congruency effect and influence of allocentric perspective during egocentric judgment. These results could explain the impairment of older adults in social tasks that rely on perspective-taking.

=== Sensorimotor contingencies ===
As a part of the embodied cognition theory, proponents suggest that an organism's sensory and the motor systems are dynamically integrated. This idea is known as sensorimotor coupling which allows sensory information to be efficiently used during action. Similarly, the concept of sensorimotor contingencies (SMCs) states that the quality of perception is determined by the knowledge of how sensory information changes when one acts in the world. As an example, to look underneath an object, one has to bend down, shift one's head, and change the gaze direction. Proponents of the SMCs theory argue that every stimulus modality / sensory modality such as light, sound pressure, etc. follow specific rules (i.e. sensorimotor contingencies) that govern those changes of sensory information. Consequentially, since those rules differ between modalities, also the qualitative experience of them differs. There are multiple examples that highlight the distinction between SMCs of different modalities. An instance of an SMC distinct for the visual percept is the expansion of the flow pattern on the retina when the body moves forward and the analogous contraction when the body moves backward. In contrast, auditory SMCs are affected by head rotations which change the temporal asynchrony of a received signal between the right and the left ear. This movement mainly affects the amplitude and not the frequency of the sensory input.

Support for the SMCs theory is brought forward by studies on sensory substitution and research on the field of robotics. Research on sensory substitution and sensory substitution devices investigates the replacement of one modality by another (e.g. visual information replaced by tactile information). The core idea is that sensorimotor contingencies of one modality are transmitted via another modality. Sensory augmentation aims for the perception of a new sense via already existing perceptual channels. In this case, sensory augmentation allows for new sensorimotor contingencies to be formed. In the field of robotics, researchers investigate, for example, how visual SMCs are learned on a neural level with the help of a robotic arm and dynamic neural fields.

== Applications ==
Over the past years, embodied cognition research has gradually redeemed the scientific study of bodily experiences and simultaneously laid a theoretical and empirical foundation across multiple disciplines. Principles and findings underlying embodied cognition have begun to be transferred and applied in several fields ranging from education, robotics, clinical settings, social psychology, sports, to music.

=== Education ===
Energy Theater: A learning activity for energy dynamics that relies on embodied cognition.

Embodied cognition findings have been translated into an overhaul of educational and teaching practices in favor of embodied learning and teaching methods. In particular, such embodied practices feature prominently in science education. For example, Energy Theater is a method for teaching about energy dynamics based on the embodied interaction theory. In this method, participants each play the role of a unit of energy, and together, they enact the transformation and transfer of energy in specific scenarios.

The Human Orrery is another embodied educational method in which students learn about the Solar System through enactment. In this method, the position of the planets is marked by disks, and the participants enact the role of the planets by moving on their orbits.

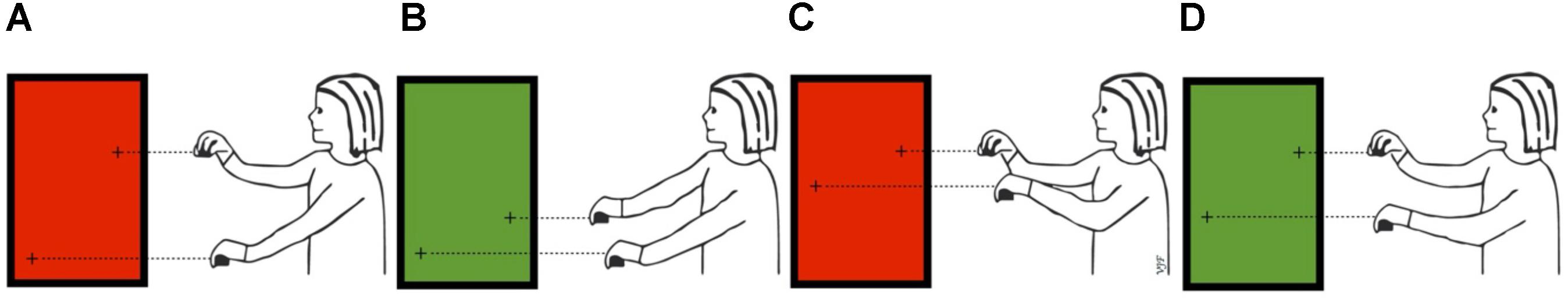
The Mathematics Imagery Trainer for Proportion. A tool to help students learn proportion.

In a survey from 2020, researchers analyzed several frameworks that bring embodied cognition theory into clever classroom practices for the teaching and learning of mathematics. The embodied design-based research program identifies and classifies at least two forms of embodied designs: perception and action-based designs. In perception-based designs, the target is a/b concepts such as likelihood, slope, and proportional equivalence in geometrical similitude. The first step in this design involves asking students to use their naïve worldview to judge a set of material presented to them by their teacher, which affirms their naïve worldview. Afterward, teachers provide students with appropriate media and attempt to guide them to build models by following the formal procedure. In action-based designs, learners are presented with sensorimotor problems. Abrahamson and colleagues developed the "Mathematical Imagery Trainer" platform to explore this design. In one particular version of this platform, designed to teach proportions to learners, they moved two cursors with both hands to turn a screen green. The screen would only turn green when the height of right and left hands from the base had a particular ratio. Once learners discovered the strategy to solve this problem, the grid and numerals are added to the screen to shift learners from a qualitative to a quantitative understanding of the concept at hand.

Overall, embodied cognition has served as a new framework for exploring the learning process and developing new educational practices. The older educational methods are slowly being replaced or complemented by the new approaches inspired by embodied cognition theory.

=== School ===
Embodied cognition has increasingly informed educational practice, particularly in school settings. A 2025 scoping review by Faella, Digennaro and Iannaccone identified a range of embodied learning strategies applied in classrooms, demonstrating positive effects on student engagement, conceptual understanding, and learning outcomes.

Key approaches include:

- Kinesthetic learning activities – Incorporating physical movement into instruction, such as using gestures to represent mathematical operations or dramatising historical events, supports comprehension and long-term retention.
- Gesture-based learning – Encouraging the use of spontaneous or instructed hand gestures while learning enhances cognitive processing and memory formation.
- Use of physical manipulatives – Tangible tools are employed, particularly in mathematics and science, to help students internalise abstract concepts through direct sensorimotor interaction.
- Technology integration – Motion-based digital tools, such as virtual reality and embodied learning games, create multisensory environments that engage learners more deeply.

The review also noted the importance of teacher training in embodied learning methods and the design of flexible classroom spaces that facilitate movement and interaction. Overall, the integration of embodied cognition principles into school curricula has been linked to improved academic performance, motivation, and cognitive development.

=== AI and robotics ===
Embodied cognition has significantly impacted artificial intelligence (AI) and robotics; it has contributed to the drastic changes AI has been through over the last years. Insights from embodied cognition have allowed researchers to build more dynamic robots with more fluid and more expressive motions facilitating better performance in complex scenarios.

Shakey the robot is a well-known milestone in AI; it was one of the first approaches to building mobile robots capable of reasoning about their own actions and performing specific tasks in a determined environment. Shakey had a relatively simple body and followed commands by itself, melding logical reasoning with physical action to navigate in a room. A limitation was that Shakey's architecture (Lisp) relied heavily on symbolic computational principles that, consequently, demanded that it iterate through long command sequences to perform a particular action. Thus, Shakey was slow and could take days to complete particular tasks. Besides, Shakey's performance was constrained by a highly controlled environment.

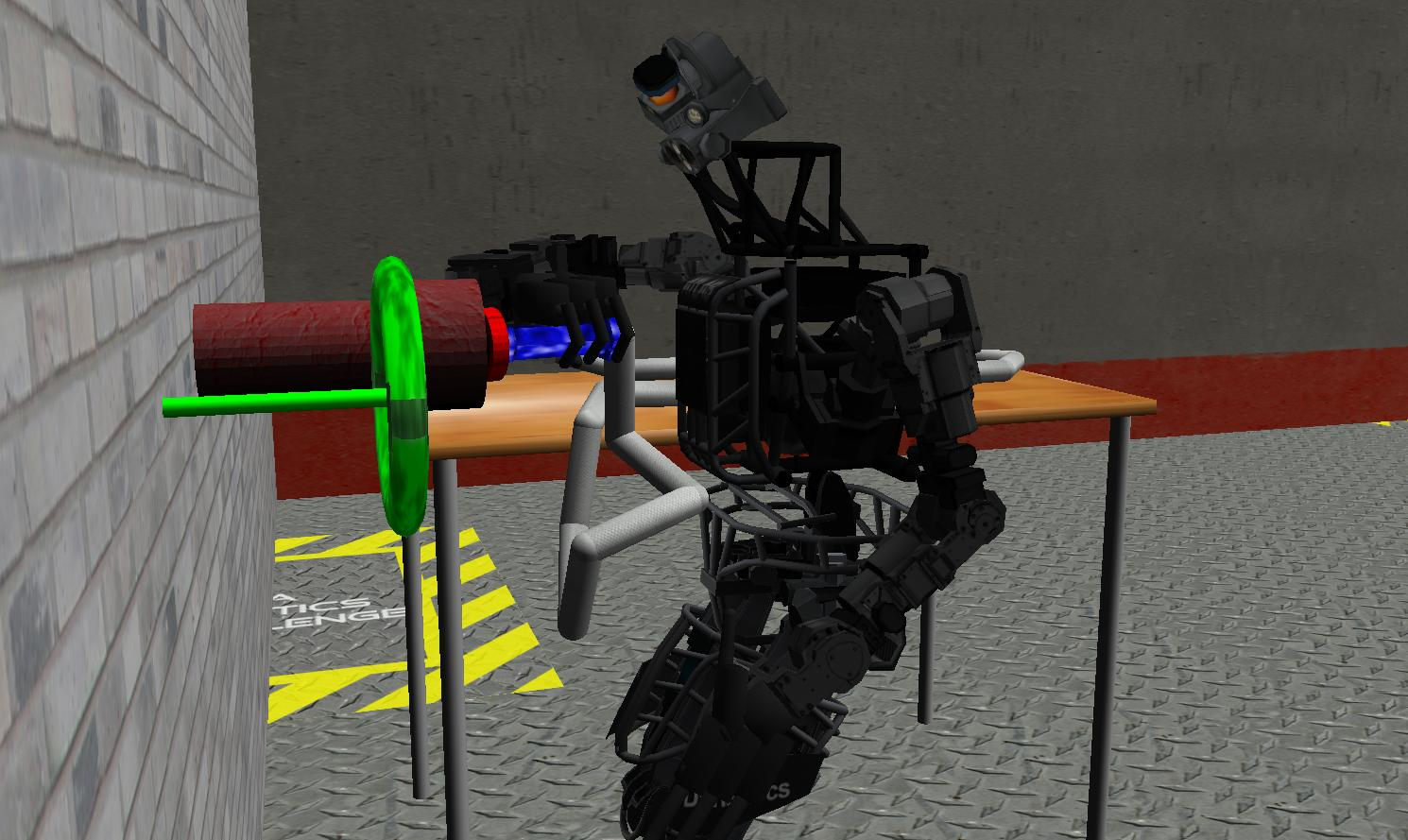
An Atlas robot connecting a hose to a pipe in a Gazebo computer simulation

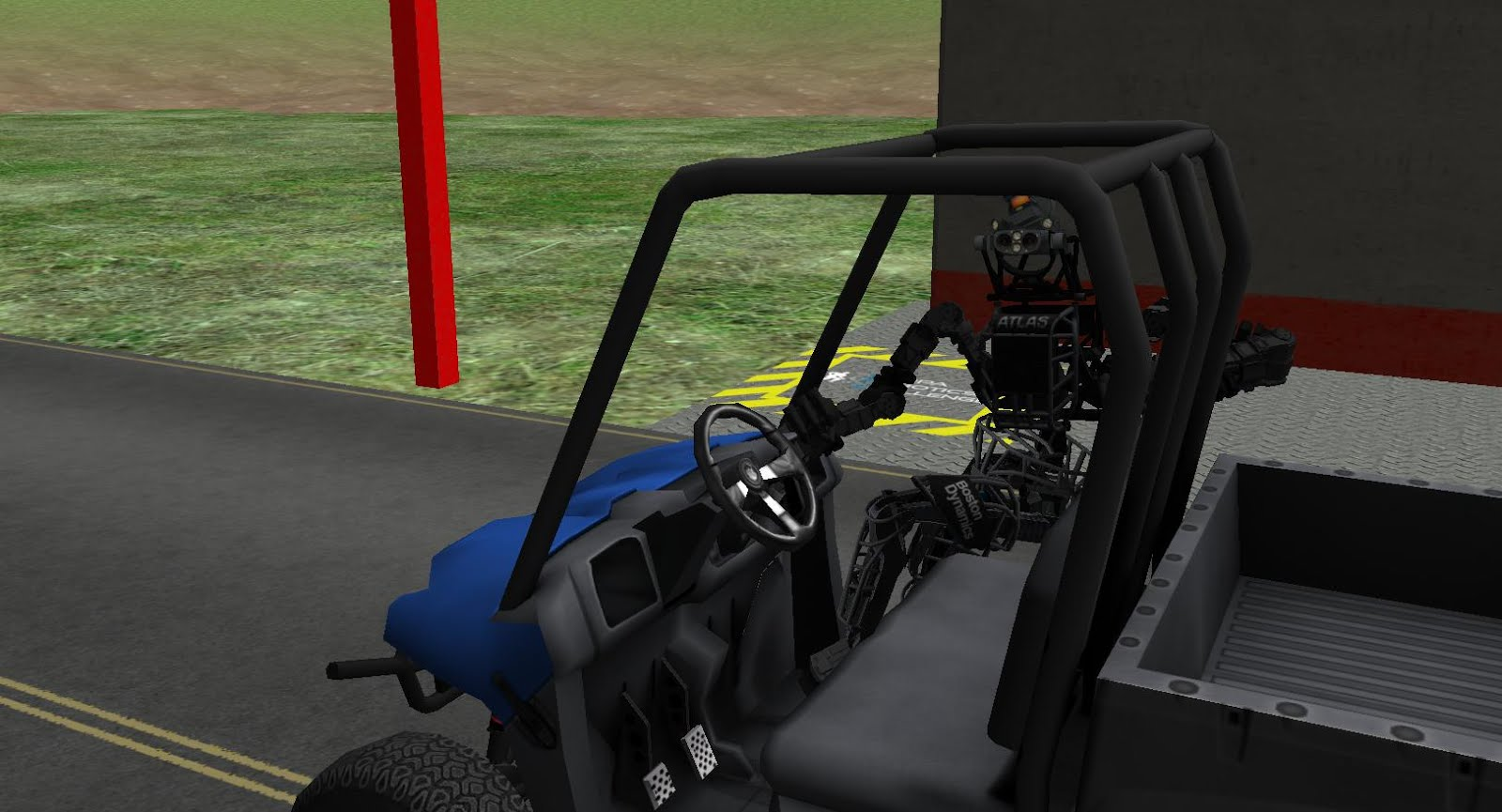
An Atlas robot climbing into a vehicle. The image was recreated in a Gazebo computer simulation.

Embodied AI tries not to overlook or underestimate the "body" when creating AI systems. It poses that future research should move towards systems that incorporate embodied perspectives. The body as a contributor to states of the mind is seen as more than a mere follower of (algorithmic) instructions. Embodiment is said to shape intelligent information processing because "intelligence is fundamentally a result of embodied interaction which exploits structure in the world".

Embodied AI gave birth to situated robotic perspectives that included more versatile AI architectures. Situated robotics are based on an incremental approach to AI and reliance on parallel activity producers that interface effectively with action and perception. Unlike traditional robots, situated robots perform better in complex and dynamic environments that create unpredictable situations for robots most of the time. The behavior of these robots changes according to their environment so that they can deal with incredibility in various situations. For instance, social situations are rife with unpredictability, and social robots need to be able to predict all sorts of behaviors—human or otherwise. In this vein, Jun Tani's lab has introduced an abstract brain model called PV-RNN, based on the principle of free energy, and has incorporated a meta-prior in it. While a high meta-prior leads to a confident behavior generation in robots and ignores the behavior of other robots, robots with a low meta-prior adapt to the behaviour of other robots and avoid generating their own behavioral pattern.

Instances of situated robots include aerial robots developed by companies such as senseFly, which produces fixed-wing autonomous drones for professional use, owned by Parrot SA, and Flyability, which builds drones for the inspection and exploration of indoor and confined spaces. They rely on the research of Dario Floreano's laboratory on mini-robots and evolutionary robotics.

Another example of situated robots is Atlas. Built in 2013 by Boston Dynamics, Atlas is an anthropomorphic robot with a height of 1.5 m and a weight of 89 kg that can move with agility and diversity in various situations. The algorithms of Atlas allow for the complex and dynamic interaction between its body and the environment. The movement of Atlas is driven by perception and has evolved over time from on-fly adjustment to perceiving its environment.

=== Clinical settings ===
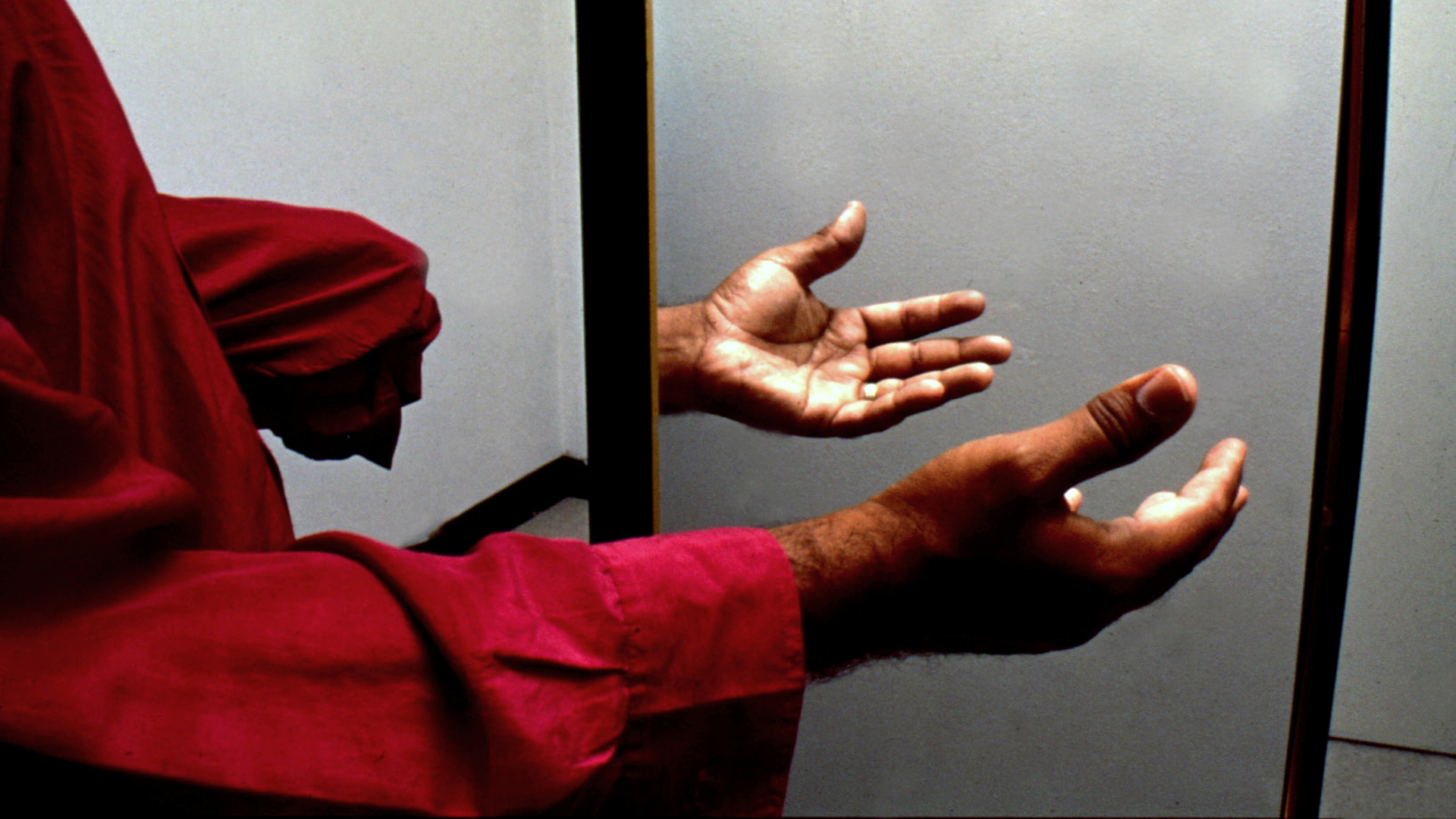
The experience of the phantom limb illusion, which occurs after a limb has been amputated

The procedures and methods of investigation in clinical neuropsychology have been directly influenced by localization and computational approaches to cognition. These techniques have made numerous contributions to the development of clinical practice. Embodied cognition broadens the scope of clinical practice by providing a more comprehensive view of cognitive processes under both normal and pathological conditions by highlighting the role of the body and sensory-motor experience in cognition. Thereby, challenging the integration of embodied cognitive practices in clinical assessment and diagnosis processes. For instance, there exist a number of interventions and therapies which are incorporating the ability of the body to influence cognitive states to aid individuals with psychological difficulties. An example is the already established use of behavioral treatments for children's disorders such as autism. Another example of embodied integrative therapies involves sensorimotor retraining as well as stimulation techniques to prevent, reduce, or release pain associated with phantom limbs. Also, fields of psychotherapy (body oriented psychotherapy and somatic psychology), which are prominent in Europe and encompasses embodied interventions such as dance and movement therapy, have begun to receive more empirical support. Vittorio Guidano's post-rationalist cognitive therapy builds on Humberto Maturana and Francisco Varela's theory of autopoiesis and postulates that human knowledge is emotional and embodied. One of the most common integrative treatments of mental illness to the western psychosocial sphere is via mindfulness practices and exercise.

=== Sport ===
Embodied cognitive perspectives can inform and impact motor skill research in the fields of sport and sport psychology. Studies have shown that the embodiment thesis comes into action through many ways in sport such as sport-related action-specific perception, understanding, prediction, judgement, training, and language comprehension. From an embodied cognition perspective, a study examined the relationship between previous motor and visual experience and the current officiating experience of expert judges and referees. It was reported that sports judges who had performed the judged tasks and/or had experience observing others perform the specific tasks would achieve better in judging a specific sport activity compared to someone without this motor and observational experience. In another study, reading comprehension and memory were shown to be improved if the subject would simultaneously read the description of certain physical activity (e.g. basketball actions) and perform physical manipulations that were consistent with them. The action-based theory of reading comprehension states that the sensory system and motor system are involved during the process of understanding, imagining, and remembering an action described in a story, as if the reader was actually perceiving or executing that action. These and similar studies show the influence of embodied cognition in sport and sport psychology.

=== Music ===
Embodied music cognition is a paradigm that puts forward the idea that bodily interactions with music significantly affect music cognition. Researchers proposed that musical emotions, meaning, and the feelings evoked by listening to music, are the vehicle for the embodiment of abstract thoughts. The complex resulting is as an epi-phenomenon bodily happenings is called by the pedagogists of music Corporeal Musicality.Thus music has a specific cognitive function that allows for this possibility. Researcher have suggested embodied music cognition occurs at two levels: the surface level and the primary level. The surface level includes psychomotor activities of a music performer, visible bodily reactions to music, and rhythmic entrainment. The primary level of embodied music cognition is the tonal/temporal encoding of it; it commands the surface level.

The research on embodied music cognition focuses on two main trends: exploring embodiment and expanding the concept of embodiment in music. The first trend includes studies investigating bodily articulation and gesturing in relation to music. Embodied music cognition considers musical experiences from an action and perception viewpoint. One can observe that many people move when they listen to music; in many cultures there is no clear distinction between music and dance. Through the different movements of the body, it is assumed that people are able to give meaning to music. This perspective is different from the traditional approach to music cognition, which bases musical meaning on merely perception-based analysis of musical structure. Through the measurement of sounds, movement, human physiology, and computational modeling, embodied music cognition is constantly building up reliable knowledge about the role of the human body in musical meaning formation. Marina Korsakova-Kreyn (2018) proposes that musical cognition operates on two interrelated levels of embodiment. The surface level refers to observable bodily responses to music, including performers’ motor actions, visible gestures, and rhythmic entrainment in listeners. This level reflects the apparent physical articulation of musical experience. The deep level is less visible and concerns the internal physiological and perceptual responses to tonal and temporal structures. Korsakova-Kreyn argues that musical meaning originates in how the body reacts to tonal relationships arranged over time. These relationships are built from basic melodic intervals that vary in tonal stability, consonance, and dissonance, creating expectations that guide melodic intentionality and the perception of musical motion. Tonal–temporal structures are therefore understood as encoding musical content that shapes motor behavior and underlies emotional and cognitive responses to music. This model links traditional musicological concepts with findings from music perception, affective neuroscience, and brain plasticity in musicians. The theory focuses on tonal music of the European tradition and does not address aleatoric or non-Western musical systems. To make the model accessible to nonmusicians, the original paper includes explanations of basic music theory. Embodied music cognition is potentially applicable to better understand the role of music in social interactions. Multiple studies show that children move more synchronously with music when they dance as a group.

The second trend includes studies that strive to connect embodied music cognition to other research fields such as neurology and psychology. For example, a study showed that people who have Parkinson's disease and are primed by music instead of metronomes beeps are capable of both entrainment and control. The study suggests that using the body to produce timed sequences of action, particularly when music is used as a pacing cue, allows people who have Parkinson's disease to achieve similar performance levels as healthy individuals.

=== Social psychology ===
The embodiment has also important potential applications in social psychology, where researchers have studied how people's own bodily states influence their understanding and interaction with others. Researchers have provided evidence demonstrating the influence of bodily states on social judgments and social behavior. They described that people's experiences with physical temperature per se can influence their perceptions of and prosocial behavior toward other people, without their awareness. When people engage in motor movements that symbolized a particular social category, it primes the use of such category in social judgment.

Activists have tried to combine social psychology research with principles of embodiment to further their goals. For instance, virtual reality (VR) has been used in what is called virtual reality therapy to invoke empathy in viewers. The New York Times created a VR project to display the experience of child refugees called "The Displaced". By grounding users in the experience of child refugees from different countries, this project triggered strong empathy in viewers. In the "6 x 9" project, Guardian has used VR to replicate the experience of solitary confinement in American prisons. "Notes on Blindness: Into Darkness" released in 2016, an exploration of the sensory, emotional, psychological experience of blindness using VR.

== Controversy ==
Research on embodied cognition is extremely broad, covering a wide range of concepts. Methods to study how human cognition is embodied vary from experiment to experiment based on the operational definition used by researchers. The evidence supporting embodiment abounds within the different sciences, yet the interpretation of results and their significance are still disputed and researchers continue looking for appropriate ways to study and explain embodied cognition.

Interbrain neuroscience research in adults and growing evidence of goal-directed behavior in fetuses raise doubts regarding independence and self-sufficiency of dynamical system approaches to embodied cognition. Indeed, there are severe concerns about this viewpoint as the only possible way to explain cognitive development in organisms at an early stage; it seems that the complex process of emerging cognition requires complementary views.

=== Binding problem ===
The binding problem is the viewpoint on how organisms at the simple reflexes stage of development overcome the threshold of the environmental chaos of sensory stimuli. Using mathematical tools of communication theory, it shows the insuperable high threshold of the cacophony of environmental stimuli (the stimuli noise) for young organisms at the onset of life. While young organisms need to combine objects, backgrounds, and abstract or emotional features into a single experience to build a surrounding reality, they cannot independently distinguish relevant sensory stimuli. Embodied dynamical systems cannot get around the cue to noise problem. This ability requires categorizing the environment into objects that come into being through (and only after) perception and intentionality.

=== Research with preverbal infants ===
Researchers have suggested that pre-verbal infants may be considered an ideal and naturalistic case for studying embodied cognition, especially embodied social cognition since they utilise symbols less than adults do. Some researchers have criticised this notion since it may be impossible to know which stage of a preverbal infant is supposed to be the "ideal model" for embodied social cognition, as infant cognition changes dramatically throughout the preverbal period. A 9-month-old has reached a different developmental stage than a 2-month-old.

Another major issue is whether or not a particular ability reflects an embodied mode of processing. Looking-time, for example, is said to likely be a better measure of embodied cognition than reaching because infants that age lack certain fine motor skills. Infants may first develop a passive mode of embodied cognition before they develop the active mode involving fine motor movements. Researchers have described how this is problematic in that there is no apparent reason to suppose that the abilities described through looking-time paradigm reflect embodied processing. For the distinction between embodied and symbolic modes of processing to be useful in generating testable experimental hypotheses, it must be clear what sort of evidence could, at least in principle, allow a researcher to determine whether or not any particular ability is embodied.

=== Replication crisis and misinterpretation ===
A methodological phenomenon in the sciences is the replication crisis. Inside the field of embodied cognition, it indicates that certain findings have failed to be reproduced with the same results as the originals. Such studies have in common the embodiment idea that bodily experiences influence cognitive processes that are typically considered as mental. For example, power posing which is classified under embodied cognition because it states that having a person physically expand their body increases their confidence, failed to be replicated in several cases. Similarly, studies indicating that weight sensations activate concepts of importance, which in turn may affect morality-related variables, has also failed to be replicated. Researchers also could not replicate the previous findings claiming that holding a warm cup creates a sense of interpersonal warmth.

Researchers failing to replicate the same results does not prove cognition is unaffected/uninfluenced by the body. There are still plenty of findings within the topic of embodied cognition that are scientifically sound. Some researchers state that many of the failed attempts to replicate embodiment findings are due to priming. And many cases of facilitative movements of the body due to priming may be incorrectly labeled as evidence of embodied cognition. The pencil-in-teeth study evidencing embodied cognition may be considered the result of priming. Researchers could have deduced that the quicker responses to positive sentences by participants engaging their smiling muscles indicated embodied cognition. Opponents argue that the effects obtained during this experiment were primed or facilitated by the engagement of certain facial muscles. Priming (pencil in teeth, lips) may causally induce certain perceptual-motor activity that, in turn, induces certain cognitive processes, without the perceptual-motor activity constituting cognitive processing.

== See also ==
- Action-specific perception
- Active inference
- Blue Brain Project
- Cognitive biology
- Cognitive linguistics
- Cognitive neuropsychology
- Cognitive neuroscience
- Cognitive science
- Computationalism
- Conceptual blending
- Conceptual metaphor
- Cortical homunculus
- Ecological psychology
- Embodied bilingual language
- Embodied cognitive science
- Embodied embedded cognition
- Embodied music cognition
- Embodied phenomenology
- Enactivism
- Extended cognition
- Extended mind thesis
- Externalism
- Facial feedback hypothesis
- Feeling
- Image schema
- Metaphors We Live By
- Moravec's paradox
- Motor cognition
- Neuroconstructivism
- Neuropsychology
- Neurophenomenology
- Philosophy of mind
- Plant cognition
- Women, Fire, and Dangerous Things

== Bibliography ==
- Brook RA (1999). Cambrian Intelligence: The Early History of the New AI. Cambridge MA: The MIT Press. ISBN 978-0-262-52263-2.
- Clark A (1997). Being There: Putting Brain, Body and World Together Again. Cambridge MA: The MIT Press. ISBN 978-0-262-53156-6.
- Damásio A (1999). The Feeling of What Happens: Body and Emotion in the Making of Consciousness. New York: Houghton Mifflin Harcourt. ISBN 978-0-15-601075-7.
- Edelman G (2004). Wider than the Sky: The Phenomenal Gift of Consciousness. Yale University Press. ISBN 978-0-300-10229-1.
- Gallagher S (2005). How the Body Shapes the Mind. Oxford: Oxford University Press. ISBN 978-0-19-920416-8.
- Hendriks-Jansen H (1996). Catching Ourselves in the Act: Situated Activity, Interactive Emergence, Evolution, and Human Thought. Cambridge MA: The MIT Press. ISBN 978-0-262-08246-4.
- Francisco Varela (1991). Embodied Mind. Cambridge MA: The MIT Press. ISBN 978-0-262-08246-4.
- Hyun JS, Luck SJ (February 2007). "Visual working memory as the substrate for mental rotation". Psychonomic Bulletin & Review. 14 (1): 154–158. doi:10.3758/bf03194043. PMID 17546746.
- Lakoff G, Johnson M (1980). Metaphors We Live By. University of Chicago Press. ISBN 978-0-226-46801-3.
- Lakoff G (1987). Women, Fire, and Dangerous Things: What Categories Reveal About the Mind. University of Chicago Press. ISBN 978-0-226-46804-4.
- Lakoff G, Turner M (1989). More Than Cool Reason: A Field Guide to Poetic Metaphor. University of Chicago Press. ISBN 978-0-226-46812-9.
- Lakoff G, Johnson M (1999). Philosophy In The Flesh: the Embodied Mind and its Challenge to Western Thought. Basic Books. ISBN 978-0-465-05674-3.
- Maturana M; Varela F (1987). The Tree of Knowledge: The Biological Roots of Human Understanding. Boston: Shambhala. ISBN 978-0-87773-373-7.
- Pfeifer R (2001). Understanding Intelligence. Cambridge MA: The MIT Press. ISBN 978-0-262-16181-7.
- Varela, Francisco; Thomson, Evan; Rosch, Eleanor (1991). The Embodied Mind: Cognitive Science and Human Experience. Cambridge, Massachusetts: MIT Press.
- Greeno JG, Moore JL (1993). "Situativity and symbols: Response to Vera and Simon". Cognitive Science. 17: 49–59. doi:10.1207/s15516709cog1701_3. S2CID 2258750.
- Wilson M (March 2001). "The case for sensorimotor coding in working memory". Psychonomic Bulletin & Review. 8 (1): 44–57. doi:10.3758/BF03196138. PMID 11340866. S2CID 8984921.
