= Action-specific perception =

Psychological theory on perception

Action-specific perception, or perception-action, is a psychological theory that people perceive their environment and events within it in terms of their ability to act. This theory hence suggests a person's capability to carry out a particular task affects how they perceive the different aspects and methods involved in that task. For example, softball players who are hitting better see the ball as bigger. Tennis players see the ball as moving more slowly when they successfully return the ball. In the field of human-computer interaction, alterations in accuracy impact both the perception of size and time, while adjustments in movement speed impact the perception of distance. Furthermore, the perceiver's intention to act is also critical; while the perceiver's ability to perform the intended action influences perception, the perceiver's abilities for unintended actions have little or no effect on perception. Finally, the objective difficulty of the task appears to modulate size, distance, and time perception.

== Overview ==
Action-specific effects have been documented in a variety of contexts and with a variety of manipulations. The original work was done on perceived slant of hills and perceived distance to targets. Hills look steeper and targets look further away when wearing a heavy backpack. In addition to walking, many other actions influence perception such as throwing, jumping, falling, reaching, grasping, kicking, hitting, blocking, and swimming. In addition to perceived slant and perceived distance, other aspects of perception are influenced by ability such as size, shape, height, and speed. These results have been documented in athletes such as softball players, golfers, tennis players, swimmers, and people skilled in parkour. However, a criticism would be that these action-specific effects on perception may surface only in extreme cases (e.g., professional athletes) or condition (e.g., steep hills). Recent evidence from virtual reality indicated that these action-specific effects are observed in both "normal" conditions and average individuals.

== Background ==
The action-specific perception account has roots in Gibson's (1979) ecological approach to perception. According to Gibson, the primary objects of perception are affordances, which are the possibilities for action. Affordances capture the mutual relationship between the environment and the perceiver. For example, a tall wall is a barrier to an elderly person, but affords jumping over to someone trained in parkour, or urban climbing. Like the ecological approach, the action-specific perception account favors the notion that perception involves processes which relate the environment to the perceiver's potential for action. Consequently, similar environments will look different, depending on the abilities of each perceiver. Since abilities change over time, an individual's perception of similar environments will also change as their abilities change.

== Criticisms ==
The claim that activity and intention influence perception is controversial. These findings challenge traditional theories of perception, nearly all of which conceptualize perception as a process that provides an objective and behaviorally-independent representation of the environment. The fact that the same environment looks different depending on the perceiver's abilities and intentions implies perception is not behaviorally-neutral.

Alternative explanations for apparent action-specific effects have been proposed, most commonly that the perceiver's ability affects the perceiver's judgment about what they see, rather than affecting perception itself. In other words, perceivers see the world similarly, but then report their impressions differently.

== Problems ==
Perception cannot be measured directly. Researchers must instead rely on reports, judgments, and behaviors. However, many attempts have been made to resolve this issue. One technique is to use many different kinds of perceptual judgments. For example, action-specific effects have been found when using verbal reports and visual matching tasks. Action-specific effects are also apparent with indirect measures such as perceived parallelism as a proxy for perceived distance. Action-specific effects have also been found when using action-based measures such as Blindwalking.

== See also ==
- Active inference – a generic formulation of embodied perception based on variational (Bayesian) free energy minimisation
- Active vision – an area of computer vision and machine learning concerned with active sampling of sensory data
- Affordance
- Ecological psychology
- James J. Gibson
- Motor cognition – the notion that cognition is embodied in action, and the motor system participates in what is usually considered as mental processing.
- Motor theory of speech perception – the hypothesis that people perceive spoken words by identifying the vocal tract gestures with how they are pronounced rather than by identifying the sound patterns which speech generates.
- Perception
- Qualia
- Embodied cognition
