= Embodied music cognition =

Musicology concept

Embodied music cognition as it was originally a direction within systematic musicology interested in studying the role of the human body in relation to all musical activities, actually acquired also the meaning of an approach to music feeling and performing through body; in other words: "Corporeal Musicality". But by an historical point of view we can coming back to an essay of Francisco Varela in 1991 where we can find the root of thinking the body as true location of mental experiences. It considers the human body as the natural mediator between mind (focused on musical intentions, meanings, significations) and physical environment (containing musical sound and other types of energy that affords human action). Thus we have, respect the old metaphisical cartesian cognition of "a mind and a body" in the new that theorize a body-mind unity. Therefore, Embodied Music Cognion born by and is referring the general Embodied Cognition, and this is evidently the basical theory from which became possible to deal with the concept of musicality actualizing through body: for that we can also call it ‘’Corporeal Musicality’’.

It be said also that ‘’embodiment’’ could be seen as a ‘’pragmatic view’’ of what happen in music whitin our body concerns also the physiolooy. That mirrors the idea of a (qualitative) experience concerning production by interactions, explained in writing as Art As Experience by pragmatist philosopher-psychologist John Dewey.

== Introduction ==
Given the impact of body movement on musical meaning formation and signification, the musical mind is said to be embodied. The Embodiment assumes that what happens in the mind is depending on properties of the body, such as kinaesthetic properties. We can also go back to see that Embodied Music Cognion born by and referring the general Embodied Cognition, and that is evidently the basical theory from which became possible to put the concept of musicality actualizing through body and thherefore been theorize the ‘’Corporeal Musicality’’ It be said also that ‘’incorporation’’ could be seen as a ‘’pragmatic view’’ of what happen in music whitin our body. Thus it is seen to mirror the idea of a (qualitative) experience concerning production by interactions with works such as in Art As Experience by pragmatist philosopher-psychologist John Dewey. Dewey thinks that human experiences are regarding people's personal lives as they are the by-product of continuous and commutative interactions of a biological and organic “self” (an “incarnated ‘’ego’’) in aworld. These lived (corporeal) experiences should serve as the foundation to build “selfish identity An other position is that of cognitivist George Lakoff which see embodiment to be resulting of a relationship between cognition and bodily process. Thus cognition has to see as the sensory and motor mechanisms enabling reciprocally Peter Putnam and Robert W. Fuller advanced a version of the computational theory of mind, perceptual control theory and neuroplasticity wherein rules become fixed in the brain's structure based on trial and error and motor neuron feedback loops.

Embodied music cognition tends to see music perception as based on action. For example, many people move when they listen to music. Through movement, it is assumed that people give meaning to music. This type of meaning-formation is corporeal, rather than cerebral because it is understood through the body. This is different from a disembodied approach to music cognition, which sees musical meaning as being based on a perception-based analysis of musical structure. The embodied grounding of music perception is based on a multi-modal encoding of auditory information and on principles that ensure the coupling of perception and action.

Two-Level Model of Embodied Cognition in Music

Marina Korsakova-Kreyn (2018) proposes that musical cognition operates on two interrelated levels of embodiment. The surface level refers to observable bodily responses to music, including performers’ motor actions, visible gestures, and rhythmic entrainment in listeners. This level reflects the apparent physical articulation of musical experience.

The deep level is less visible and concerns the internal physiological and perceptual responses to tonal and temporal structures. Korsakova-Kreyn argues that musical meaning originates in how the body reacts to tonal relationships arranged over time. These relationships are built from basic melodic intervals that vary in tonal stability, consonance, and dissonance, creating expectations that guide melodic intentionality and the perception of musical motion. Tonal–temporal structures are therefore understood as encoding musical content that shapes motor behavior and underlies emotional and cognitive responses to music.

This model links traditional musicological concepts with findings from music perception, affective neuroscience, and brain plasticity in musicians. The theory focuses on tonal music of the European tradition and does not address aleatoric or non-Western musical systems. To make the model accessible to nonmusicians, the original paper includes explanations of basic music theory.

During the last decade, research in embodied music cognition has been strongly motivated by a demand for new tools in view of the interactive possibilities offered by digital media technology.

With the advent of powerful computing tools, and in particular real-time interactive music systems, gradually more attention has been devoted to the role of gesture in music. This musical gestures research has been rather influential in that it puts more emphasis on sensorimotor feedback and integration, as well as on the coupling of perception and action. With new sensor technology, gesture-based research has meanwhile become a vast domain of music research, with consequences for the methodological and epistemological foundations of music cognition research.

== Method ==
The scientific apparatus draws upon an empirical and evidence-based methodology, which is based on measurement of sound (via audio-recording), human movement (via video-recording, kinematic recording), human biology (via bioparameter-recording) and semantics (via questionnaires). Using a scientific apparatus for measurement, statistical analysis and computational modelling, embodied music cognition aims to build up reliable knowledge about the role of the human body in meaning formation.

== Applications ==
Research in embodied music cognition has a strong connection with technology development, more particularly, in fields related to interactive music systems, and music information retrieval. Mediation technology is the technology by which the human body, and consequently also the human mind could be considered as an extension in the digital musical domain.

== How it is distinct from (disembodied) music cognition ==
Cartesian dualism had a tremendous impact on cognitive science and in particular on cognitive musicology. Influenced by Gestalt psychology, music cognition research of the last decades of the 20th Century was mainly focusing on the perception of structure, that is, the perception of pitch, melody, rhythm, harmony and tonality. It considered music perception as a faculty on its own, completely dissociated from musical action. Instead, in studies on embodied musical activity (such as listening and music performance), subjects are invited to actively engage in the signification process. This engagement is articulated by means of corporeal expression which can be measured, analyzed, modelled and related to the musical stimulus. René Descartes' idea that mental activity is of a separate order from body movement is refuted and, in fact reversed.

== How it is distinct from traditional musicology ==
The difference with the traditional phenomenological and hermeneutic approaches to musical meaning formation is that embodied music cognition has a focus on an empirical and evidence-based methodology, rather than on subjective first-person descriptions. Embodied music cognition aims at giving a full account of the subjective involvement by taking into account the role of the social-cultural context, subjective background (involving gender, age, familiarity with music, degree of music education).

Embodied music cognition adopts a scientific methodology but its aim is not to reduce music to physics, nor to reduce gesture and embodied meaning to the biomechanics of the human body. Instead, embodied music cognition fully recognizes the contribution of all mental and bodily systems including subjective feelings, emotions and coinaesthetic (or body image) awareness.

== Correlated Arguments ==
- Embodied cognition
- Music psychology
- Musical gesture
- Music philosophy
- Music therapy
- Musicality

== Bibliography ==
- Godøy, Rolf and Marc Leman, eds. (2010). Musical gestures : sound, movement, and meaning, New York: Routledge.
- Korsakova-Kreyn, M. (2018). Two-level model of embodied cognition in music. Psychomusicology: Music, Mind, and Brain, 28(4), 240–259.
- Leman, Marc (2007). Embodied Music Cognition and Mediation Technology, Cambridge, Massachusetts: MIT Press.
- López Cano, Rubén (2003). “Setting the body in music. Gesture, Schemata and Stylistic-Cognitive Types”. International Conference on Music and Gesture University of East Anglia 28–31 August 2003. (available on line)
- López Cano, Rubén (2006). “What kind of affordances are musical affordances? A semiotic approach”. Paper presented at L’ascolto musicale: condotte, pratiche, grammatiche. Bologna 23–25 February 2006. (available on line)
- López Cano, Rubén (2008). “Che tipo di affordances sono le affordances musicali? Una prospettiva semiotica”. En Daniele Barbieri, Luca Marconi e Francesco Spampinato (eds.). L'ascolto: condotte, pratiche, grammatiche. Lucca: LIM. pp. 43–54.
- Matyja, J. R. (2016). Embodied Music Cognition: Trouble Ahead, Trouble Behind. Frontiers in Psychology, 7. https://doi.org/10.3389/fpsyg.2016.01891
- Reybrouck, Mark. (2001a). “Biological roots of musical epistemology: Functional Cycles, Umwelt, and enactive listening”. Semiotica, 134 (1-4): 599-633.
- Reybrouck, Mark. (2001b). "Musical Imagery between Sensory Processing and Ideomotor Simulation". En Musical Imagery, eds. I. Godøy y H.Jörgensen, 117-136, Lisse: Swets & Zeitlinger.
- Reybrouck, Mark. (2005a). “A Biosemiotic and Ecological Approach to Music Cognition: Event Perception between Auditory Listening and Cognitive Economy”. Axiomathes. An International Journal in Ontology and Cognitive Systems, 15 (2): 229-266.
- Reybrouck, Mark. (2005b). “Body, mind and music: musical semantics between experiential cognition and cognitive economy”. TRANS 9. (available on line)
- Varela Francisco, Thomson Evan and Eleanor Rosch, 1991, or Rosch). The Embodied Mind: Cognitive Science and Human Experience. MIT Press. ISBN 978-0-262-72021-2.
- Zbikowski, Lawrence M. (2002). Conceptualizing Music: Cognitive Structure, Theory, and Analysis, New York: Oxford University Press.
