= Musical gesture =

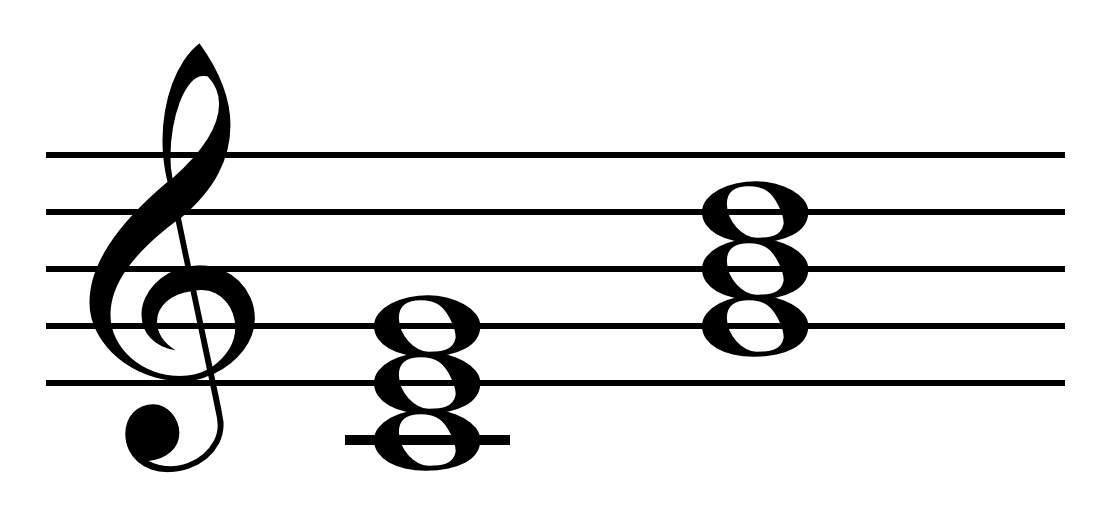
Tonic and dominant in C. C major and G major chords.

Layout of a musical keyboard (three octaves shown).

In music, gesture is any movement, either physical (bodily) or mental (imaginary). As such "gesture" includes both categories of movements required to produce sound and categories of perceptual moves associated with those gestures. The concept of musical gestures has received much attention in various musicological disciplines (e.g. music analysis, music therapy, music psychology, NIME) in recent years.

For example, the "musical" movement from a close-position tonic C major chord to a close-position dominant G major chord requires on the piano the physical movement from each white key of the first chord to the right (in space, upwards in pitch) four white keys or steps. Thus gesture includes both characteristic physical movements by performers and characteristic melodies, phrases, chord progressions, and arpeggiations produced by (or producing) those movements.

== Introduction ==
The concept of musical gestures encompasses a large territory stretching from details of sound-production to more global emotive and aesthetic images of music, and also include considerations of cultural-stylistic vs. more universal modes of expression. In all cases, it is believed that musical gestures manifest the primordial role of human movement in music. For this reason, scholars speak of embodied music cognition in the sense that listeners relate musical sound to mental images of gestures, i.e. that listening (or even merely imagining music) also is a process of incessant mental re-enactment of musical gestures.

Acknowledging the multimodal nature of music perception, embodied music cognition could represent a change of paradigm in music theory and other music related research, research which has often tended to exclude considerations of bodily movement from its conceptual apparatus in favour of focus on more abstract, notation-based elements of music. Focusing on musical gestures provides a coherent and unifying perspective for a renewal of music theory and other music research.

== Music-related body movement ==
A subset of musical gestures is what could be called music-related body movement, which can be seen from either the performer's or the perceiver's point of view:

- Performer - movements that are part of a music performance or a performance with music:
  - Sound-producing: musician or actor creating musical sound.
  - Sound-accompanying: dance or other types of movements that are linked to music.
- Perceiver - movements that are an integral part of music listening:
  - Directly connected: dance, air performance
  - Loosely connected: running, training.
  - Grooving: tapping a foot, nodding the head, etc.

== Formal definition ==
The first mathematical definition of gesture is given in the paper "Formulas, Diagrams, and Gestures in Music" (Journal of Mathematics and Music, Vol 1, Nr. 1 2007) by Guerino Mazzola (University of Minnesota) and Moreno Andreatta (IRCAM in Paris). A gesture is a configuration of curves in space and time. More formally, a gesture is a digraph morphism from a "skeleton" of addressed points to a "body", a spatial digraph of a topological category (in the musical case: time, position and pitch). Since the set of gestures of given skeleton and topological category defines a topological category, one may define gestures of gestures, so-called hypergestures.

== Gesture in Indian vocal music ==
Indian vocalists move their hands while improvising melody. Although every vocalist has an idiosyncratic gestural style, the motion of the hand and voice are connected through various logics, and many students gesturally resemble their teachers. Nikki Moran, at the University of London, has done research on this topic, and it is one of the subjects of Martin Clayton and Laura Leante's Musical Experience Project at the Open University.

Clayton has published a paper on gestural interaction in Indian music performance: "Time, Gesture and Attention in a Khyal Performance." Asian Music, 38 (2), 71–96.

Matt Rahaim, a vocalist and ethnomusicologist, has published a book on the relationship between vocalization and gesture in Indian vocal music: Musicking Bodies: Gesture and Voice in Hindustani Music. Rahaim's work approaches gesture and vocalization as parallel expressions of melody, investigates isomorphisms between gesture space and raga space, and studies the transmission and inheritance of "paramparic bodies"--vocal/postural/gestural dispositions handed down through teaching lineages.

== Hatten's musical gestures ==
Robert Hatten (2004) has been using the concept of musical gestures to denote inner-musical qualities:

"Musical gesture is biologically and culturally grounded in communicative human movement. Gesture draws upon the close interaction (and intermodality) of a range of human perceptual and motor systems to synthesize the energetic shaping of motion through time into significant events with unique expressive force. The biological and cultural motivations of musical gesture are further negotiated within the conventions of a musical style, whose elements include both the discrete (pitch, rhythm, meter) and the analog (dynamics, articulation, temporal pacing). Musical gestures are emergent gestalts that convey affective motion, emotion, and agency by fusing otherwise separate elements into continuities of shape and force."

== See also ==
- Pitch space
- Transformational theory
