= Affordance =

Possibility of an action on an object or environment

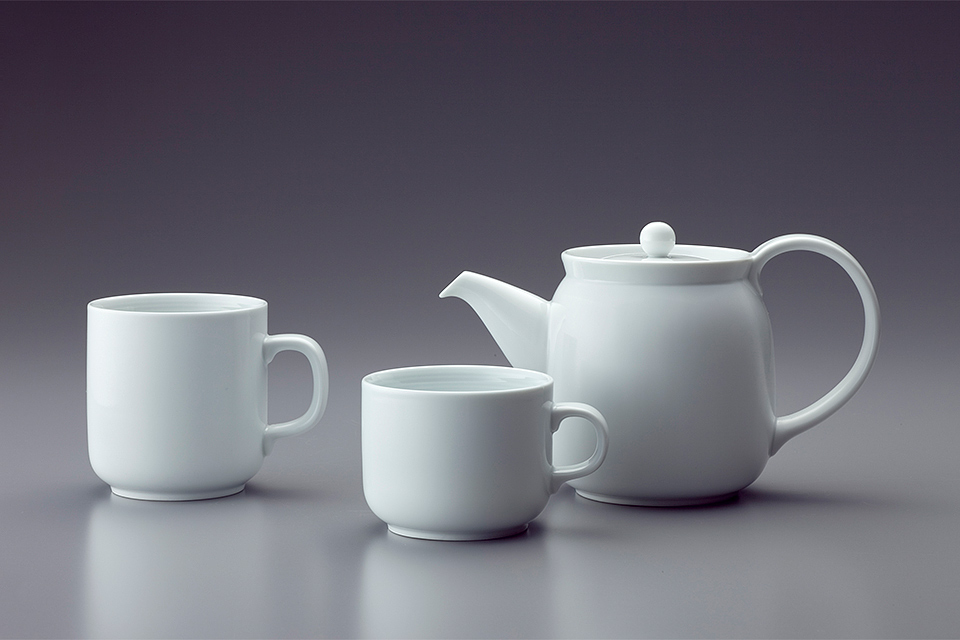
The design of tea cups and a teapot suggest their respective functions.

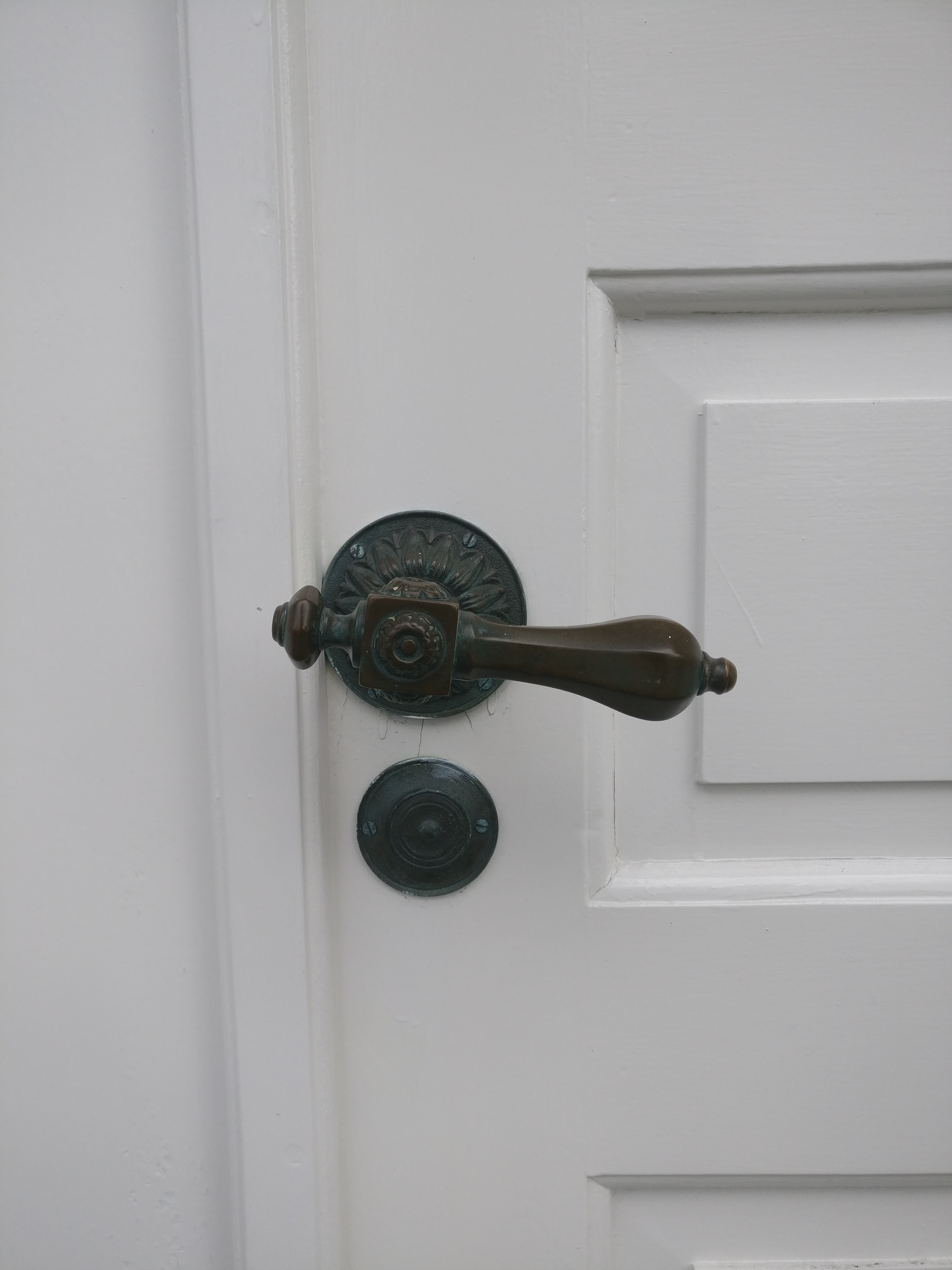
A door knob shaped to reflect how it is used, is an example of a perceivable affordance.

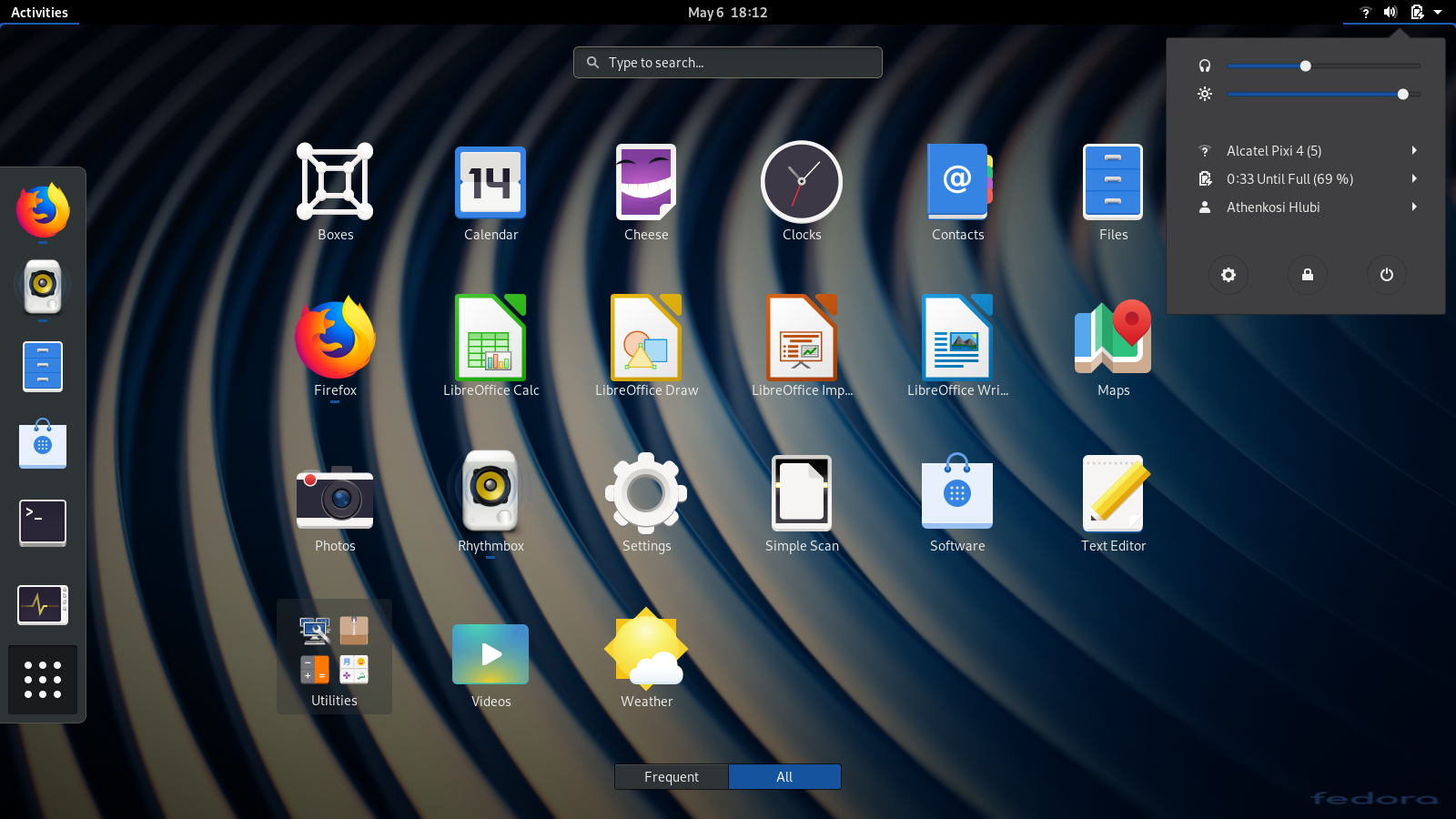
Affordance is one of several design principles used when designing graphical user interfaces.

In psychology, affordance is what the environment offers the individual. In design, affordance has a narrower meaning; it refers to possible actions that an actor can readily perceive.

American psychologist James J. Gibson coined the term in his 1966 book, The Senses Considered as Perceptual Systems, and it occurs in many of his earlier essays. His best-known definition is from his 1979 book, The Ecological Approach to Visual Perception:

The affordances of the environment are what it offers the animal, what it provides or furnishes, either for good or ill. ... It implies the complementarity of the animal and the environment.

The word is used in a variety of fields: perceptual psychology; cognitive psychology; environmental psychology; evolutionary psychology; criminology; industrial design; human–computer interaction (HCI); interaction design; user-centered design; communication studies; instructional design; science, technology, and society (STS); sports science; and artificial intelligence.

== Original development ==
Gibson developed the concept of affordance over many years, culminating in his final book, The Ecological Approach to Visual Perception in 1979. He defined an affordance as what the environment provides or furnishes to an animal. Notably, Gibson compares an affordance with an ecological niche emphasizing the way niches characterize how an animal lives in its environment. This concept has also influenced modern design and human-computer interaction.

The key to understanding affordance is that it is relational and characterizes the suitability of the environment to the observer, and so, depends on their current intentions and their capabilities. For instance, a set of steps which rises 1 metre (3 ft) high does not afford climbing to the crawling infant, yet might provide rest to a tired adult or the opportunity to move to another floor for an adult who wished to reach an alternative destination. This notion of intention/needs is critical to an understanding of affordance, as it explains how the same aspect of the environment can provide different affordances to different people, and even to the same individual at another point in time. As Gibson puts it, “Needs control the perception of affordances (selective attention) and also initiate acts.”

Affordances were further studied by Eleanor J. Gibson, wife of James J. Gibson, who created her theory of perceptual learning around this concept. Her book, An Ecological Approach to Perceptual Learning and Development, explores affordances further.

Gibson's is the prevalent definition in cognitive psychology. According to Gibson, humans tend to alter and modify their environment so as to change its affordances to better suit them. In his view, humans change the environment to make it easier to live in (even if making it harder for other animals to live in it): to keep warm, to see at night, to rear children, and to move around. This tendency to change the environment is natural to humans, and Gibson argues that it is a mistake to treat the social world apart from the material world or the tools apart from the natural environment. He points out that manufacturing was originally done by hand as a kind of manipulation. Gibson argues that learning to perceive an affordance is an essential part of socialization.

The theory of affordances introduces a "value-rich ecological object". Affordances cannot be described within the value-neutral language of physics, but rather introduces notions of benefits and injuries to someone. An affordance captures this beneficial/injurious aspect of objects and relates them to the animal for whom they are well/ill-suited. During childhood development, a child learns to perceive not only the affordances for the self, but also how those same objects furnish similar affordances to another. A child can be introduced to the conventional meaning of an object by manipulating which objects command attention and demonstrating how to use the object through performing its central function. By learning how to use an artifact, a child “enters into the shared practices of society” as when they learn to use a toilet or brush their teeth. And so, by learning the affordances, or conventional meaning of an artifact, children learn the artifact's social world and further, become a member of that world.

Anderson, Yamagishi and Karavia (2002) found that merely looking at an object primes the human brain to perform the action the object affords.

== As perceived action possibilities ==
In 1988, Donald Norman appropriated the term affordances in the context of Human–Computer Interaction to refer to just those action possibilities that are readily perceivable by an actor. This new definition of "action possibilities" has now become synonymous with Gibson's work, although Gibson himself never made any reference to action possibilities in any of his writing. Through Norman's book The Design of Everyday Things, this interpretation was popularized within the fields of HCI, interaction design, and user-centered design. It makes the concept dependent not only on the physical capabilities of an actor, but also on their goals, beliefs, and past experiences. If an actor steps into a room containing an armchair and a softball, Gibson's original definition of affordances allows that the actor may throw the chair and sit on the ball, because this is objectively possible. Norman's definition of (perceived) affordances captures the likelihood that the actor will sit on the armchair and throw the softball. Effectively, Norman's affordances "suggest" how an object may be interacted with. For example, the size, shape, and weight of a softball make it perfect for throwing by humans, and it matches their past experience with similar objects, as does the shape and perceivable function of an armchair for sitting. The focus on perceived affordances is much more pertinent to practical design problems, which may explain its widespread adoption.

Norman later explained that this restriction of the term's meaning had been unintended, and in his 2013 update of The Design of Everyday Things, he added the concept "signifiers". In the digital age, designers were learning how to indicate what actions were possible on a smartphone's touchscreen, which didn't have the physical properties that Norman intended to describe when he used the word "affordances".

Designers needed a word to describe what they were doing, so they chose affordance. What alternative did they have? I decided to provide a better answer: signifiers. Affordances determine what actions are possible. Signifiers communicate where the action should take place. We need both.

However, the definition from his original book has been widely adopted in HCI and interaction design, and both meanings are now commonly used in these fields.

Following Norman's adaptation of the concept, affordance has seen a further shift in meaning where it is used as an uncountable noun, referring to the easy discoverability of an object or system's action possibilities, as in "this button has good affordance". This in turn has given rise to use of the verb afford – from which Gibson's original term was derived – that is not consistent with its dictionary definition (to provide or make available): designers and those in the field of HCI often use afford as meaning "to suggest" or "to invite".

The different interpretations of affordances, although closely related, can be a source of confusion in writing and conversation if the intended meaning is not made explicit and if the word is not used consistently. Even authoritative textbooks can be inconsistent in their use of the term.

When affordances are used to describe information and communications technology (ICT) an analogy is created with everyday objects with their attendant features and functions. Yet, ICT's features and functions derive from the product classifications of its developers and designers. This approach emphasizes an artifact’s convention to be wholly located in how it was designed to be used. In contrast, affordance theory draws attention to the fit of the technology to the activity of the user and so lends itself to studying how ICTs may be appropriated by users or even misused. One meta-analysis reviewed the evidence from a number of surveys about the extent to which the Internet is transforming or enhancing community. The studies showed that the internet is used for connectivity locally as well as globally, although the nature of its use varies in different countries. It found that internet use is adding on to other forms of communication, rather than replacing them.

== Mechanisms and conditions framework of affordances ==
Jenny L. Davis introduced the mechanisms and conditions framework of affordances in a 2016 article and 2020 book. The mechanisms and conditions framework shifts the orienting question from what technologies afford to how technologies afford, for whom and under what circumstances? This framework deals with the problem of binary application and presumed universal subjects in affordance analyses. The mechanisms of affordance indicate that technologies can variously request, demand, encourage, discourage, refuse, and allow social action, conditioned on users' perception, dexterity, and cultural and institutional legitimacy in relation to the technological object.

This framework adds specificity to affordances, focuses attention on relationality, and centralizes the role of values, politics, and power in affordance theory. The mechanisms and conditions framework is a tool of both socio-technical analysis and socially aware design.

== Three categories ==
William Gaver divided affordances into three categories: perceivable, hidden, and false.

- A false affordance is an apparent affordance that does not have any real function, meaning that the actor perceives possibilities for action that are nonexistent. A good example of a false affordance is a placebo button.
- Affordance is said to be hidden when there are possibilities for action, but these are not perceived by the actor. For example, it is not apparent from looking at a shoe that it could be used to open a wine bottle, but such a feat is possible by placing the bottle into the shoe and tapping it repeatedly against a wall until the cork starts to be pushed out.
- Affordance is said to be perceivable when there is information available such that the actor perceives and can then act upon the existing affordance.

This means that, when affordances are perceivable, they offer a direct link between perception and action, and, when affordances are hidden or false, they can lead to mistakes and misunderstandings. However, given the consequences, acting on false affordances with improvised actions in realizing that perceived real function can lead to emergence of new or hidden affordances.

== Affordance in robotics ==
Problems in robotics indicate that affordance is not only a theoretical concept from psychology. In object grasping and manipulation, robots need to learn the affordance of objects in the environment, i.e., to learn from visual perception and experience (a) whether objects can be manipulated, (b) to learn how to grasp an object, and (c) to learn how to manipulate objects to reach a particular goal. As an example, the hammer can be grasped, in principle, with many hand poses and approach strategies, but there is a limited set of effective contact points and their associated optimal grip for performing the goal.

== Fire safety ==
In the context of fire safety, affordances are the perceived and actual properties of objects and spaces that suggest how they can be used during an emergency. For instance, well-designed signage, clear pathways, and accessible exits afford quick evacuation. By understanding and applying affordance principles, designers can create environments that intuitively guide occupants towards safety, reduce evacuation time, and minimize the risk of injury during a fire. Incorporating affordance-based design in building layouts, emergency equipment placement, and evacuation procedures ensures that users can effectively interact with their surroundings under stressful conditions, ultimately improving overall fire safety. This theory has been applied to select best design for several evacuation systems using data from physical experiments and virtual reality experiments.

== Affordances in language education ==
Based on Gibson’s conceptualization of affordances as both the good and bad that the environment offers animals, affordances in language learning are both the opportunities and challenges that learners perceive of their environment when learning a language. Affordances, which are both learning opportunities or inhibitions, arise from the semiotic budget of the learning environment, which allows language to evolve. Positive affordances, or learning opportunities, are only effective in developing learner's language when they perceive and actively interact with their surroundings. Negative affordances, on the other hand, are crucial in exposing the learners’ weaknesses for teachers, and the learners themselves, to address their moment-to-moment needs in their learning process.

However, in recent years the concept of affordance has been overly extended by many scholars beyond its ecological understanding. Norman’s (1988) introduction of affordance in the field of design contributed to the popularization of the concept, but at the same time it also led to a reductionist tendency and function creep, when affordance was often identified with the “availability features” of technology or software, as he later acknowledged and sought to correct with the concept of “signifiers”. Some educational researchers and philosophers criticize this tendency, arguing that it undermines the philosophical nature of affordance, turning the concept of human–environment relations into a technical label in education.

To overcome this collapse into triviality, some approaches have reaffirmed the relational and multidimensional nature of affordance. Van Lier (2004) develops the concept of “semiotic budget,” emphasizing that learners can only make use of affordances when they recognize and exploit signs in the learning environment. Davis (2016, 2020) proposes that affordances are never neutral but are always shaped by political, social, and cultural factors. In parallel, Rietveld and Kiverstein (2014) develop the concept of “landscapes of affordances,” describing networks of action opportunities that vary depending on embodied capacities and contexts. In this context.

Affordance in Action by Quang N. Nguyen (2022)

In 2022, Quang N. Nguyen introduces the concept of affordance-in-interaction in the field of Education. This model is later referred to as affordance-in-action. Accordingly, an affordance is not the environment or an ecology itself, yet it cannot come into being or operate independently of the relational conditions through which an environment or an ecology becomes meaningful for action. Affordances are understood as relational possibilities for action that emerge through interactions between individuals and their environments. The process begins when an individual apprehends an object or event (identified as firstness), interprets its significance and potential uses through semiosis (secondness), and anticipates possible actions and their consequences. These possibilities inform subsequent decisions and actions, which may, in turn, reshape the individual's relationship with the environment. Affordances are therefore conceptualized as dynamic, context-dependent, and adaptive processes rather than fixed properties of objects.

This account also extends affordance formation to interpersonal interactions. When another individual observes, participates in, or discusses an existing interaction, the participants' interpretations and perceived possibilities for action may become coordinated. Such synchronization can generate additional opportunities for action, constituting an interpersonal dimension of affordance development described in the proposed framework as thirdness.

Also, Nguyen N. Quang (2025) proposes a five-dimensional framework of affordances including (1) perceptibility, (2) valence, (3) compositionality, (4) normativity, and (5) intentionality. According to this framework, an affordance becomes a learning opportunity only when it is simultaneously perceived by the learner, valued, combined with other affordances, situated in social norms, and actualized by an intention to act. These dimensions do not exist in isolation but operate as a dynamic relational structure: perception opens up potential, value guides participation, association connects opportunities, norms limit the scope of validity, and intention turns potential into practice. The five-dimensional framework is seen as an attempt to expand the concept of affordance in language education, against the tendency to reduce it to its instrumental function. It shows that language learning is not simply about exploiting the features of technology, but a process of negotiation, meaning assignment, and action in a complex socio-cultural space, where affordances are both open and limited (Nguyen, 2022; Van Lier, 2004; Davis, 2020). Nguyen’s contribution lies in its level of integration and its ability to overcome the reductionism that has dominated many understandings of affordance in language education. If Van Lier (2000, 2004) focuses on the semiotic budget as a form of semiotic resource, Norman (1988, 2013) narrows affordance to perceived action possibilities and then to signifiers that are more instrumental in design, Davis (2016, 2020) analyzes affordance through mechanisms–conditions with a socio-political focus, and Rietveld and Kiverstein (2014) emphasize the landscape of affordances as a relational field associated with embodied capacities, then Nguyen’s (2022) five-dimensional framework simultaneously integrates multiple dimensions. In this way, the ecological advocates of affordance theory both critique reductionism and the phenomenon of functional creep when affordances are reduced to merely “technological features,” and seek to restore affordances to their true socio–philosophical–relational nature.

== See also ==
- Action-specific perception – Psychological theory on perception
- Activity theory – Soviet psychological framework
- Adaptive unconscious – Psychological theory
- Ambient optic array – Structured arrangement of light with respect to a point of observation
- Architectural exaptation – Practice of repurposing architectural elements
- Cognitive ecology – Branch of ecology studying cognition in social and natural contexts
- Default effect – Tendency to accept the default option
- Design – Plan for the construction of an object or system
- Design thinking – Processes by which design concepts are developed
- Ecological psychology – Scientific study
- Embodied cognition – Interdisciplinary theory
- Enactivism – Philosophical concept
- Exaptation – Function of trait, shifted by evolution
- Form follows function – Design philosophy of 19th–20th centuries
- Phenomenology (architecture) – Philosophical study of architecture
- Prejudice from an evolutionary perspective – View that prejudice has a functional utility in evolutionary processes
- Postcognitivism – Movements in cognitive science critical of cognitivism
- Situated cognition – Hypothesis that knowing is inseparable from doing
- Social affordance
- Spandrel (biology) – Evolutionary byproduct of some other characteristic
- Subconscious – Part of the mind that is not currently of focal awareness
- Temporary appropriation – Realisation of an activity in a public space for which it was not designed
- The Design of Everyday Things (book) – 1988 book by Donald Norman
- Unconscious mind – Mental processes not available to introspection
- Usability – Capacity of a system for its users to perform tasks
