= Alessandro Melis =

Italian architect (born 1969)

- Born: Alessandro Melis; June 7, 1969 (age 55); Cagliari, Italy
- Citizenship: Italian
- Education: Università degli Studi di Firenze
- Occupation: Architect • Art Curator • Professor
- Employer(s): Italian National Pavilion at the 17th Venice Biennale, University of Portsmouth
- Awards: Ambassador of Italian Design 2020 by ADI

Alessandro Melis (born 7 June 1969) is an Italian architect and the curator of the Italian National Pavilion at the 17th Venice Biennale. He is also currently a professor of architecture and the inaugural endowed chair of the New York Institute of Technology.

== Career ==
Alessandro Melis was born on 7 June 1969 in Cagliari, the largest city in the island of Sardinia in Italy. Melis received his Doctor of Architecture degree from the University of Florence in 1995.

In 1996, he founded Heliopolis 21, a multi-awarded architecture practice based in Italy, Germany, and the UK. The SR1938 Institute of the University of Pisa, the Stella Maris Hospital and the Auditorium of Sant'Anna, inaugurated by the president of the Italian Republic, Sergio Mattarella, are acknowledged both in scholar publications and in popular magazines as examples of excellence in sustainable design. The recognition of Alessandro's research is corroborated by a record of over 150 peer review journal and book publications (including practice based research outputs) such as the seminal monograph on Alessandro Gherardesca, pivotal researches on the Algerian El Houma, in collaboration with Yazid Khemri, Temporary Appropriation, with Antonio Lara Hernandez, and by as many citations.

In 2017, Alessandro Melis and Steffen Lehmann created the interdisciplinary project CRUNCH: Climate Resilient Urban Nexus Choices: Operationalising the Food-Water-Energy Nexus. This is a research project funded by Horizon 2020, Belmont Forum Belmont Forum, ESRC and other funding bodies. Alessandro Melis is leading the project on behalf of the University of Portsmouth, where he is professor of architecture innovation.

Appointed by the Italian Government in 2019, he follows the previous curators Mario Cucinella (2018) and Tamassociati (2016), as curator of the Italian Pavilion.

In 2020, he is appointed Ambassador of Italian Design in Paris, by Adi (Associazione Disegno Industriale) and the Italian Mnistery of Foreign Affairs.

Alessandro Melis is the current IDC Foundation Endowed Chair at the New York Institute of Technology. Previously, he was director of the International Cluster for Sustainable Cities at the University of Portsmouth, and the head of Postgraduate engagement at the school of Architecture and Planning of the University of Auckland. He has also been invited as a keynote speaker at the China Academy of Art, the Museum of Modern Art, the University of Cambridge, TEDx, the Italian Institute of Culture in London, the NZ Cycling Conference, the Foster Foundation (as an academic staff member), and the UNESCO Headquarters in Paris.

Alessandro Melis is acknowledged, together with Telmo Pievani, for introducing the concept of Exaptation in Architecture. His work was the object of several exhibitions and of a recent monograph (Rome, 2020) authored by several scholars of the universities of Palermo and Bari and edited by Francesco Fallacara Chirico, titled "Alessandro Melis, Utopic Real World.

== Awards ==
He has been nominated as an ambassador of Italian Design 2020 by ADI and the Italian Ministry of Foreign Affairs.

== Publications ==
- Melis, A. (2021). Periferia e pregiudizio. Bordeaux Edizioni. https://www.bordeauxedizioni.it/prodotto/periferia-e-pregiudizio/
- Melis, Alessandro; Lara-Hernandez, Jose Antonio; Thompson, James, eds. (2020). Temporary Appropriation in Cities. doi:10.1007/978-3-030-32120-8. ISBN 978-3-030-32119-2. S2CID 209331059.
- Melis, Alessandro (2020). ZombieCity. Strategie urbane di sopravvivenza agli zombie e alla crisi climatica. D Editore. ISBN 978-88-94830-49-1.
- Lara-Hernandez, Jose Antonio; Coulter, Claire M.; Melis, Alessandro (April 2020). "Temporary appropriation and urban informality: Exploring the subtle distinction". Cities. 99 102626. doi:10.1016/j.cities.2020.102626. S2CID 214138622.
- Raimo, Antonino Di; Lehmann, Steffen; Melis, Alessandro (2020). Informality through Sustainability: Urban Informality Now. Routledge. ISBN 978-1-000-33575-0.
- Integrated Science. Vol. 1. 2021. doi:10.1007/978-3-030-65273-9. ISBN 978-3-030-65272-2. S2CID 235442301.
- Melis, Alessandro (3 May 2019). "Leonardo da Vinci designed an ideal city that was centuries ahead of its time". The Conversation.
- Melis, Alessandro (2019). "The Introduction of Nature in the Austrian Radicals Practice". Planning Cities with Nature. Cities and Nature. pp. 45–63. doi:10.1007/978-3-030-01866-5_4. ISBN 978-3-030-01865-8. S2CID 150926275.
- Melis, Alessandro (10 January 2019). "Stadiums aren't fated to disrepair and disuse – history shows they can change with the city". The Conversation.
- Melis, A., & Stumbles, L. J., (2018). How to build cities and destroy motorways: a radical perspective on environmental design. D Editore. http://deditore.com/prodotto/how-to-build-the-cities-and-destroy-motorways/
- Melis, Alessandro; Gatley, Julia (2018). "A romantic in Tuscany: Alessandro Gherardesca and the transformation of Pisa's Piazza del Duomo". Cogent Social Sciences. 4 (1) 1487256. doi:10.1080/23311886.2018.1487256. S2CID 59330351.
- Auer, Thomas; Melis, Alessandro; Aimar, Fabrizio, eds. (2017). "Introduction to the disruptive technology in the teaching of environmental design". Disruptive Technologies. Wolters Kluwer Italia. ISBN 978-88-5981651-5.
- Melis, Alessandro; Davis, Michael John; Balaara, Allan (2017). "The history and invocation of the Arche in Austrian Radical architecture thinking". Cogent Social Sciences. 3 (1) 1368366. doi:10.1080/23311886.2017.1368366. S2CID 56400303.
- Melis, A., & Ijatuyi, O. (2015). Regeneration of the historical villages of Tuscany, through conservation and tourism development strategies. In Y. Xiujing (Ed.), 中国美术学院建筑遗产保护国际论坛论文集: Proceedings of the Architecture Forum of the China Academy of Arts (pp. 35–40). China Academy of Arts Publishing House. https://web.archive.org/web/20200125034728/http://www.caajiuye.com/company-157924.html
- Melis, A., & Gasperini, M. (2014). Shining Dark Territories: 100 thoughts of architecture. Edizioni ETS.
- Melis, Alessandro; Swenson, Robert; Lewis, Diane (2013). "Good Morning, Babylon: The Cathedral Is a Movie". Framework: The Journal of Cinema and Media. 54 (1): 82–84. doi:10.1353/frm.2013.0006. S2CID 191453364. Project MUSE 496080.
- Melis, A. (2009). L'Architettura Delle Chiese. In S. Sodi (Ed.), Giovanni Michelucci e la Chiesa italiana (pp. 65–84). Edizioni San Paolo.
- Melis, A., & Melis, G. L. (2002). Architettura romantica. In G. Morolli (Ed.), Alessandro Gherardesca, architetto toscano del Romanticismo (Pisa, 1777-1852)
- Melis, A., & Melis, G. L. (2002). I teorici dell'architettura illuminata. In G. Morolli (Ed.), Alessandro Gherardesca, architetto toscano del Romanticismo (Pisa, 1777-1852)
- Melis, A., & Melis, G. L. (2002). La Piazza del Duomo di Pisa. In G. Morolli (Ed.), Alessandro Gherardesca, Architetto Toscano del Romanticismo (Pisa, 1777-1852) Edizioni ETS.
- Melis, A., & Melis, G. L. (1996). Architettura Pisana: dal Granducato Lorenese all'unità d'Italia. Edizioni ETS.
