= Social affordance =

Social affordance is a type of affordance. It refers to the properties of an object or environment that permit social actions. Social affordance is most often used in the context of a social technology such as Wiki, Chat and Facebook applications and refers to sociotechnical affordances. Social affordances emerge from the coupling between the behavioral and cognitive capacities of a given organism and the objective properties of its environment.

Social affordances – or more accurately sociotechnical affordances – refer as reciprocal interactions between a technology application, its users, and its social context. These social interactions include users' responses, social accessibility and society related changes. Social affordances are not synonymous with mere factual, statistical frequency; on the contrary, the social normality of primitive forms of coordination can become normative, even in primate societies. A good example clarifies social affordance as follows: " A wooden bench is supposed to have a sit affordance. A hiker who has walked for hours and passes the wooden bench on a walk along small country roads might perceive the sit affordance of the wooden bench as a function of the degree of fatigue. A very tired hiker will sit on the wooden bench but will not lie down (unless the wooden bench also has a lie affordance). A still fit hiker, however, might not even pick up on the sit affordance of the bench and pass it. The wooden bench is in that case no more than a piece of wood with no further meaning."

== Affordance ==
Affordance is a term introduced by psychologist James J. Gibson. In his 1979 book "The Ecological Approach to Visual Perception", he writes: "The affordances of the environment are what it offers the animal, what it provides or furnishes, either for good or ill. The verb to afford is found in the dictionary, but the noun affordance is not. I have made it up. I mean by it something that refers to both the environment and the animal in a way that no existing term does. It implies the complementarily of the animal and the environment"

Possibilities for motor action — or what Gibson termed affordances — depend on the match between environmental conditions and actors' physical characteristics. An example can clarify this term; when a person goes through a door, either the person is thin enough or the door is wide enough to let the person get in. Afforda nces are relational properties; they are neither in the environment nor in the perceiver, but are derived from the ecological relationship between the perceiver and the perceived so that the perceiver and perceived are logically interdependent. This psychological term then evolves for uses in many fields: perceptual psychology, cognitive psychology, environmental psychology, industrial design, human–computer interaction, interaction design, instructional design, education and artificial intelligence.

According to Quang N. Nguyen (2025), the concept of affordance needs to be expanded from the perceptual-only realm to the neuro-ecological plane. Affordance is not just "what the environment allows," but the emergence of meaning and action in the process of tripling and attunement between the brain, the body, and the world. In this understanding, affordance is an ecological negotiation of intelligibility where the subject and the environment co-construct the conditions for perception, value, and action. Quang N. Nguyen argues that each affordance exists in a multi-layered ecology: neural, interpersonal, and cultural within a five-dimensional framework: perceptibility, valence, conpositionality, intentionality and normality. These layers are linked through "affordance uptake trajectories," which describe how people gradually change how they see, understand, and use the possibilities that the world opens up. Thus, affordance has a temporal, normative, and ethical dimension: it not only tells us what we can do, but also suggests what we should or should not do in a shared world. Nguyen's conception transforms affordance into an epistemic ecology where learning about the world is no longer about accumulating knowledge, but about fine-tuning perception and sensitivity and orienting action in relation to the environment. Affordance is thus part of the ecological umwelt, where the brain and the understanding of the world transform together to open up new cognitive and ethical possibilities.

== The evolution of social affordances ==
The term affordance is first used in human-computer interaction in the 1980s by Norman with the term perceived affordance. Relevant publications were: Gaver's seminal articles on technology affordance in 1991, affordances of media spaces in 1992, affordances for interaction, and then Bradner's notion of social affordance, where social affordances are action possibilities for social behavior. Social affordance is at first used in Computer Supported Collaboration Learning experiments. Computer support collaboration learning applications and users' interactions are the major issue in social affordance. Social affordances are properties of Computer Supported Collaboration Learning environments which act as social-contextual facilitators relevant for the learner's social interactions. This term afterwards applies to other human-computer interactions including human cognition responses, visual perceptions and it also refers to the ecological relationship between human and computers.

== Social affordances in human-robot interaction ==
Social affordance in the context of human-robot interaction refers to the action possibilities offered by the presence of a set of social agents. Though not frequently used in the human-robot interaction community, except for Uyanik et al. (2013), Shu et al. (2016), and Shu et al. (2017), social affordance pertains to the many human-robot interaction problems and studies.

== Social affordances in interaction design ==
Affordance firstly refers to designs that offering visual perception or cognition of its users' insight usages of the designs. The designs in software then accept the idea of affordance and expand the concept to social affordance in human and computer interactions. In social affordance, they offer possibilities to act from the users. The ecological relationships from users and designs build the social affordance in interaction design. For example, hats are for putting on heads. Mailing boxes are for letters.

== Social affordances and human-computer interaction ==
Human-computer interactions were proposed by the effects that arise from the human and computer interactions in computer assisted education software. It later expands its usage to any social interaction between computer related applications and its users. In computer assisted education software, social affordance is evaluated with five characteristics: Accessibility, Contextualisation, Professional learning, Communities, Learning design, Adaptability. Social affordance in interactive website also exists. Evaluations of social affordances in websites have focused on some of the following features: Tagging, User Profiles, Activity Streams, Comments, Ratings and Votes. These social affordances allow users to be aware of other users' opinions, thoughts and feedback and, in so doing, help to engage users and build social connections.

== Factors that influence social affordance ==
- Culture: Culture is an important factor that influence social affordance. Vatrapu support his view that culture difference plays a prominent role that influence social affordance. He designs experiments to compare differences between Western and Chinese users in computer support collaboration learning applications. If we consider culture as an attentional system that gives individuals the incentive to recognize some social affordances as worthy of being acted upon, it is no wonder that natives "see" the analogical mappings that make sense of their society as a whole without being able to justify them.
- Habit: Different habitual backgrounds adapt to different social affordances. However, different habit from local subculture can change to global consumption collective by the internet connections.
- Age: In cellphones, big display design for the elderly accounts for the social affordance difference for age. Social affordance in website or software design must include age related consideration.
- Gender: Analysis of perceptual bias between two gender exists. With perceptual bias, gender plays a dominant role in social affordance.

== Types of social software ==
There is much social software in web, summary as follows:

Multi-player online gaming environments / virtual worlds

- Multi-User Dungeons (MUDs); Massively-Multiplayer Online Games (MMOGs) such as Second Life, Active Worlds, World of Warcraft, EverQuest

Discourse facilitation systems

- Synchronous: Instant messaging (IM, e.g. Windows Live Messenger, AOL Instant Messenger, Yahoo Instant Messenger, Google Chat, ICQ, Skype); chat
- Asynchronous: Email; bulletin boards; discussion boards; moderated commenting systems (e.g. K5, Slashdot, Plastic)

Content management systems

- Blogs; wikis; document management systems (e.g. Plone); web annotation systems

Product development systems

- SourceForge; Savane; LibreSource

Peer-to-peer file sharing systems

- BitTorrent; Gnutella; Napster; Limewire; Kazaa; Morpheus; eMule; iMesh

Selling/purchasing management systems

- eBay

Learning management systems

- Blackboard/WebCT; ANGEL; Moodle; LRN; Sakai; ATutor; Claroline; Dokeos

Relationship management systems

- MySpace; Friendster; Facebook; Orkut; eHarmony; Bebo

Syndication systems

- List-servs; RSS aggregators

Distributed classification systems ("folksonomies")

- Social bookmarking: del.icio.us; Digg; Furl
- Social cataloguing (books): LibraryThing; Neighborrow; Shelfari
  - (music): RateYourMusic.com; Discogs
  - (movies / DVDs): Flixster; DVDSpot; DVD Aficionado
  - (scholarly citations): BibSonomy; Bibster; refbase; CiteULike; Connotea
  - Other: Flickr

== Social affordances trends in social software ==
- Wiki- Web 2.0 technologies (e.g., Wikis, blogs, social bookmarking) are being used as a tool to support collaborative learning among students. Wiki is an effective form to support collaborative learning practices. Wiki enables students to engage effectively in learning with peers. The affordance of Wiki as a learning tool attracts educators' interests frequently.
- Computer-supported collaborative learning- The term Social affordance appears in computer supported collaborative learning firstly. Many articles discuss social affordance in computer supported collaborative learning. Social affordance for effective computer supported collaborative learning is a crucial issue for both educators and software developers.
- Facebook- Cross-case analysis shows that Facebook has pedagogical, social, and technical affordances for teaching and learning. Computer-mediated Communication technologies like Facebook aid in building and strengthening social networks Scholars have noted that affordance imply that the term "Social" cannot account for technological features of a social network platform alone. Hence, the level of sociability should determined by the actual performances of its users. Different studies on Facebook for social affordance may appear abundantly in the future.
- Blogging- "Three qualities—reader input, fixity, and juxtaposition—can't claim to be a complete or definitive list of blogging's journalistic affordances. But they offer enough of a scaffold to let us consider what makes blogs blog-like."
- Google Search- The social affordance in Google Search induce debates on "what content should appear?" and "how it should rank?". The social affordance in Google Search elicit questions on not only "how Google Search should be used?", but also "what if it is not used?".
- Web filtering- How the rating and recommendation information are available to the user? In the article Procters suggest: nominal rating; frequency; sequential accountability; distributional accountability; sources; topical coherence as measured by inter-document text similarity; temporal coherence are key factors relevant to social affordance in web filtering.
