= Co-option (disambiguation) =

Co-option or cooption is a process of appointing members to a group, or an act of absorbing or assimilating.

Co-option or cooption may also refer to:

- In evolutionary biology, co-option or exaptation is a reuse of an adaptation for a new function.

== See also ==
- Cultural appropriation
