= Prejudice from an evolutionary perspective =

View that prejudice has a functional utility in evolutionary processes

Some evolutionary theorists consider prejudice as having functional utility in evolutionary process. A number of evolutionary psychologists in particular posit that human psychology, including emotion and cognition, is influenced by evolutionary processes. These theorists argue that although psychological variation appears between individuals, the majority of our psychological mechanisms are adapted specifically to solve recurrent problems in our evolutionary history, including social problems.

For example, James J. Gibson, a founder of ecological psychology, believes that human evolutionary success is enhanced by the ability to analyze social costs and benefits so that humans can recognize and functionally respond to threats and opportunities, and that errors in judgment will be biased toward minimizing costs to reproductive fitness. In other words, human responses to social stimuli proceed from adaptations that motivate action in order to take advantage of opportunities and avoid or confront threats. Some proponents of this perspective believe that these responses can be measured by implicit association tests.

Unconscious negative reactions are often referred to as prejudice, but prejudices are more contextually rich than simple reactions, which may involve discrete emotions in an evolutionary perspective. In this perspective, evolved biases may have implications for both beneficial or harmful expressions of stigma, prejudice, or discriminatory behavior in post-industrial societies. Some common biases include those related to sex, age, and race.

== Recognizing threats and opportunities ==
According to James J. Gibson, humans perceive their environment in terms of affordances. Different animals and objects afford different context-dependent actions. For instance, the same trait may afford both costs and benefits depending on the who carries it, the social and environmental contexts, and the relative affordances or vulnerabilities of the one interacting with the object. Although affordances are relative, they are constant given the same context and provide a strong stimulus for adaptations to recognize and respond to both threats and opportunities.

== Error management theory and the smoke detector principle ==
In their Error Management Theory (see also Adaptive Bias), Martie Haselton and David Buss suggested that judgments about opportunities and threats, in cases of uncertainty, would consistently err toward minimizing potential costs to reproductive fitness. Smoke detectors have often been used as an analogy for how threat mitigating adaptations might function. Smoke detectors are designed to be overly-sensitive to the presence of smoke so that they don’t fail to respond in case of an actual fire. For this reason, they often give false alarms. However, if smoke detectors are too sensitive, we are likely to either turn them off or become desensitized to their warnings. The smoke detector principle holds that adaptations function similarly, erring on the side of caution. False alarms may be common, but overall costs are minimized.

== Evolved prejudice ==
Prejudice is often associated with discrimination, which, in the colloquial sense, means the active and explicit exclusion and derogation of a group based on preconceived and/or unfounded judgments. Although this type of discrimination certainly exists, an evolutionary perspective does not necessarily justify its presence. However, discriminate sociality is an integral part of group living which is essential to reproductive success in an evolutionary perspective, as different individuals afford different threats and opportunities. For instance, indiscriminate cooperation is inherently unstable because it is easily invaded by cheats and free-riders. Thus, cooperative groups are seen as needing mechanisms to recognize and punish non-cooperators. A lack of discrimination in other areas of human activity, such as pathogen avoidance and intergroup conflict, is similarly detrimental from an evolutionary perspective, which holds that indiscriminate social actors will generally have lower fitness than those who are able to respond more effectively to the affordances of others.

== Emotion and prejudice ==
In 1872, Charles Darwin published The Expression of the Emotions in Man and Animals and theorized that humans had universal emotions that functioned to motivate specific behaviors. Paul Ekman, in 1971, published cross-cultural research supporting Darwin’s predictions. People in both pre-literate and literate societies recognized distinct emotions (fear, anger, disgust, sadness, happiness, surprise), which Ekman suggested were universal and socially functional adaptations. Cottrell and Neuberg (2005) found that threats are functionally different for different individuals and predictably activate different emotions, which motivate unique behavioral responses.

== Common socio-functional prejudice ==
Since affordances are context dependent, and threats are often functionally distinct (e.g., threats of violence, disease, non-cooperation, threats to the functional efficiency of groups), some evolutionary theorists posit that these different types of threats likely provided distinct evolutionary pressures and activate different emotions, which in turn motivate different behaviors. Likewise, these functionally unique adaptations are understood to be activated by different cues for different people, as threats are not universal. Since false positives are costly, adaptations for threat avoidance, aversion, or confrontation are viewed by evolutionary theorists as being differentially activated based on threat vulnerability. In other words, an imminent threat would be more likely to trigger a prejudiced response than a threat where a person has time to analyze the nature of a threat and avoid a false positive. Much research has focused on the functional flexibility of prejudice. Selected examples are shown below.

=== Sexism ===
Haselton and Buss extended Robert Trivers parental investment theory to predict intrasexual mind-reading errors associated with female sexual intent and male commitment intent. This theory proposes that males and females have inherently different costs and benefits associated with parental investment because of their different physiology. Women lose reproductive opportunities and incur large energy costs during gestation. However, women are assured of parentage and can afford to invest more in individual offspring than males, for whom paternity is uncertain. As such, it is understood that women have incentives to be choosy about potential mates, balancing the benefits of good genes and potential paternal investment. Men, however, have incentives to act to minimize the costs associated with uncertain paternity by maximizing mating opportunities. Haselton and Buss found that women, on average, underestimated men's commitment intent, and men, on average, overestimated women's sexual intent. The authors suggested that such implicit biases may underpin intersexual prejudice, or sexism, and that these errors (prejudices) would be moderated by relative mate value, but little to no research has explored these predictions.

=== Ageism ===
Prejudices toward the elderly are common and may arise from perceptions of functionally distinct threats, e.g. disease, group efficiency. Some research found that individuals who felt more vulnerable to disease, both chronically and in experimentally primed conditions, were more likely to have implicit biases against the elderly, but these effects were moderated by cultural experience.

=== Racism and xenophobia ===
Some evolutionary theorists believe that encounters with different races were relatively rare in evolutionary history, and that humans do not have adaptations specific to race. However, it is theorized that encounters with out-groups were more common, and that these encounters likely had different consequences for men and women, specifically with respect to out-group men. Carlos Navarrete and colleagues found that race biases against out-group males were distinct for in-group men and women. Men's biases were motivated by aggression and social dominance, whereas women's biases were consistently motivated by fear of sexual coercion.

These findings are consistent with the predicted type of pressure imposed on men and women by outgroup men. For women, these biases are expected to be strongest when threats of coercion have the greatest potential fitness costs. Navarrete and colleagues found that race bias increased with increased conception risk, but maintain that "racism" on its face is not merely emotional nor based solely on preconception; rather, they argue that many of the biases felt by both the in-group and out-group are strongly predicated upon established cultural and social norms.

=== Flexible in-group categorization and prejudice ===
In the course of social interactions, humans often categorize each other by race, which has implications for the nature of interactions. However, research by evolutionary psychologists suggests that race categorization is either absent or reduced when more motivationally relevant grouping cues are apparent. For instance, Kurzban, Tooby and Cosmides found that when a subject identified as being part of the same group as a person of another race, perceptions based on race were either reduced or absent. The authors believe this could be evidence that prejudices associated with race can be overridden by cues of common group identity, and thus mitigate threats presented by members of out-groups. This may have implications for managing functionally distinct prejudices, many of which may be activated by apparent out-group status.

Prejudice toward individuals with disabilities has been melded across history by moral and social frameworks. In ancient and medieval societies, physical and cognitive differences were commonly interpreted as evidence of divine will, sin, or moral weakness. Individuals were often segregated or confined, with early institutions prioritizing containment over integration. According to the Minnesota Governor’s Council on Developmental Disabilities, these structures reflected fear of social disorder rather than concern for rehabilitation, reinforcing enduring patterns that positioned difference as a social risk.
