= Push-button =

Mechanism to control a machine or process

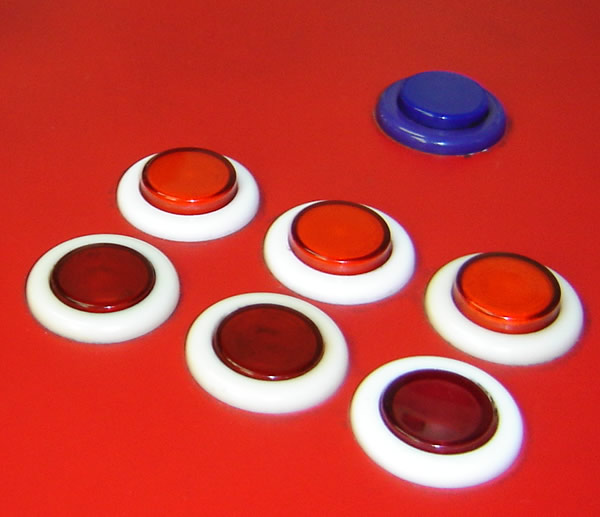
- Generic arcade game buttons
- Component type: Switch

Electronic symbol

A push-button (also spelled pushbutton) or simply button is a simple switch mechanism to control some aspect of a machine or a process. Buttons are typically made out of hard material, usually plastic or metal. The surface is usually flat or shaped to accommodate the human finger or hand, so as to be easily depressed or pushed. Buttons are most often biased switches, although many un-biased buttons (due to their physical nature) still require a spring to return to their un-pushed state.

Terms for the "pushing" of a button include pressing, depressing, mashing, slapping, hitting, and punching.

== Uses ==
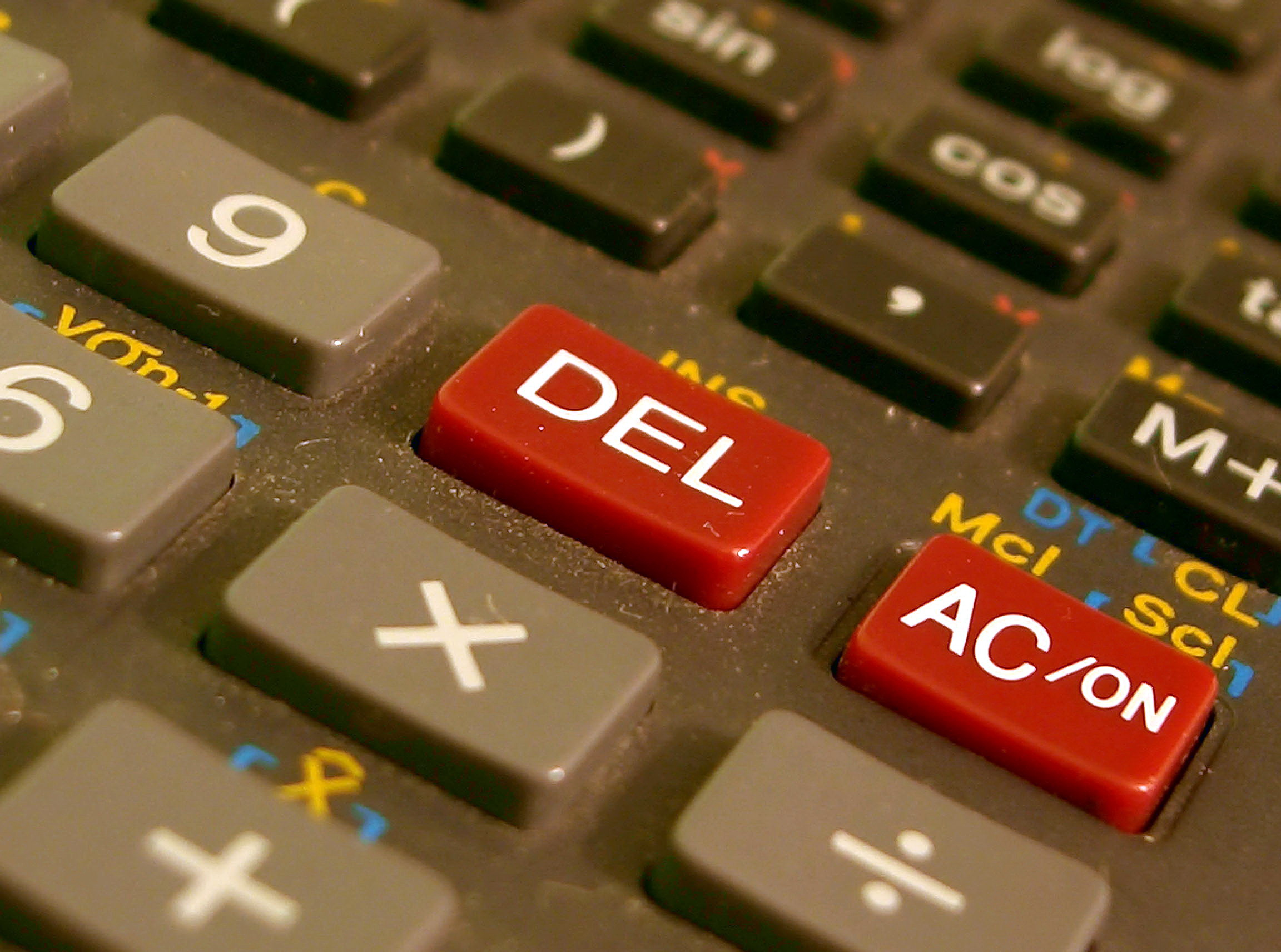
Buttons on a handheld calculator

Push-button for a crosswalk in use in Japan, 2022

The "push-button" has been utilized in calculators, push-button telephones, kitchen appliances, cars, and various other mechanical and electronic devices, home and commercial.

In industrial and commercial applications, push buttons can be connected together by a mechanical linkage so that the act of pushing one button causes the other button to be released. In this way, a stop button can "force" a start button to be released. This method of linkage is used in simple manual operations in which the machine or process has no electrical circuits for control.

=== Emergency stop buttons ===
A push-button used to facilitate the immediate stopping of a machine is often referred to as an emergency stop button. For increased safety, emergency stop buttons are mandated by the electrical code in many jurisdictions. For example, according to ISO 13850, emergency stop buttons must be colored red.

=== Scram switches ===
Buttons used at a nuclear power plant to drop control rods in event of a meltdown are known as "scram switches". The origins of the term 'scram' are unclear, with possibilities including an acronym coined by Enrico Fermi as well as the slang term scram, meaning "get out of here". Such buttons may be connected to other large scale functions such as automated shutdown procedures, complete facility power cuts, or fire suppression methods such as halon release.

== Accessibility ==
Push-buttons may have large heads (called mushroom heads) that add surface area for easy operation. This large mushroom shape can also be found in buttons for use with operators who need to wear gloves for their work and could not actuate a regular flush-mounted button.

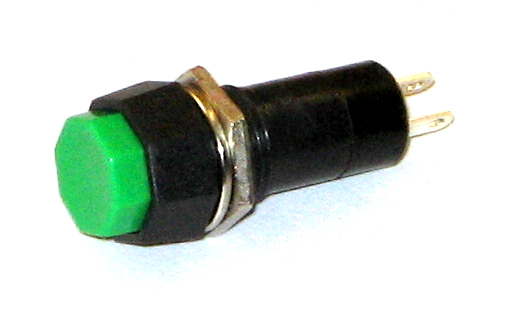
Button shaped as an octagon

As an aid for operators and users in industrial or commercial applications, a pilot light is commonly added to draw the attention of the user and to provide feedback if the button is pushed. Typically this light is included into the center of the pushbutton and a lens replaces the pushbutton hard center disk. The source of the energy to illuminate the light is not directly tied to the contacts on the back of the pushbutton but to the action the pushbutton controls. In this way a start button when pushed will cause the process or machine operation to be started and a secondary contact designed into the operation or process will close to turn on the pilot light and signify the action of pushing the button caused the resultant process or action to start.

To avoid an operator from pushing the wrong button in error, push-buttons are often color-coded to associate them with their function. Commonly used colors are red for stopping the machine or process and green for starting the machine or process.

== History ==
Push buttons were invented sometime in the late 19th century, certainly no later than 1880. The name came from the French word bouton (something that sticks out), rather than from the kind of buttons used on clothing. The initial public reaction was curiosity mixed with fear, some of which was due to widespread fear of electricity, which was a relatively new technology at the time.

== In popular culture ==
In popular culture, the phrase "the button" (sometimes capitalized) refers to a (usually fictional) button that a military or government leader could press to launch nuclear weapons.

Buttons have come to symbolize convenience and ease of access, with "at the push of a button" or "at the touch of a button" often used to signify that an item is readily available or an action can be taken immediately.

== See also ==
- Event-driven programming
- Button accordion
- Button (computing)
- Keyboard (computing)
- Panic button
- Placebo button
- Push-button telephone
- Reset button
- Shutter button
- Turbo button
