= El Houma =

Algerian neighborhoods with high degree of social solidarity

Lhouma is a term used in North Africa, to refer to a neighbourhood / quarter characterised by strong social relations between residents and the space in which they live and practice their daily life.

Lhouma has been in the centre of several sociologist studies, due to its importance in shaping and showcasing the lifestyle of Algerians It is equivalent to the contemporary concepts of sustainable community and socially sustainable neighbourhood that are based on local socio-cultural practices. It is a socio-spatial product defined by the fact of living, playing and socialising in a shared built environment, which in turn groups local residents around a common identity of belonging to the same of area of living.

Hence, Lhouma is not used to refer to any typical neighbourhood or area of living that only houses people, but it indicates an urban area in which frequent social use of space emanates high degree of social cohesion, solidarity, trust, intricate social ties, place attachment and sense of belonging.

== Etymology ==
The word Houma is specific to Maghribi Arabic and is only used in the Maghreb. "El" is the Arabic definite article equivalent to “the” in English, whereas, the word "Houma" originates from the Arabic word ‘HA-WA-MA’ meaning an environment; a circular perimeter within one’s field of vision. It also connotes a quarter, a section of a city, a main body, main part, density of an area.

The word ‘El Houma’ is used by residents of Algeria to refer to their area of living; the word is pronounced differently across the country, informed by the accent of each region. In Algiers, residents pronounce it ‘Houma’ or ‘Hûma’ which is the most common pronunciation, and both terms can be found in written archive that dates back to Ottoman era, whilst, people in the eastern and western parts of Algeria, pronounce it ‘Hawma’.

== Origin of el Houma ==
The origin of El Houma is believed to go back to the first settlements in Algiers, and evolved during the Medieval ages, where residential quarters were a place of production and reproduction of local society. At the time, the town was compact and formed of many enclosed quarters that were close-knit and inhabited by homogenous communities formed of people from the same tribe, family, religion, clan, profession (poetry, jewellery…), all of which contributed to create strong degree of social cohesion between residents, and intricate social ties. Social life in these quarters was intense as every Houma sustained itself through a moderate mix of uses to satisfy residents’ daily needs while also ensuring privacy and maintaining a separation between the hustle of public and private areas. Every Houma had the essential amenities nearby; its own mosque and bakery, Koran school, fountains, stalls, Hammam (bath) and a small market. Every Houma was under the administrative responsibility of a religious chief / qadis (judge) often called Sheikh, who was usually an old, noble and wise man from the quarter, acting as an informal government body; to solve problems and conflicts between people and give blessings for marriages, etc. The streets were constantly cleaned by residents, as they were a playground area for children, and social life in these quarters engendered a great sense of community as residents shared mutual rights and duties, and thus the term Houma was given to every neighbourhood that has strong social relations between residents and represented a sustainable way of life of people. Thus, the word for neighbourhood in Algeria was -and still is- ‘El Houma’ to refer to a neighbourhood characterised by such strong social relations between residentsand intense organic urban life.

== Significance and relevance of El Houma ==
Although El Houma has no administrative definition or official recognition in planning policies of Algeria, it constitutes an important component of the city’s organisation and a vital part in the lifestyle of people. In Algiers, the literal translation of wash hiya Houmtek? - Where do you live? - Is “which is your Houma?” In this regard, the term “Houma” refers to living together in an area. My Houma refers to one’s area of residence, and the relations and experiences they share with their neighbours and playmates. These social relations grow with local children and are strengthened through time and continuous social interaction. As adults, they recognise each other during gatherings and receptions, for example, when a member of El Houma gets married, usually he invites his neighbours (other members of his Houma) to share a meal and attend a ceremony. Similarly, when someone dies, members of el Houma show their support and solidarity by attending the funeral and gather around their house When People say they no longer have a Houma, is when they lose contact with their neighbours and friends in their area of residence and not when they are homeless, or when they move to a new neighbourhood and struggle to create social relations with their new neighbours.

El Houma is a local manifestation of social life through social use of urban spaces; members of El Houma share social relations, rights and duties and belong to a community that is based on neighbourhood relationships rather than just family ties. According to Khemri and Melis, members of El Houma feels a strong sense of belonging and allow themselves to use the space to practice their daily life and practice activities like chatting, resting, playing football, playing cards or dominos, informal street vending, occupying streets and public spaces to celebrate weddings.
