= Jürgen Brosius =

German molecular geneticist and evolutionary biologist

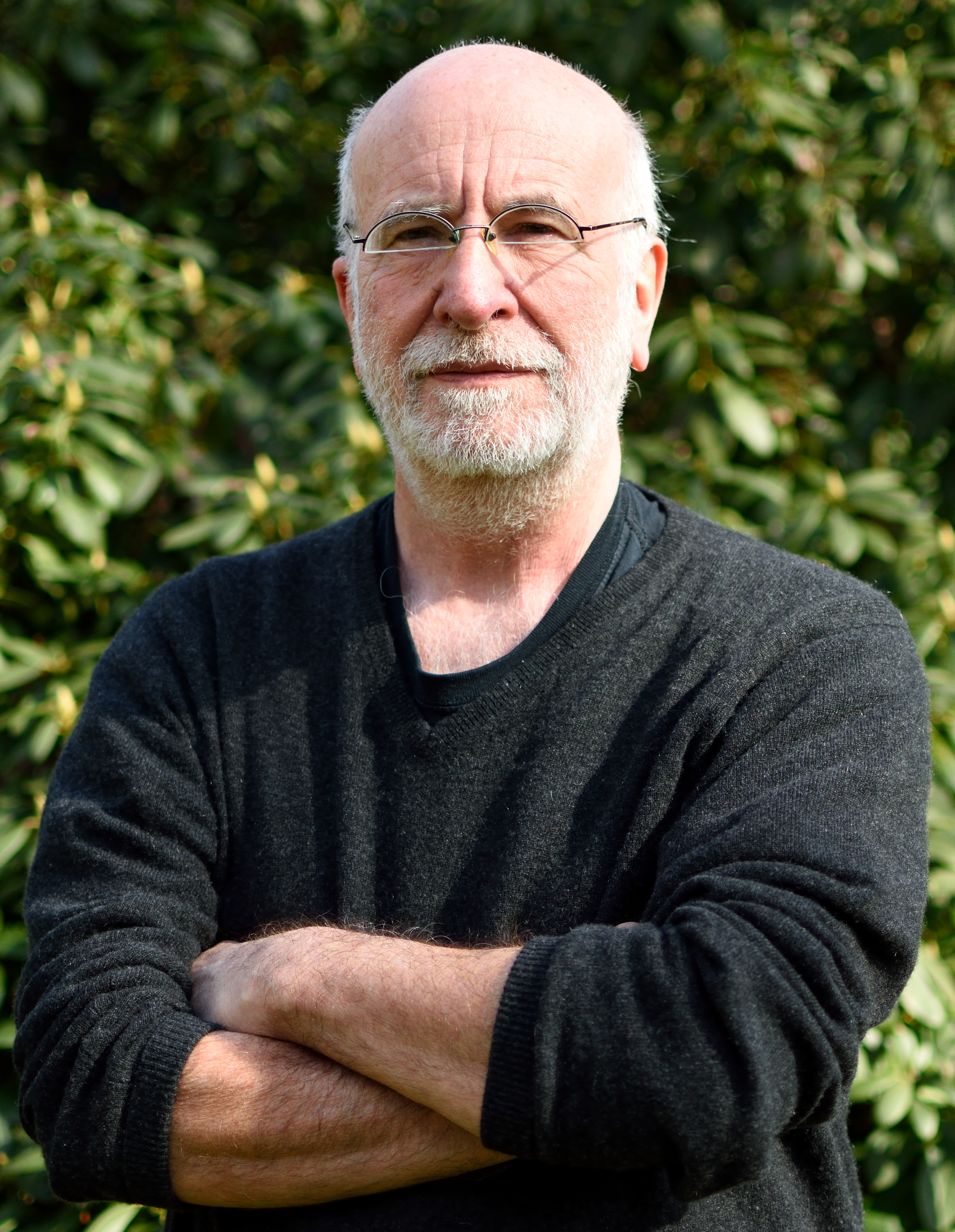
- Born: 1948 (age 77–78)
- Known for: sequencing ribosomal RNA, expression vectors for recombinant proteins, RNA biology, RNomics, role of retroposition in the evolution of genomes, genes, and gene modules
- Scientific career
- Fields: molecular genetics and evolutionary biology
- Workplaces: University of Münster

Jürgen Brosius (born 1948 in Saarbrücken) is a German molecular geneticist and evolutionary biologist. He was professor and director of the Institute of Experimental Pathology at the University of Münster. Some of his scientific contributions involve the first genetic sequencing of a ribosomal RNA operon, the design of plasmids for studying gene expression, expression vectors for high-level production of recombinant proteins and RNA, RNA biology, RNomics as well as the significance of retroposition for plasticity and evolution of genomes, genes and gene modules including regulatory sequences or elements.

== Biography ==
=== Early life and education ===
Brosius studied chemistry and pharmacy at the Goethe University of Frankfurt and in 1974 graduated and completed the Staatsexamen (state examination) in Pharmacy. Subsequently, he pursued his Ph.D. work in biochemistry and molecular biology at the Max Planck Institute for Molecular Genetics in Berlin Dahlem in which Heinz-Günter Wittmann was department head. While determining the primary structures of several E. coli ribosomal proteins, he developed manual micro-methods for isolating peptides using two-dimensional separation on cellulose thin layer plates (instead of using a series of chromatography columns) followed by dansyl-Edman degradation. This reduced the required protein material by one to two orders of magnitude towards the 100 nanomole range. This method was shortly thereafter superseded by automated protein sequencing operating in the low picomole range.

=== Postdoctoral fellowships ===
From 1977 to 1980, Brosius spent a postdoctoral fellowship supported by the Fogarty International Center in Harry F. Noller’s lab at the University of California, Santa Cruz. There, he sequenced the first large ribosomal RNAs via their genes utilizing the Maxam-Gilbert sequencing method. It took ~2.5 years to sequence the 7.5 kilobases encompassing the entire rrnB rRNA operon in addition to some flanking regions. Although the chemical method was cumbersome, sequences could be determined entirely void of errors.

During his stay at UCSC Brosius met visiting professor Carl Woese, who incited his interest in evolutionary thought and the power of molecular phylogenetic analysis.

His second postdoctoral fellowship (1980–1982), supported by the German Research Foundation, took him to the laboratory of Walter Gilbert, Nobel prize laureate in Chemistry (1980), at Harvard University. Here, Brosius began to develop plasmid vectors for the selection of promoters and terminators, as well as widely used vectors for the high-level expression of recombinant proteins in E. coli, often employing regulatory sequences or modules from the rRNA operon.

=== Faculty positions ===
In 1982, Brosius established his own laboratory at Columbia University College of Physicians and Surgeons as assistant professor partially funded by the Alfred P. Sloan Foundation and the Irma T. Hirschl Trust. In 1988, he moved with his research group to Mount Sinai School of Medicine as Associate Professor and in 1994 as full Professor and Director of the Institute of Experimental Pathology to the University of Münster, Germany. In the mid-nineties, he established a transgenic and gene targeting facility serving the entire campus and beyond by generating, for example, mouse models designed for the study of human genetic disorders.

== Scientific contributions ==
In the early 1980s, Brosius became interested in a small brain-specific RNA that was thought to be a waste product of a mechanism orchestrating the expression of genes by RNA polymerase III transcription of identifier sequence (ID) repetitive elements, classified as SINEs, short interspersed repeats, located in the introns of brain-specific genes by making chromatin accessible to RNA polymerase II. This attractive hypothesis was not tenable. Instead, the Brosius laboratory focused on this brain cytoplasmic BC1 RNA, cloned it as cDNA by developing a method for generating cDNA libraries based on non-polyadenylated RNAs, and isolated its single gene, which evolved from a retroposed copy of a transfer RNA (tRNA^{Ala}). It was shown that BC1 RNA is the source gene for ID repetitive elements in rodents, and his laboratory established that the dendritic localization of BC1 RNA in neurons co-localizes with numerous components of the translation machinery. Based on these findings, Brosius concluded as early as the eighties that:

1. Functional RNAs are not only fossils from a by-gone RNA world but can arise de novo in modern cells and contribute to the functionality of a cell or organism; many more RNAs are yet to be discovered.

2. Retroposition (conversion of RNA to DNA) is an ancient process, but has persisted throughout the evolution of most eukaryotes. This process has contributed to the mass of genomes of modern multicellular organisms, at the same time keeping genomes in flux and presenting raw material for the de novo evolution of genes.

3. Retroposition, not only segmental gene duplication, can also yield extra gene copies or smaller gene modules including regulatory elements for existing genes.

Together with Stephen J. Gould, Brosius took the concept of exaptation to the genomic level.

Encouraged by the stimulating findings surrounding BC1 RNA, in the mid-nineties he emphasized the significance of RNA coding genes in association with genome projects and embarked on generating more cDNA libraries based on non-protein coding RNAs from mice and various model organisms, ringing in the era of RNomics,

A number of small nucleolar RNAs prevalently expressed in the brain as well as imprinted (only expressed by one parental chromosome) were discovered in mice and men.

Several of these mapped to the human Prader-Willi Syndrome locus, a neurodevelopmental disorder. After the individual deletion of all protein coding gene candidates of this locus in mouse models by others, the Brosius laboratory deleted the cluster of Snord116 snoRNA genes and the corresponding non-protein coding exons of the host gene. They observed some of the same phenotypes as the human disorder, such as failure to thrive and short stature, but not obesity later in life or infertility. This was confirmed by an independent study.

Earlier, Brosius and coworkers demonstrated that mice lacking the BC1 RNA gene had deficiencies in exploratory behaviour in the laboratory and under semi-natural conditions.

In addition to other RNomics discoveries, they were the first to demonstrate that certain tandem repeats were processed into CRISPR RNA units in Archaea.

Brosius remains a long-time advocate for the significance and wealth of RNA molecules even in modern cells. Yet, he is skeptical of the drastic transformation in the perception of RNA within the scientific community. The idea of pervasive importance of RNA was formerly frequently rejected. Currently, the trend of thought is to raise any background transcript or any detectable snippet of a transcript after processing or decay to a functional status.

He observed analogous trends in the field of repetitive or transposed genomic elements (TEs) including retroposed elements. These elements were initially considered to be junk, littering genomes, and proposed by only a few to constitute raw material for fortuitous and only occasional exaptations, and to be responsible for the plasticity of genomes and the modular architecture of genes. The current tide is moving in the opposite direction. A plethora of functions have been assigned to TEs, one example being the bewildering spectrum of tasks allocated to the evolutionarily young primate-specific Alu elements. Such sweeping interpretations should be challenged.

Other research areas include:

- de novo evolution of genes and parts thereof
- the use of retroposon markers to establish phylogenetic relationships
- the origin and evolution of life
- evolutionary thought to address bioethical questions
- RNA as diagnostic markers for various diseases including cancer

== Publications ==
- Brosius J NCBI Publication list
