= Ambient optic array =

Structured arrangement of light with respect to a point of observation

The ambient optic array is the structured arrangement of light with respect to a point of observation. American psychologist James J. Gibson posited the existence of the ambient optic array as a central part of his ecological approach to optics. For Gibson, perception is a bottom-up process, whereby the agent accesses information about the environment directly from invariant structures in the ambient optic array, rather than recovering it by means of complex cognitive processes. More controversially, Gibson claimed that agents can also directly pick-up the various affordances of the environment, or opportunities for the observer to act in the environment, from the ambient optic array.

== The optic array as reflected angles of light ==
Gibson stressed that the environment is not composed of geometrical solids on a plane, as in a painting, but is instead best understood as objects nested within one another and organized hierarchically by size. The ambient optic array, therefore, is also organized hierarchically by size, though the components are the solid angles from the object to the point of observation. Large solid angles come from the facades of various objects and interspaces between objects in the environment. Smaller solid angles are nested within the larger angles, and detail the facets and finer properties of the object. As the observer explores the environment, her relation to these angles change, and accordingly the appearance of the environment changes. For example, objects appear to grow larger or smaller depending on whether the observer moves towards or away from the object. This is because the angle subtended by the object to the observer becomes bigger as the observer gets closer, and smaller as the observer recedes. However the objective size of the actual object in the environment never changes. Put simply by philosopher Alva Noë, the ambient optic array is "how things look from here in these conditions."

== Invariants and direct perception ==
Gibson was interested in the structures of the ambient optic array that are invariant, or structures that remain static regardless of the actions of the observer. For example, Gibson noted that the upper hemisphere of the array (the sky) tends to be much less structured and brighter than the lower hemisphere (the cluttered earth). No matter what the observer does, the light will always be structured in this way. He also noticed that "optical flow patterns", or optical flow invariants, are produced in the array as the agent moves about the environment. The above example of objects "growing" or "shrinking" as an observer moves towards or away from them is an example of an optical flow invariant, as the array will always transform like this under those conditions. Gibson hypothesized that agents evolved to directly access relevant information about themselves and the environment from the invariant structures in the array, without the need for high level cognitive computations. In other words, in the aforementioned case of objects appearing to grow or shrink, no cognitive processes mediate the observer sensing the apparent growth in size of the object and the observer perceiving that she has now moved toward the object (or the object has moved toward her).

These invariant properties are linked with Gibson's idea of affordances. According to Gibson, an affordance is a property of the environment, much like color and size are. For an animal with the appropriate physiological equipment, a tree affords the ability to climb up it, or the ground the ability to walk upon it. Therefore, he claimed, affordances are also specified in the ambient optic array. This means that not only can an agent directly perceive that there is a horizontal surface or that a tree is a tree, but that a horizontal surface is "walk-on-able" or that a tree is "climb-up-able". In fact, the agent's perceptual system is so attuned to the invariant information, Gibson argues, that the agent need not consult any of its prior experiences in order to interact with the environment. This implies that agents pick-up meaning and value directly from the environment, rather than project it onto the world.

== Criticism ==
Many critics have rejected at least some of Gibson's claims. Psychologist Richard Gregory asserted that Gibson's bottom-up approach to perception is incomplete. He argued that visual illusions like the Necker cube are the result of the brain's indecision between two equally plausible hypotheses about the cube's orientation. The cube appears to "flip" between these two orientations even though the sensory information remains static. Therefore, Gregory reasoned that top-down processes must mediate perception. In response, Gibson argued that illusions like the Necker cube are the result of artifice and would not be encountered by agents in realistic perceptual situations, and therefore are irrelevant. However, the waterfall illusion is an example of a naturally occurring illusion and cannot be accounted for by Gibson's theory. Nevertheless, these two approaches can be reconciled. For example, Ulric Neisser developed the perceptual cycle, which involves top-down and bottom-up perceptual processes interacting and informing each other. The processes are causally linked, but of equal importance.

Furthermore, David Marr claimed that Gibson had profoundly underestimated the intricacy of visual information processing. While useful information may exist directly in the ambient optic array, Gibson does not elaborate on the mechanisms of the direct pick-up of this information. Marr argues that this is a complex information processing problem, and not as simple as Gibson makes it out to be.

== See also ==
- Affordance
- Ecological psychology
- J. A. Scott Kelso
- Optical flow
- Top-down and bottom-up design
