= Perceptual psychology =

Subfield of cognitive psychology

Perceptual psychology is a subfield of cognitive psychology that concerns the conscious and unconscious innate aspects of the human cognitive system: perception.

A pioneer of the field was James J. Gibson. One major study was that of affordances, i.e. the perceived utility of objects in, or features of, one's surroundings. According to Gibson, such features or objects were perceived as affordances and not as separate or distinct objects in themselves. This view was central to several other fields as software user interface and usability engineering, environmentalism in psychology, and ultimately to political economy where the perceptual view was used to explain the omission of key inputs or consequences of economic transactions, i.e. resources and wastes.

Gerard Egan and Robert Bolton explored areas of interpersonal interactions based on the premise that people act in accordance with their perception of a given situation. While behaviour is obvious, a person's thoughts and feelings are masked. This gives rise to the idea that the most common problems between people are based on the assumption that we can guess what the other person is feeling and thinking. They also offered methods, within this scope, for effective communications. This includes reflective listening, assertion skills, conflict resolution etc. Perceptual psychology is often used in therapy to help a patient better their problem-solving skills.

== Nativism vs. empiricism ==
Nativist and empiricist approaches to perceptual psychology have been researched and debated to find out which is the basis in the development of perception. Nativists believe humans are born with all the perceptual abilities needed. Nativism is the favoured theory on perception. Empiricists believe that humans are not born with perceptual abilities, but instead must learn them.

== See also ==
- Binding problem
- Psychophysics
- Physiological psychology
- Sociophysics
- Vision science
