= Temporary appropriation =

Realisation of an activity in a public space for which it was not designed

Temporary appropriation refers to the action in which a person or a group of people realises an activity in a public space for which it was not designed. According to Lara-Hernandez and Melis, it is process that implies dynamism similar to what Graumann called the humanisation of the space, which is the fundamental societal defined meanings interiorised by the individual. Representative activities of temporary appropriation can be grouped in three main categories: 1) sports, leisure and cultural activities. 2) activities related to economy such as work and services; and 3) activities related to sacralisation or worship. Authors stress two main factors that encourage the temporary appropriation phenomenon, on the one hand the cultural factor (also known as Synthetic psychological environment) while on the other the configuration or design of the built environment. The former refers to the group of symbols, values, attitudes, skills, knowledge, meanings, communication ways, social structure and physical objects that make possible the life of a determinate society. While the latter refers to human-made structures, features, and facilities viewed collectively as an environment in which people live and work. Temporary appropriation is an example of Architectural Exaptation in the urban environment.

== Theoretical explanation ==
The term appropriation was first introduced by Korosec-Serfaty in the Proceedings of the Strasbourg conference in 1976. Within the field of environmental psychology, the term appropriation is described as a temporary phenomenon that implies a dynamic process of interaction between the individual and their surroundings. It is a process similar to that of humanisation. Since then, several authors such as Purcell, Pol, and Yory with the theory of topophilia, have used the term to explain the theoretical link between people and places. These authors consider the appropriation as an inborn necessity of humans that can be expressed through activities that occur in the urban landscape. Public spaces are an essential part of the urban landscape and their design is therefore strongly linked to the possibility of occurring activities related to the Temporary Appropriation. In other words, while appropriation is a broader term, its temporary variation refers more specifically to public spaces. The accent in the latter has always been placed on the informality of this action (for more details see Temporary appropriation and urban informality: Exploring the subtle distinction). Dr. Lara-Hernandez conceptualises temporary appropriation instead as a consequence of the necessity of adapting human needs to a city that deprives the population of reference points due to sudden and unexpected changes. Additionally, it has been claimed that temporary appropriation plays a key role in enhancing urban resilience (see Temporary Appropriation in Cities: Human Spatialisation in Public Spaces and Community Resilience).
