= Exaptation =

Function of trait, shifted by evolution

Exaptation or co-option is a shift in the function of a trait during evolution. For example, a trait can evolve because it served one particular function, but subsequently it may come to serve another. Exaptations are common both in anatomy and in behaviour.

Bird feathers provide a classic example. Initially they may have evolved for temperature regulation, but later became adapted for flight. When feathers were first used to aid in flight, that was an exaptive use. Under natural selection they subsequently evolved to improve flight, so in their current state they are best regarded as adaptations for flight. So it is with many structures that initially took on a function as an exaptation: once molded for a new function, they become further adapted for that function.

Interest in exaptation relates both to the process and to the products of evolution: the process that creates complex traits and the products (functions, anatomical structures, biochemicals, etc.) that may be imperfectly developed. The term "exaptation" was proposed by Stephen Jay Gould and Elisabeth Vrba as a replacement for "pre-adaptation", which they regarded as a teleologically loaded term (i.e., it misleadingly implies that adaptation, or evolution generally, acts in pursuit of some goal).

== History and definitions ==
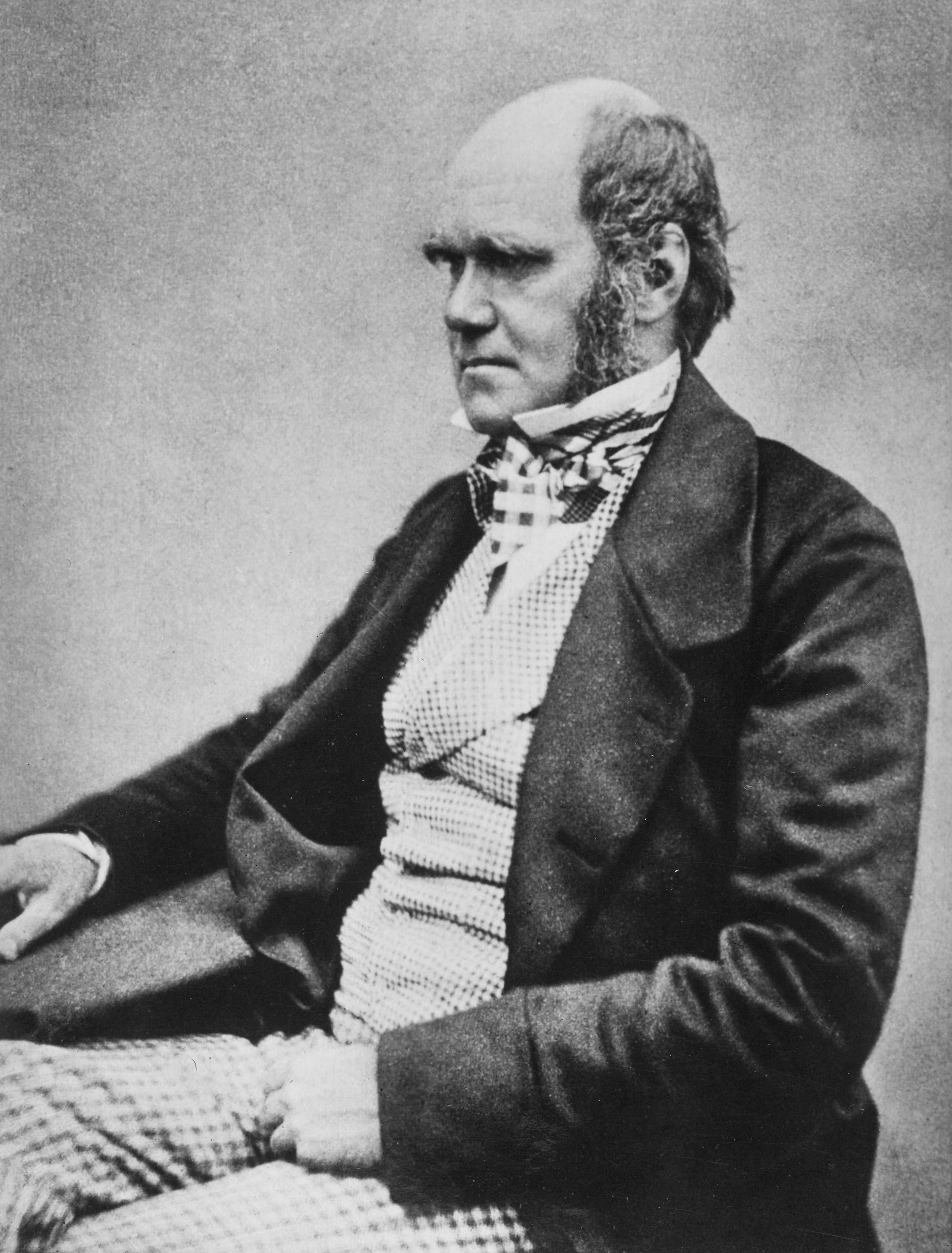
Charles Darwin

The idea that the function of a trait might shift during its evolutionary history originated with Charles Darwin (Darwin 1859). For many years the phenomenon was labeled "preadaptation", but since this term suggests teleology in biology, appearing to conflict with natural selection, it has been replaced by the term "exaptation".

The idea had been explored by several scholars (Note: See Jacob (1977) and Mayr (1982) for references.) when in 1982 Stephen Jay Gould and Elisabeth Vrba introduced the term "exaptation". However, this definition had two categories with different implications for the role of adaptation.

(1) A character, previously shaped by natural selection for a particular function (an adaptation), is coopted for a new use—cooptation. (2) A character whose origin cannot be ascribed to the direct action of natural selection (a nonaptation), is coopted for a current use—cooptation. (Gould and Vrba 1982, Table 1)

The definitions are silent as to whether exaptations had been shaped by natural selection after cooption, although Gould and Vrba cite examples (e.g., feathers) of traits shaped after cooption. Note that the selection pressure upon a trait is likely to change if it is (especially, primarily or solely) used for a new purpose, potentially initiating a different evolutionary trajectory.

To avoid these ambiguities, David Buss et al. suggested the term "co-opted adaptation", which is limited to traits that evolved after cooption. However, the commonly used terms of "exaptation" and "cooption" are ambiguous in this regard.

== Preadaptation ==
In some circumstances, the "pre-" in preadaptation can be interpreted as applying, for non-teleological reasons, prior to the adaptation itself, creating a meaning for the term that is distinct from exaptation. For example, future environments (say, hotter or drier ones), may resemble those already encountered by a population at one of its current spatial or temporal margins. This is not actual foresight, but rather the luck of having adapted to a climate which later becomes more prominent. Cryptic genetic variation may have the most strongly deleterious mutations purged from it, leaving an increased chance of useful adaptations, but this represents selection acting on current genomes with consequences for the future, rather than foresight.

Function may not always come before form: developed structures could change or alter the primary functions they were intended for due to some structural or historical cause.

== Examples ==
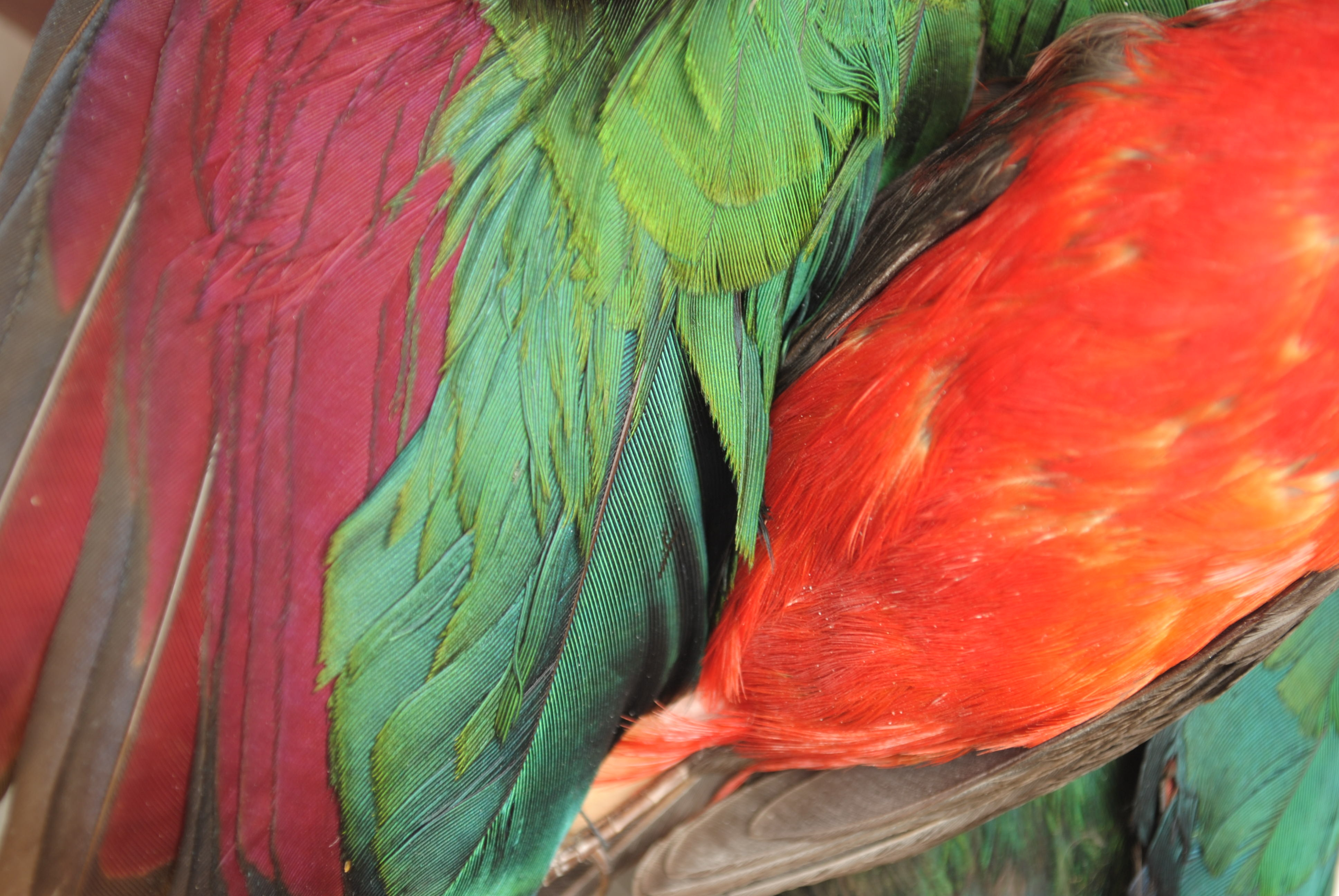
Bird feathers of various colors

Exaptations include the co-option of feathers, which initially evolved for heat regulation, for display, and later for use in bird flight. Another example is the lungs of many basal fish, which evolved into the lungs of terrestrial vertebrates but also underwent exaptation to become the gas bladder, a buoyancy control organ, in derived fish. A third is the repurposing of two of the three bones in the amniote jaw to become the malleus and incus of the mammalian ear, leaving the mammalian jaw with just one hinge.

Arthropods provide the earliest identifiable fossils of land animals, from about 419 million years ago in the Late Silurian, and terrestrial tracks from about 450 million years ago appear to have been made by arthropods. Arthropods were well pre-adapted to colonize land, because their existing jointed exoskeletons provided support against gravity and mechanical components that could interact to provide levers, columns and other means of locomotion that did not depend on submergence in water.

Metabolism can be considered an important part of exaptation. As one of the oldest biological systems and being central to life on the Earth, studies have shown that metabolism may be able to use exaptation in order to increase fitness, given some new set of conditions or environment. Studies have shown that up to 44 carbon sources are viable for metabolism to successfully take place and that any one adaptation in these specific metabolic systems is due to multiple exaptations. Taking this perspective, exaptations are important in the origination of adaptations in general. A recent example comes from Richard Lenski's E. coli long-term evolution experiment, in which aerobic growth on citrate arose in one of twelve populations after 31,000 generations of evolution. Genomic analysis by Blount and colleagues showed that this novel trait was due to a gene duplication that caused a citrate transporter that is normally expressed only under anoxic conditions to be expressed under oxic conditions, thus exapting it for aerobic use.

Gould and Brosius took the concept of exaptation to the genetic level. It is possible to look at a retroposon, originally thought to be simply junk DNA, and deduce that it may have gained a new function to be termed as an exaptation. Given an emergency situation in the past, a species may have co-opted junk DNA for a useful purpose. This may have occurred with mammalian ancestors when confronted with the Permian–Triassic extinction event about 250 million years ago and a substantial increase in the level of oxygen in Earth's atmosphere. More than 100 loci have been found to be conserved only among mammalian genomes and are thought to have essential roles in the generation of features such as the placenta, diaphragm, mammary glands, neocortex, and auditory ossicles. It is believed that as a result of exaptation, or making previously "useless" DNA into DNA that could be used in order to increase survival chance, mammals were able to generate new brain structures as well as behavior to better survive the mass extinction and adapt to new environments. Similarly, viruses and their components have been repeatedly exapted for host functions. The functions of exapted viruses typically involve either defense from other viruses or cellular competitors or transfer of nucleic acids between cells, or storage functions. Koonin and Krupovic suggested that virus exaptation can reach different depths, from recruitment of a fully functional virus to exploitation of defective, partially degraded viruses, to utilization of individual virus proteins.

== Adaptation and exaptation cycle ==
It was speculated by Gould and Vrba in one of the first papers written about exaptation, that when an exaptation arises, it may not be perfectly suited for its new role and may therefore evolve new adaptations to promote its use in a better manner. In other words, the beginning of evolving a particular trait starts out with a primary adaptation toward a fit or specific role, followed by a primary exaptation (a new role is derived using the existing feature but may not be perfect for it), which in turn leads to the evolution of a secondary adaptation (the feature is improved by natural selection for better performance), promoting further evolution of an exaptation, and so forth.

Once again, feathers are an important example, in that they may have first been adapted for thermoregulation and with time became useful for catching insects, and therefore served as a new feature for another benefit. For instance, large contour feathers with specific arrangements arose as an adaptation for catching insects more successfully, which eventually led to flight, since the larger feathers served better for that purpose.

== Implications ==
=== Evolution of complex traits ===
One of the challenges to Darwin's theory of evolution was explaining how complex structures could evolve gradually, given that their incipient forms may have been inadequate to serve any function. As George Jackson Mivart (a critic of Darwin) pointed out, 5 percent of a bird wing would not be functional. The incipient form of complex traits would not have survived long enough to evolve to a useful form.

As Darwin elaborated in the last edition of The Origin of Species, many complex traits evolved from earlier traits that had served different functions. By trapping air, primitive wings would have enabled birds to efficiently regulate their temperature, in part, by lifting up their feathers when too warm. Individual animals with more of this functionality would more successfully survive and reproduce, resulting in the proliferation and intensification of the trait.

Eventually, feathers became sufficiently large to enable some individuals to glide. These individuals would in turn more successfully survive and reproduce, resulting in the spread of this trait because it served a second and still more beneficial function: that of locomotion. Hence, the evolution of bird wings can be explained by a shifting in function from the regulation of temperature to flight.

=== Jury-rigged design ===
Darwin explained how the traits of living organisms are well-designed for their environment, but he also recognized that many traits are imperfectly designed. They appear to have been made from available material, that is, jury-rigged. (Note: Jacob (1977) sees much of evolution as "tinkering," that is, working with available traits. "Tinkering" includes (but is not limited to) shifts in function.) Understanding exaptations may suggest hypotheses regarding subtleties in the adaptation. For instance, that feathers evolved initially for thermal regulation may help to explain some of their features unrelated to flight. However, this is readily explained by the fact that they serve a dual purpose.

Some of the chemical pathways for physical pain and pain from social exclusion overlap. The physical pain system may have been co-opted to motivate social animals to respond to threats to their inclusion in the group.

=== Evolution of technology ===
Exaptation has received increasing attention in innovation and management studies inspired by evolutionary dynamics, where it has been proposed as a mechanism that drives the serendipitous expansion of technologies and products in new domains.

=== In resilience and regional studies ===
In resilience and regional studies, exaptation has been used to describe the capacity of complex social, economic and territorial systems to repurpose existing resources, traits or capabilities for new functions in response to external shocks. Dávid Kollár and József Kollár introduced the term exaptive resilience in their 2020 article The Art of Shipwrecking: The Information Society and the Rise of Exaptive Resilience, contrasting it with adaptive resilience as a response based on the refunctionalization of existing capacities rather than the preservation of predefined functions. The concept has also been applied in territorial research, including the ESPON project TERRA RES – Territorial Exaptive Resilience along EU Eastern Borders, which examined how border regions mobilize and repurpose existing assets and capabilities in response to crises and structural change.

=== In the cognitive science of religion ===
In the cognitive science of religion, exaptation is used to explain religious behavior and belief. As such, religion is seen as the byproduct of mental evolution.

== See also ==
- Architectural exaptation – Practice of repurposing architectural elements
- Atavism – Reappearance of a genetic trait once thought extinct
- Ecological fitting – Biological process
- Evolutionary anachronism – Attributes of living species that arose due to coevolution with other now-extinct species
- Neofunctionalization – Genetic process
- Repurposing – Using object intended for one purpose in alternative way
- Spandrel (biology) – Evolutionary byproduct of some other characteristic
- Vestigiality – Evolutionary retention of no longer needed structures in living organisms

== Sources ==
- Darwin, Charles (1859). "On the origin and transitions of organic beings with peculiar habits and structure". On the Origin of Species (1st ed.). London: John Murray. pp. 179–186.
- Darwin, Charles (1872). "Difficulties of the theory". The Origin of Species (6th ed.). London: John Murray. pp. 138–143.
- Ehrlich, Paul, and Marcus Feldman (2003) "Genes and Culture: What Creates Our Behavioral Phenome?," Current Anthropology, 44 (February):87–107. Included are comments and a reply.
- Gould, Stephen Jay; Vrba, Elisabeth S. (1982). "Exaptation — a missing term in the science of form" (PDF). Paleobiology. 8 (1): 4–15. Bibcode:1982Pbio....8....4G. doi:10.1017/S0094837300004310. JSTOR 2400563. S2CID 86436132.
- Gould, Stephen Jay (1991). "Exaptation: A Crucial Tool for an Evolutionary Psychology". Journal of Social Issues. 47 (3): 43–65. doi:10.1111/j.1540-4560.1991.tb01822.x.
- "Preadaptation" Merriam-Webster Online Dictionary. 2009. Merriam-Webster Online. 22 January 2009 <http://www.merriam-webster.com/dictionary/preadaptation>
