= Architectural exaptation =

Practice of repurposing architectural elements

Architectural exaptation is a concept in architecture and urban design that involves repurposing buildings, structures, or architectural elements for new uses that differ significantly from their original intended purpose. This practice extends beyond mere adaptation, as it involves a transformative process where the original functions are replaced or augmented by entirely new ones. It is a concept that embraces flexibility, creativity, and innovation in the use of architectural spaces and structures.

The term "exaptation," originally coined by paleontologists Stephen J. Gould and Elisabeth Vrba, is borrowed from evolutionary biology. It describes how certain features, evolved for a specific function, can be repurposed or co-opted for a different function. In architectural terms, this can be seen when buildings or their parts, designed for a specific purpose, find new life serving a completely different need. This phenomenon is manifested through two primary mechanisms: functional shift and functional co-optation (referred to as exaptation by Telmo Pievani).

Architectural exaptation is an interdisciplinary concept that connects the fields of architecture and archaeology. Architectural exaptation challenges traditional views in design and architecture that emphasize a deterministic approach where form strictly follows function. Instead, it highlights the adaptability and potential for innovation in existing structures. This concept is especially relevant in contemporary discussions about sustainability, as it promotes the reuse and creative repurposing of existing architectural resources.

Examples of architectural exaptation can range from the conversion of industrial buildings into cultural or residential spaces, to the creative reuse of minor architectural elements within a larger structure. Iconic examples include the Tate Modern in London, which transformed from a power station into a modern art gallery, the High Line in New York City, an elevated railway turned into an urban park, Ponte Vecchio in Florence, Plaza de Toros de las Arenas in Barcelona, and temporary appropriations of public spaces exemplify this adaptability.

Architectural exaptation is not just about physical transformation; it also encompasses a philosophical shift in how we perceive the built environment. It advocates for a more fluid, imaginative approach to design, where the potential for a building or space is not limited to its original function. This concept encourages architects, urban planners, and designers to think beyond conventional boundaries and explore the multifaceted potential of the built environment.
